= List of Intangible Cultural Heritage elements in Bolivia =

Location of Bolivia

The United Nations Educational, Scientific and Cultural Organization (UNESCO) defines intangible cultural heritage elements as non-physical traditions and practices performed by a people. As part of a country's cultural heritage, they include celebrations, festivals, performances, oral traditions, music, and the making of handicrafts. The term intangible cultural heritage is formally established by the Convention for the Safeguarding of the Intangible Cultural Heritage, which was drafted in 2003 and took effect in 2006. The inscription of new heritage elements on UNESCO's Intangible Cultural Heritage Lists for protection and safeguarding is determined by the Intergovernmental Committee for the Safeguarding of Intangible Cultural Heritage, an organization established by the convention. Bolivia ratified the convention on 28 February 2006. It served on the Intangible Cultural Heritage Committee from 2006 to 2008.

National lists are required by the convention for the further nomination of elements to the UNESCO lists.

== Intangible Cultural Heritage of Humanity ==
UNESCO's Intangible Cultural Heritage of Humanity consists of three lists: the Representative List of the Intangible Cultural Heritage of Humanity, the List of Intangible Cultural Heritage in Need of Urgent Safeguarding, and the Register of Good Safeguarding Practices. Bolivia has elements inscribed on the Representative List and Register of Good Safeguarding.

† Transnational element

=== Representative List ===
This list aims to represent the intangible cultural heritage of Bolivia worldwide and bring awareness to its significance.

Intangible Cultural Heritage elements recognized by UNESCO
Name	Media	Year	No.	Description
Andean cosmovision of the Kallawaya		2008	02299	
Carnival of Oruro	Diablada dance at an Oruro Carnival: people dressed in brightly coloured cothing are dancing.	2008	00003	
Ichapekene Piesta, the biggest festival of San Ignacio de Moxos	People who have feather headgear, Machatero dancers	2012	00627	
Pujllay and Ayarichi, music and dances of the Yampara culture	Two people attending a Pujilay dance, dressed in brightly colored and embroidered clothing.	2014	00630	
Ritual journeys in La Paz during Alasita	Miniature figures at a booth for Alasita	2017	01182	
The festival of the Santísima Trinidad del Señor Jesús del Gran Poder in the city of La Paz	A congregation at Iglesia del Señor Jesús del Gran Poder: a statue of Jesus dressed in an adorned, yellow robe is surrounded by people, and a woman in a blue dress is dancing.	2019	01389	
Grand Festival of Tarija		2021	01477	
Ch'utillos, the Festival of San Bartolomé and San Ignacio de Loyola, the meeting of cultures in Potosí		2023	01958	
Festivity of the Virgen of Guadalupe - Patroness of Sucre	A painting of the Virgen of Guadalupe praying.	2025	02306	

=== Register of Good Safeguarding Practices ===
This list accredits programs and projects that safeguard intangible cultural heritage and express the principles of the convention.

Good Safeguarding Practices recognized by UNESCO
Name	Media	Year	No.	Description
Safeguarding intangible cultural heritage of Aymara communities in Bolivia, Chile and Peru † (Note: Shared with Chile and Peru)	A mostly white Aymara poncho, or outer garment, with red stripes	2009	00299	

== See also ==
- List of World Heritage Sites in Bolivia
- Culture of Bolivia
- Tourism in Bolivia
