= Trinidad Municipality, Beni =

Trinidad Municipality
- Municipality
- Location within Bolivia
- Coordinates: 14.880144°S 65.7674808°W
- Country: Bolivia
- Department: Beni
- Province: Cercado
- Capital: Trinidad

Area
  - Total: 1,773 km^{2} (685 sq mi)

Population (2024)
  - Total: 124,357
  - Density: 70.14/km^{2} (181.7/sq mi)
- Time zone: UTC-4 (BOT)

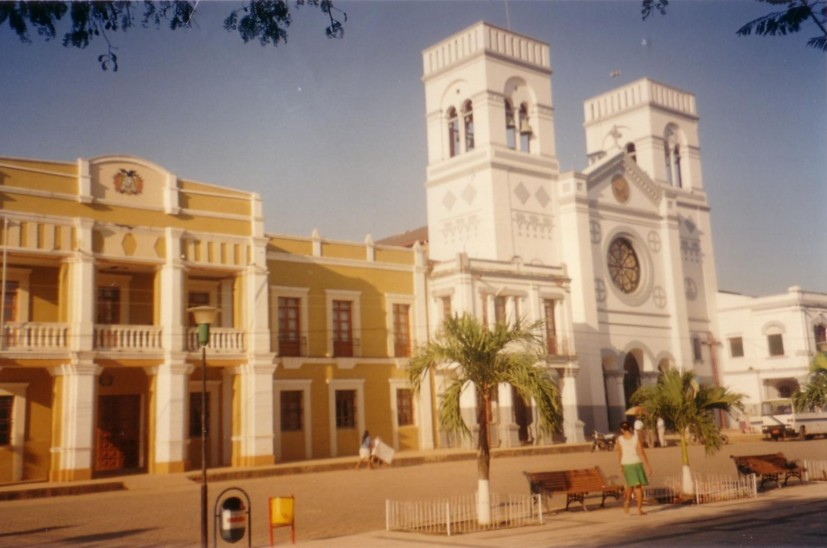

Trinidad Municipality is located in Beni Department in Bolivia.

== Location ==
Trinidad Municipio is the southernmost of two municipios in Cercado Province. It borders San Javier Municipality in the North, Moxos Province in the West, and Marbán Province in the South and Southeast.

Trinidad (75,540 inhabitants (2001 census)) is the province capital and is located in the western part of the municipio.

== Population ==
In the recent two decades, the municipio population has increased from 60,953 inhabitants (1992 census) to 79,963 (2001 census) and an estimated 85,500 inhabitants (2008).

The population density of the municipio is 45.1 inhabitants/km^{2}, the urban population rate is 94.5%. (2001)

Life expectancy at birth is 66.4 years. (2001)

The literacy rate of the population older than 19 years is 94.8%, 97.0% with the male and 92.7% with the female population. (2001)

== Cantons and Subcantons ==
The municipio covers an area of 1,773 km^{2} and contains only one canton (Cantón), Trinidad Canton. This is subdivided into ten subcantons (Sub-Cantones):

- Trinidad - 76,217 inhabitants (2001)
- Loma Suarez - 817 inhabitants
- Puerto Balivian - 194 inhabitants
- Puerto Barador - 632 inhabitants
- Villa Mayor Pedro Vaca Díez - 329 inhabitants
- Casarabe - 894 inhabitants
- El Cerrito - 190 inhabitants
- Ibiato - 404 inhabitants
- San Juan de Agua Dulce - 220 inhabitants
- San Javier (Monte Azul - Estancia San Nicolas) - 66 inhabitants
