= Erwin Rivero =

Bolivian politician (born 1957)

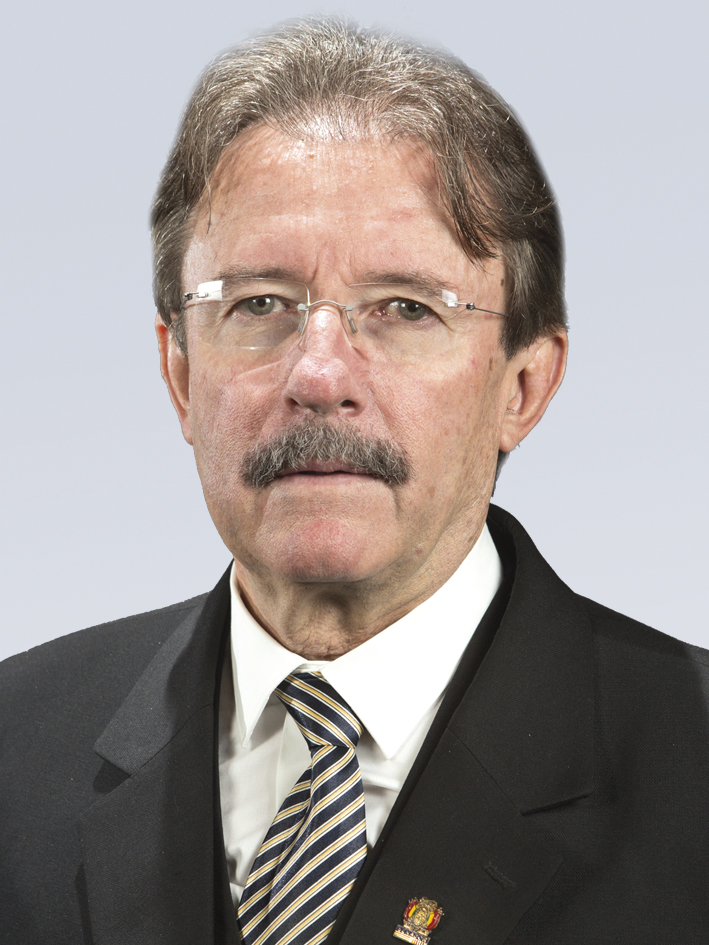
- Official portrait, 2018

Senator for Beni
- In office 18 January 2015 – 3 November 2020
- Substitute: Katya Chávez; Ruth Franco
- Preceded by: Freddy Bersatti
- Succeeded by: Suka Nacif

Prefect of Beni
- In office 24 October 2003 – 8 June 2004
- Appointed by: Carlos Mesa
- Preceded by: Fernando Romero
- Succeeded by: Fernando Ávila

Personal details
- Born: Erwin Rivero Ziegler; 16 September 1957 (age 69) Trinidad, Bolivia
- Party: Community Autonomy (from 2005)
- Other political affiliations: Revolutionary Nationalist Movement (until 2003)
- Education: Autonomous Metropolitan University — Xochimilco
- Occupation: Biochemist; pharmacist; politician

Erwin Rivero Ziegler (born 16 September 1957) is a Bolivian biochemist, pharmacist, and politician who served as senator for Beni from 2015 to 2020. Rivero spent most of his professional career working in the pharmaceutical industry, only entering politics at the turn of the twenty-first century. He joined the Revolutionary Nationalist Movement, holding minor posts at the provincial and departmental levels. With the collapse of the Gonzalo Sánchez de Lozada administration in October 2003, Rivero distanced himself from the government party and was appointed prefect of Beni by Carlos Mesa. He remained in office for half a year before being ousted for his role in the military's violent dispersal of protesters near Puente San Pablo. Undeterred, Rivero formed his own party, Community Autonomy, with which he competed for the Trinidad mayoralty, attaining third place, losing the contest but attaining a seat in the city's municipal council. The following year, he campaigned to return to the prefecture, finishing third. Despite his conservative political origins, Rivero aligned himself with the ruling Movement for Socialism, with which he unsuccessfully contested the Trinidad mayoralty before finally being elected as a senator for the party.

== Early life and political career ==
Erwin Rivero was born on 16 September 1957 in Trinidad, Beni. He completed his secondary schooling at the American Institute in Cochabamba before traveling to Mexico to attend the Metropolitan Autonomous University in Xochimilco, where he graduated as a clinical biochemist. Returning to Bolivia, Rivero spent most of his professional career working in the pharmaceutical industry. During this time, he served as secretary of the National School of Biochemistry and Pharmacy and was president of the Association of Agroforestry Producers of Beni.

Rivero first entered the political field as a member of the Revolutionary Nationalist Movement (MNR), a party with a long-standing dominant presence in the Beni Department since the country's transition to democracy. Rivero held minor posts at the provincial level, being appointed to serve as departmental counselor for the Marbán Province, representing one of its municipalities in the prefecture. In 2002, he was nominated to contest a seat in the Chamber of Deputies, accompanying Manuel Suárez Ávila as his substitute. The pair sought to represent Beni's circumscription 61, encompassing the department's capital province. Though Gonzalo Sánchez de Lozada handily won the district in the accompanying presidential election, Suárez and Rivero were left in second place, owing to the personal popularity of rival candidate Ernesto Suárez, the then-prefect. Despite the loss, Rivero continued to work in local government, serving as spokesman for Fernando Romero, Sánchez de Lozada's appointed prefect.

== Prefect of Beni ==
The collapse of the Sánchez de Lozada administration in October 2003 fractured the MNR, debilitating its presence as a national political force; many of its figures distanced themselves from the party, and although some returned, others did not. The latter was the case for Rivero, who, following the resignation of Romero amid the ongoing turmoil, was elevated to the position of prefect by Carlos Mesa, Sánchez de Lozada's successor. In contrast to his predecessor, Mesa's government sought to promote figures with academic and civil society backgrounds without strong partisan ties. Though Rivero largely met those qualifications, he stood out among the nine newly-designated prefects for his more overt links to the MNR. That acronym—near-toxic in those days—caused immediate discontent among social sectors, forcing Rivero to publicly resign his party membership within days of taking office. Nonetheless, he remained mistrusted among many sectors of Beni society, resulting in ongoing conflicts with the department's trade unions and indigenous rights groups for the duration of his term.

Discontent with Rivero's administration reached its peak in mid-2004 when the Departmental Workers' Center (COD) issued a resolution calling for his immediate dismissal. The deadline for this ultimatum expired on 1 June, leading organized labor and indigenous groups to institute a blockade along the highway near Puente San Pablo, connecting Trinidad to Santa Cruz de la Sierra. In response, Rivero deployed the Armed Forces and National Police to disperse the protest. The ensuing conflict between law enforcement and protesters made its way from the highway into the town, leaving dozens wounded as soldiers and police shot bursts of automatic weapons and raided homes. The "San Pablo affair", which ended in three deaths and multiple injuries, "overwhelmed the patience of the government", culminating in Rivero's removal less than a week later. In his presidential memoir, Mesa shifted blame away from the former prefect, lamenting that "the sad episode in San Carlos [sic] unjustly ousted Erwin Rivero, who had done a good job until then".

Rivero's deposition was not universally approved of among the department's inhabitants. Following his removal, supportive social sectors, including the Federation of Neighborhood Councils and the Local University Federation, mobilized to reject the prefect's dismissal, installing pickets outside the prefecture and holding vigils in and around Trinidad's mains square. Many of Rivero's supporters deflected blame for the violence in San Pablo onto Moisés Shriqui, the mayor of Trinidad, whom they accused of orchestrating the incident to discredit the prefect's administration. Rivero, for his part, decried his ouster as a "great injustice" against his person. In the ensuing months, he quickly shifted from governing to campaigning, forming the Community Autonomy (AVE) civic group to contest the Trinidad mayoralty later that year. Ultimately, however, Rivero failed to dislodge Shriqui from the mayor's office, though his party's fourteen percent margin was high enough to net him a seat in the Trinidad Municipal Council. The following year, Rivero sought to return to the prefecture, campaigning to become Beni's first democratically-elected prefect. He attained eighteen percent of the popular vote, finishing third at the polls.

== Later political career ==
In the ensuing years, Rivero initiated a progressive rapprochement with left-wing social sectors, aligning himself with the ruling Movement for Socialism (MAS-IPSP). Rivero's apparent turn in ideological inclination reflected the MAS's pragmatic strategy in the lowland departments, where its support was weakest. In these regions, the party turned to figures who had not historically belonged to the organization, who held experience in fronts the MAS otherwise harshly criticized, and who came from sectors even opposed to its socialist agenda. Rivero campaigned for the MAS in the 2009 general elections, for which he sought to become the party's gubernatorial candidate the following year, (Note: The post of prefect was replaced by that of governor by the 2009 Constitution.) arguing that his support had made inroads for the government among Beni's middle class. He was among three finalist pre-candidates for the MAS's nomination, together with Carlos Navia—another former prefect—and Jessica Jordan, former Miss Bolivia 2006. In a surprise move, President Evo Morales personally selected Jordan as his party's candidate, sidelining Rivero, whose political past "weighed heavily" on the final decision. Though excluded from the gubernatorial race, Rivero was given a second opportunity to compete when César Arteaga, the MAS's Trinidad mayoral candidate, was disqualified from running. In a capital resistant to the MAS, where conservative forces retained popularity, Rivero failed in his second attempt at dislodging Shriqui from the mayoralty, attaining second place. Nonetheless, he remained affiliated with the MAS, and in 2014, he was elected on the party's list as a senator for the Beni Department.

== Electoral history ==
Electoral history of Erwin Rivero
Year	Office	Party	Alliance	Votes			Result	Ref.
Year	Office	Party	Alliance	Total	%	P.	Result	Ref.
2002	Sub. Deputy	Revolutionary Nationalist Movement	MNR-MBL	9,940	30.59%	2nd	Lost	
2004	Mayor (Note: Per Article 3 Section VI of the 1967 Constitution with amendments from 1995, individuals who appear at the top of a party's electoral list of councillors are also that party's candidate for mayor.)	Community Autonomy	None	4,555	14.54%	3rd (Note: Presented on an electoral list. The data shown represents the share of the vote the entire party/alliance received in that constituency.)	Partial	
2005	Prefect	Community Autonomy	None	19,755	18.82%	3rd	Lost	
2010	Mayor	Community Autonomy	Movement for Socialism	11,763	24.49%	3rd	Lost	
2014	Senator	Community Autonomy	Movement for Socialism	74,084	41.49%	2nd	Won	
Source: Plurinational Electoral Organ | Electoral Atlas

Political offices
Preceded by Fernando Romero	Prefect of Beni; 2003–2004	Succeeded by Fernando Ávila
Senate of Bolivia
Preceded by Freddy Bersatti	Senator for Beni; 2015–2020; Served alongside: Yerko Núñez, Jeanine Áñez, María Argene Simoni, Bilgay Méndez, Pablo Gutiérrez, Eliseo Flores	Succeeded by Suka Nacif
Preceded by María Argene Simoni	Third Secretary of the Senate; 2018–2019	Succeeded by Eliana Mercier
