= Ichapekene Piesta =

Moxo festival in Bolivia

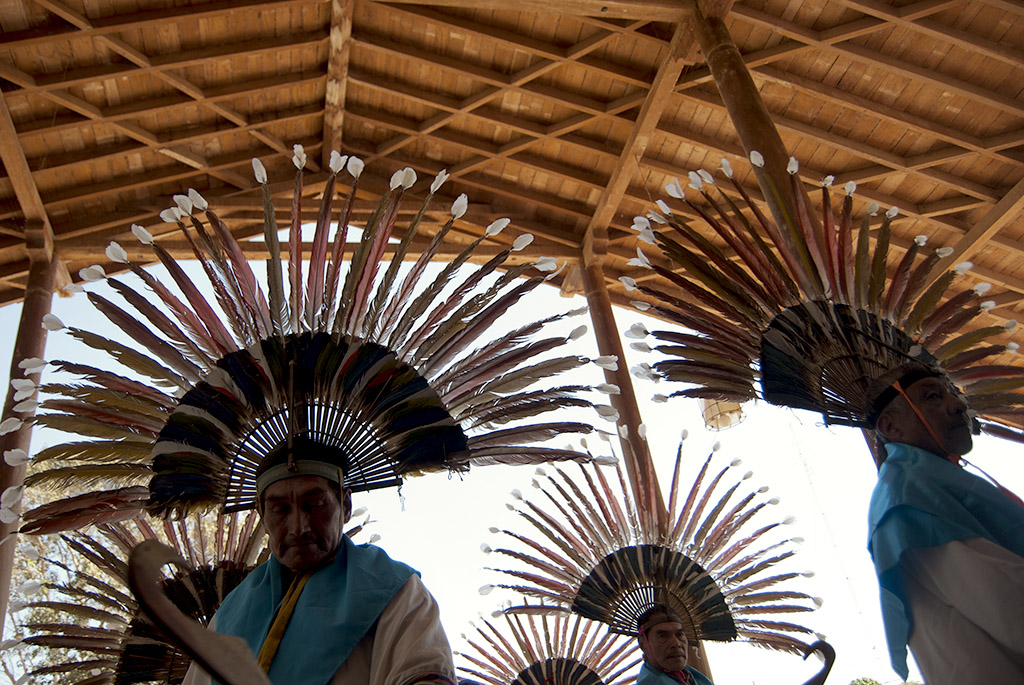
- Machatero dancers, a central part of the festival
- Genre: Festival
- Date: 30 July–2 August
- Frequency: Annual
- Locations: San Ignacio de Moxos, Bolivia

Ichapekene Piesta, the biggest festival of San Ignacio de Moxos
- UNESCO Intangible Cultural Heritage
- Country: Bolivia
- Reference: 00627
- Region: Latin America and the Caribbean

Inscription history
- Inscription: 2012 (7th session)
- List: Representative

Ichapekene Piesta is a festival annually celebrated in the town of San Ignacio de Moxos, Bolivia in homage to San Ignacio de Loyola, the patron saint of the city. It is known as the largest celebration of San Ignacio de Moxos and occurs between July 30 and August 2. On December 5, 2012, UNESCO added the festival to its list of Intangible Cultural Heritage of Humanity.

While the festival is only officially four days long, celebrations begin in May with fireworks and songs of worship and continue into July with daily & nightly festivals that include a variety of kinds of religious celebrations. The festival is syncretic, mixing elements of the indigenous Mojeño culture with the Jesuit evangelism of Catholicism through the missions of Moxos.

One of the most important events is the dance of the Machateros (or Chipiperono in the indigenous language), where men wearing wide headdresses adorned with feathers perform a dance with a wooden machete. It is believed that wearing the feathers invokes the soul of the bird, and therefore the sun, so the Machateros are often considered as sun warriors.

Some also see the feathers and solar imagery as a reference to Jesus's resurrection and ascent into the heavens. A central component of the dance and the festival itself is the evocation and respect for nature, which includes a procession of participants wearing animal masks and other costumes.

== See also ==
- Mojeños
- San Ignacio de Moxos
- Moxo languages
