= San Javier, Bolivia =

San Javier, Bolivia may refer to:

- San Javier, Ñuflo de Chávez, in Ñuflo de Chávez province, Santa Cruz department
- San Javier, Cercado, in Cercado province, Beni department
