= Trinitario language =

Arawakan language

Trinitario
- Trinitario-Javeriano-Loretano
- Native to: Bolivia
- Ethnicity: 30,000 Trinitario people (2012)
- Native speakers: 3,140 (2012)
- Language family: Arawakan: Southern; Bolivia–Parana; Moxo languages; Trinitario
- Dialects: Trinitario; Javierano; Loretano

Official status
- Official language in: Bolivia

Language codes
- ISO 639-3: trn
- Glottolog: trin1274
- ELP: Trinitario

Trinitario is an Arawakan language of the Moxo subgroup, spoken in Bolivia by the Trinitario people, where it is an official language.

== Official status ==
The 2009 Constitution of Bolivia established 37 languages, including Trinitario, as the official languages of Bolivia.

== Geographical distribution ==
Trinitario is spoken in the Isiboro Sécure National Park and Indigenous Territory, along the Mamoré River in the city of Trinidad and the villages of San Lorenzo de Moxos and San Francisco de Moxos.

== Classification ==
Trinitario is a variety of the Moxo languages, which is a subgroup of the Arawakan language family. Historical documentation of the Moxo language formed one of the cornerstones of the foundation of Arawakan, along with Maipure, formerly spoken in Venezuela.

== Phonology ==
=== Consonants ===
Consonants in Trinitario Mojeno
	Labial			Alveolar		Palatal	Velar		Glottal		
	plain	pal.	lab.	plain	pal.	Palatal	plain	pal.	plain	pal.	lab.
Stop	p	pʲ		t		c	k	kʲ	ʔ	ʔʲ	
Nasal	m	mʲ	mʷ	n		ɲ					
Fricative				s	sʲ	ç			h	hʲ	hʷ
Affricate				ts	tsʲ	tʃ					
Liquid				ɾ	ɾʲ						
Approximant	w	βʲ				j					

Voicing is not contrastive in Trinitario. 16 consonants simply articulated at six points of articulation and 12 consonants with secondary articulations, either palatalized or labialized, are distinguished.

/h/ is "often" voiced as [ɦ] between vowels. /w/ becomes [β] before a front vowel, and palatalized to [ɥ] when preceding /j/. Glottal stops may be realized with varying degrees of closure, ranging from full closure of the glottis to creaky voice. /ɾ/ may have a "schwa-like transitional vocoid" [ᵊ] immediately preceding it.

=== Vowels ===
Vowels in Trinitario Mojeno
	Front	Central	Back
High	i iː		u uː
Mid	e eː	ə͡e ə͡eː	o oː
Low		a aː	

In careful speech, the complex vowel /ə͡e/ is realized as [ə] followed by [e], but in rapid speech it may be pronounced as [ɘ, ɨ, ɛ~e]. Vowels immediately following nasals, as well as word- and sentence-final position, may be slightly nasalized.

== Sample text ==
The following is a translation of The North Wind and the Sun in Trinitario.

Trinitario	English
To tjooveko kjo o ene to sache	The North Wind and the Sun
To tjooveko kjo o ene to sache techjirikwonriꞌiji teꞌ to najpukeji ꞌtumeponriꞌiji, te tetavikpopriꞌi etna mapuiiriru tyaykukwopriꞌi te pjo ꞌchope muepkochepo.	People tell that the North Wind and the Sun were discussing who was stronger, while a traveller was passing by, wrapped up in a large cape.
Techokokompo teꞌ to najpukaeji natiwina naetpigieji to tvejamuiriokapo to muepkochepo, eto mrakineji to ꞌtumewooꞌi.	They agreed that the one would be the first to reach his taking off his cape would be might (in strength).
To tjooveko kjoꞌo mrakaeji to ... tochusraaꞌi tektikwopuiji to tajichriꞌi, etotsero to tochus ... tochukpooꞌi, taemiaykunecheji to muepkochepo ema mapuiiriru.	The North Wind got strong in his blowing, it blew on purpose, but as it was blowing, it made the traveler wrap himself even more in its cape.
Takeptse to tjooveko kjoꞌo trassakpuiji to tochusraaꞌi taenajikpooꞌi to taworiraaꞌi	In the end, the North Wind calmed its blowing, it abandonned its decision.
Takeptse to trappesrawo tamikuchra to sache, teꞌ to tajaaresrawo ꞌnuujinaeji to maveꞌriꞌi to muepkochepo ema mapuiiriru, tjicho eto tjooveko kjoꞌo, taechopo to mrakaeji to tatumewooꞌi to sache.	Then the shining, the lighting of the Sun. Immediately after this light started, the traveller took off his cape, for that reason the North Wind knew the strength of the power of the Sun.
Jeꞌe, titowopo pjoka ꞌchosioropi, rusrupaya.	All right, the old story is over, thank you.
