= Trinidad Municipality =

Trinidad Municipality may refer to:

- Trinidad Municipality, Beni, Bolivia
- Trinidad, Casanare, Colombia
