= Route 24 (Bolivia) =

Highway in Bolivia

Route 24
- Ruta 24

Route information
- Length: 260 km (160 mi)

Major junctions
- West end: Villa Tunari
- East end: San Ignacio de Moxos

Location
- Country: Bolivia

Highway system
- Highways of Bolivia; National Roads
← Route 23	→ Route 25

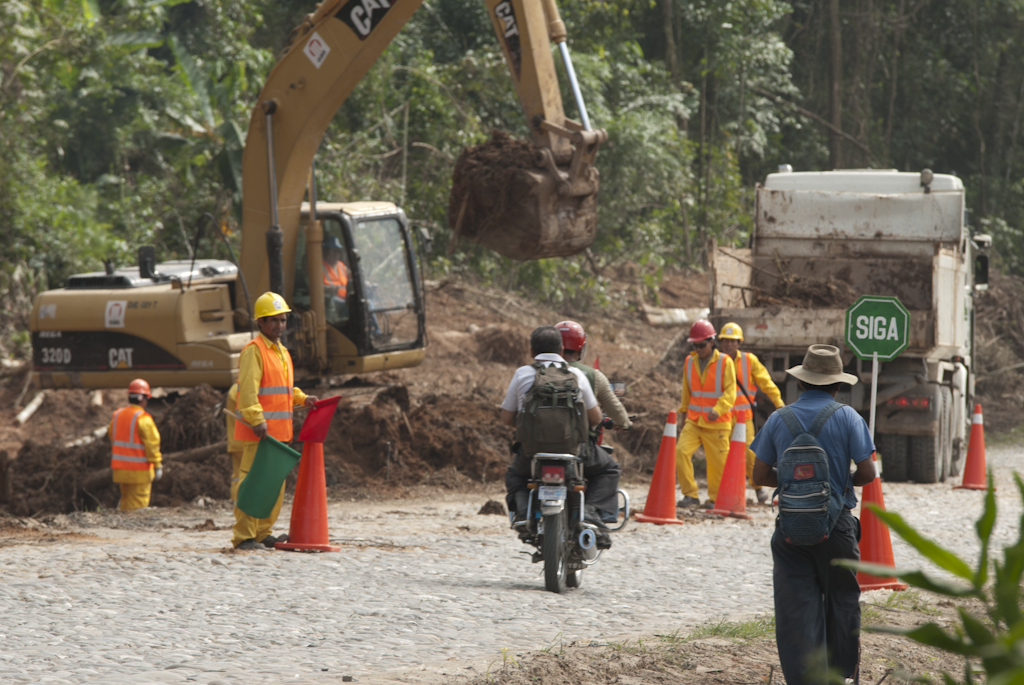
Construction of the highway, as observed by a UN-Página Siete team, July 2011

The Villa Tunari – San Ignacio de Moxos Highway, also known as the Cochabamba–Beni Highway, is a road project in Bolivia connecting the towns of Villa Tunari (in Cochabamba Department) and San Ignacio de Moxos (in Beni Department). It would provide the first direct highway link between the two departments. The project has an expected overall cost of $415 million and extends 306 kilometres (190 mi), divided into three segments: Segment I from Villa Tunari to Isinuta (47 km or 29 mi), Segment II from Isinuta to Monte Grande (177 km or 110 mi), and Segment III from Monte Grande to San Ignacio de Moxos (82 km or 51 mi). Opposition to the highway by local indigenous communities, environmentalists, as well as shifting relations between the Bolivian government and the project's builders and funders interrupted construction of Segment I from October 2011 until October 2013, indefinitely delayed Segment II, and postponed construction of Segment III until June 2015. Segment II will proceed after the government has promised to raise living standards in the area.

While the highway has been discussed for decades, a $332 million loan from Brazil's National Bank for Economic and Social Development (BNDES), approved by Bolivia in 2011, facilitated the start of construction. Under the terms of the loan, the Brazilian construction firm OAS was to build the road. In June 2011, President Evo Morales inaugurated the project with a ceremony at Villa Tunari. However, neither a final design nor environmental approval had been released for Segment II. Opposition from indigenous residents in the Isiboro Sécure National Park and Indigenous Territory (TIPNIS) and environmentalists led to a protracted public conflict about the highway, ending with the prohibition of highway passing through the park. President Morales has stated that the controversy over the highway has "instilled fear" in potential financial backers of other highway projects in the country.

The government has remained publicly committed to the project while revising its timeline. The segment of the road from Villa Tunari to Insinuta was built between 2013 and 2016; the northern segment from Monte Grande and San Ignacio de Moxos is under construction. While Segment II within TIPNIS remains prohibited, initial construction work on the highway there was carried out in 2017. An August 2017 law repealed special protections for the park and authorized the drafting of a transportation plan for TIPNIS.

== Proposals ==
Proposals for a highway linking the region of San Ignacio de Moxos with Cochabamba have been raised perennially in the history of the region.

Ignacio Flores, the Spanish governor of Mojos proposed opening a road from Cochabamba to Mojos via the Chapare in 1780. The purpose of the proposal was threefold: to encourage re-settlement of Cochabambinos in the region, where they could grow coca, sugar and other crops; to assist in the civilizing of the Yuracaré people, most of whom continued to resist missionary influence; and to bring Mojos into the economic orbit of Cochabamba, bypassing the control of Santa Cruz de la Sierra.

== Route and Segments ==
The proposed 306 kilometres (190 mi) route is divided into three segments, numbered from south to North. Segment I from Villa Tunari to Isinuta (47 km or 29 mi), Segment II from Isinuta to Santo Domingo (177 km or 110 mi), and Segment III from Santo Domingo to San Ignacio de Moxos (82 km or 51 mi). Current work on Segment III begins at Monte Grande, covering the northern 76 km of this segment.

Segment (Spanish: Tramo)	Length	Principal locations on route	Builders	Status
Segment I	47 km	Villa Tunari — Etarazama — Puerto Patiño (southern edge of TIPNIS) — Isinuta	Bolivian Enterprise for Construction (EBC), Association for Road Maintenance (AMVI). Formerly OAS.	Completed. Opened September 11, 2016.
Segment II	177 km	Isinuta — Puerta Esperanza (northern edge of TIPNIS) — Santo Domingo	Undetermined.	Partially built. Three bridges built between 2017 and 2018. Further progress stalled.
Segment III	82 km	Santo Domingo — Monte Grande — Puerto Germán Busch — Puente Loco — Puesto Laguna — San Ignacio de Moxos	Dirección de Ingeniería Social. Formerly Binational Bolivian-Venezuelan military brigade (Fuerza Binacional).	Under construction. Earthen platform 60-80% complete north of Monte Grande as of April 2017. Northern portion (San Ignacio de Moxos-Monte Grande) scheduled for October 2017 completion.

== Construction and contractors ==
OAS, a Brazilian infrastructure corporation, won the contract to build the highway in 2008. Bolivia and the Brazilian Development Bank (BNDES) signed Financial Collaboration Contract N° 10219991 on February 15, 2011, in which the bank extended a $332-million loan to support construction. OAS' work on the road lasted from June 2011 to April 2012, although Segment II was halted in October 2011. On April 10, 2012, President Morales announced the cancellation of the contract, citing delays in construction as well as other technical failures on the part of OAS. The Brazilian development bank, which had agreed to the loan financing the bulk of the project contingent on the use of OAS, immediately withdrew its funding and has stated that not one dollar of the loan was disbursed.

On October 6, 2012, a new contract assigned $32.5 million for the construction of the 47-km Segment I from Villa Tunari and Insinuta. The newly created state-owned Bolivian Enterprise for Construction (Spanish: Empresa Boliviana de Construcción, EBC) and the local, cocalero-owned Association for Road Maintenance (Asociación de Mantenimiento Vial; AMVI) were awarded the contract. They resumed construction on October 24, 2013, and are obligated to complete their work by September 9, 2015. As of December 2013, the firms reported 30% completion of their work on the segment. Segment I was finally completed in 2016, and was formally opened on September 11.

On June 27, 2015, a binational Bolivian-Venezuelan military unit began construction of Segment III from San Ignacio de Moxos to Santo Domingo. The government announced that $144 million would be invested in building this northern segment. On May 29, 2016, President Morales announced a $20 million government investment through the Agency for the Development of Macroregions and Frontier Zones (Agencia para el Desarrollo de las Macroregiones y Zonas Fronterizas; ADEMAF) to build the earthen platform and embankment of this road in the northern 76 kilometer stretch of this road, from Monte Grande to San Ignacio de Moxos. Construction passed to the Social Engineering Directorate (Dirección de Ingeniería Social) of ADEMAF. In April 2017, ADEMAF described the platform as 60 to 80% complete, "despite the rains and whirlwind which had wiped [it] out"; the project resumed in late May.

In July 2017, TIPNIS community members reported that construction is underway on two bridges for Segment II of the highway inside the park, and offered photographic evidence of it. The newspaper El Deber confirmed that construction is underway at a bridge 6.7 km north of Insinuta and that construction firms Sergut and Incotec are working on the project under a contract with the Bolivian Highway Administration. Incotec's executive president told the paper that the contract has a confidentiality clause. Minister of Public Works, Milton Claros, testified in September 2017 that these bridges are authorized by Supreme Decree 1146 (of February 24, 2012) and an Environment and Water Ministry resolution of February 4, 2014. (He had denied, the previous month, that there was any active highway project inside TIPNIS.) According to Minister Claros, the three bridges are:

Bridges within Segment II
Bridge over	Length	Scheduled Completion
Isiboro River	250m	October 13, 2018
Ibuelo River	120m	April 16, 2018
Sasama River	150m	June 15, 2018

In March 2018, Fernando Vargas, ex-president of the Subcentral TIPNIS, estimated that two of the bridges are about 60% complete. In August 2018, Los Tiempos reported their construction was completed.

In February 2019, the Bolivian Highways Administration announced that construction of the road itself was stalled and the project remained at "stage zero," but TIPNIS indigenous leaders said they doubted that report.

== Conflict concerning Isiboro-Sécure Indigenous Territory and National Park ==
In May 2010, the a meeting of TIPNIS Subcentral and corregidores throughout the territory stated their "overwhelming and unrenounceable opposition" to the project. In July 2011, following the beginning of construction the Subcentral TIPNIS (the representative institution of indigenous residents in the territory), the Confederation of Indigenous Peoples of Bolivia, and the highland indigenous confederation CONAMAQ announced they would participate in a national march opposing the project.

A major concern about the impact of the road is its contribution to deforestation: "Empirical evidence has shown that highways are motors for deforestation" concluded a study of the project by the Program for Strategic Investigation in Bolivia (PIEB). The study projected that the road would markedly accelerate deforestation in the park, leaving up to 64% of TIPNIS deforested by 2030. A technical report submitted by the Bolivian Highway Administration (ABC) established that the direct deforestation caused by the road itself would only be 0.03%; similarly, President Morales has spoken of a 180-hectare deforestation, an area equivalent to a rectangle 180 km long and 10 m wide. According to the last government survey 49 of 64 communities in TIPNIS are in favour of the construction of the road.

The Subcentral, the Confederation of Indigenous Peoples of Bolivia (CIDOB), and the highland indigenous confederation CONAMAQ carried out a national march from Trinidad, Beni to La Paz in opposition to the project, beginning on August 15, 2011. On September 25, a police raid on the march resulted in the detention of hundreds of marchers, who were later released. The march regrouped and arrived in La Paz on October 19 to a massive public welcome. During the march, other movements such as the Cochabamba campesino confederation and the colonos union in Yucumo mobilized in favor of the project. In early October, the Plurinational Legislative Assembly passed legislation authored by the MAS authorizing the road following a consultation process, but indigenous deputies and the indigenous movement opposed the bill. At the opening of negotiations with the protesters on October 21, Morales announced that he would veto the legislation and support the text proposed by the indigenous deputies. This text was passed by the Assembly and signed into law on October 24, effectively ending the conflict. Law 180 of 2011 declares TIPNIS an intangible zone and prohibits the construction of highways that cross it.

Beginning in December 2011, the Bolivian government rallied supporters of the highway, in Cochabamba, San Ignacio de Moxos, and the southernmost port of TIPNIS, in a campaign to reverse Law 180. Conisur, an organization of communities living in Polygon 7 at the south of TIPNIS, led its own pro-highway march from December 19 in the territory to January 2012 in La Paz. While Conisur demand that Law 180 simply be annulled, the government proposed instead to conduct a "prior consultation" of TIPNIS indigenous communities on the question of the highway as well as Law 180's declaration of the highway as an intangible zone. This proposal was passed as Law 222 on February 10, 2012. Non-CONISUR TIPNIS communities and their traditional leaders rejected the proposed consultation declaring that it "is not free, but rather is being imposed by force; is not informed, insofar as there is manipulation of information concerning the reach and effects of this law, which are hidden by the state ... and does not deal in good faith" The Subcentral TIPNIS and CIDOB organized a new 62-day march opposing the consultation which reached La Paz in June, but their demands were not attended to by the government.

The Plurinational Electoral Organ took on the task of carrying out the community consultation, visiting communities in the territory from July 29 through December 3, 2012. According to the official count, 58 communities of the 69 within TIPNIS participated and 55 of them supported the road, while 57 rejected the "intangibility" of the territory imposed by Law 180. However, a human rights observation mission led by the Permanent Assembly for Human Rights of Bolivia (APDHB), the Inter-American Federation for Human Rights (FIDH), and the Catholic Church from November 29 to December 14 reached a different conclusion. They found that "of the 36 communities visited by FIDH and APDHB, only 19 stated having been consulted, and 30 communities rejected construction of the road." The observers also described "numerous irregularities in the consultation process" and denounced that "the communities consulted reported having received gifts, having been pressured or being imposed restrictions in exchange for acceptance of the consultation; some were coerced through the suspension of development projects in case of refusal."

Coinciding the publication of the consultation's results in April 2013, three laws were envisioned to address the future of the territory and the road project: one annulling Law 180, a second instituting environmental safeguards, and a third preventing further occupation of the territory by coca growers. However, legislative leaders and Minister of Public Works Vladimir Sánchez announced that the government would prioritize eliminating extreme poverty in TIPNIS through the end of 2014, and defer any action on the highway project and the suggested laws. Alex Ferrier, the governor of Beni after the 2015 elections, has pledged to advance the project.

In May 2015, Conisur announced that it held a gathering of pro-road communities who called for Segment II to be built. Later that month, Emilio Noza of the Subcentral Isiboro Sécure-Tipnis and Fernando Vargas president of the Subcentral Tipnis declared that their member communities continue to oppose the road and stating that a Subcentral Tipnis representative had confirmed that no such gathering had been held, as claimed, in Santa Trinidad.

In 2017, the governing MAS party introduced legislation to repeal the intangibility protections of Law 180 and to authorize the drafting of a transportation plan. This law, the Law for the Protection, Integral and Sustainable Development of TIPNIS (Spanish: Ley de Protección, Desarrollo Integral y Sustentable del Territorio Indígena Parque Nacional Isiboro Sécure (TIPNIS)), was enacted as Law 266 on August 13, 2017.

In the 2021 regional election, Alejandro Unzueta, the winning candidate for governor of Beni department, proposed that any highway to Villa Tunari should run outside of TIPNIS. Meanwhile, deposed ex-president Evo Morales called for reactivating the project. In June 2022, under pressure from the San Ignacio de Moxos Civic Committee, Unzueta again raised the possibility of a highway, suggesting that it could be built in an ecological fashion without settlements or deforestation. Public works minister Edgar Montaño responded that building the highway would require prior consultation with affected indigenous communities.
