= Cercado Province (Beni) =

Coordinates: 14°30′S 64°30′W

Cercado
- Province
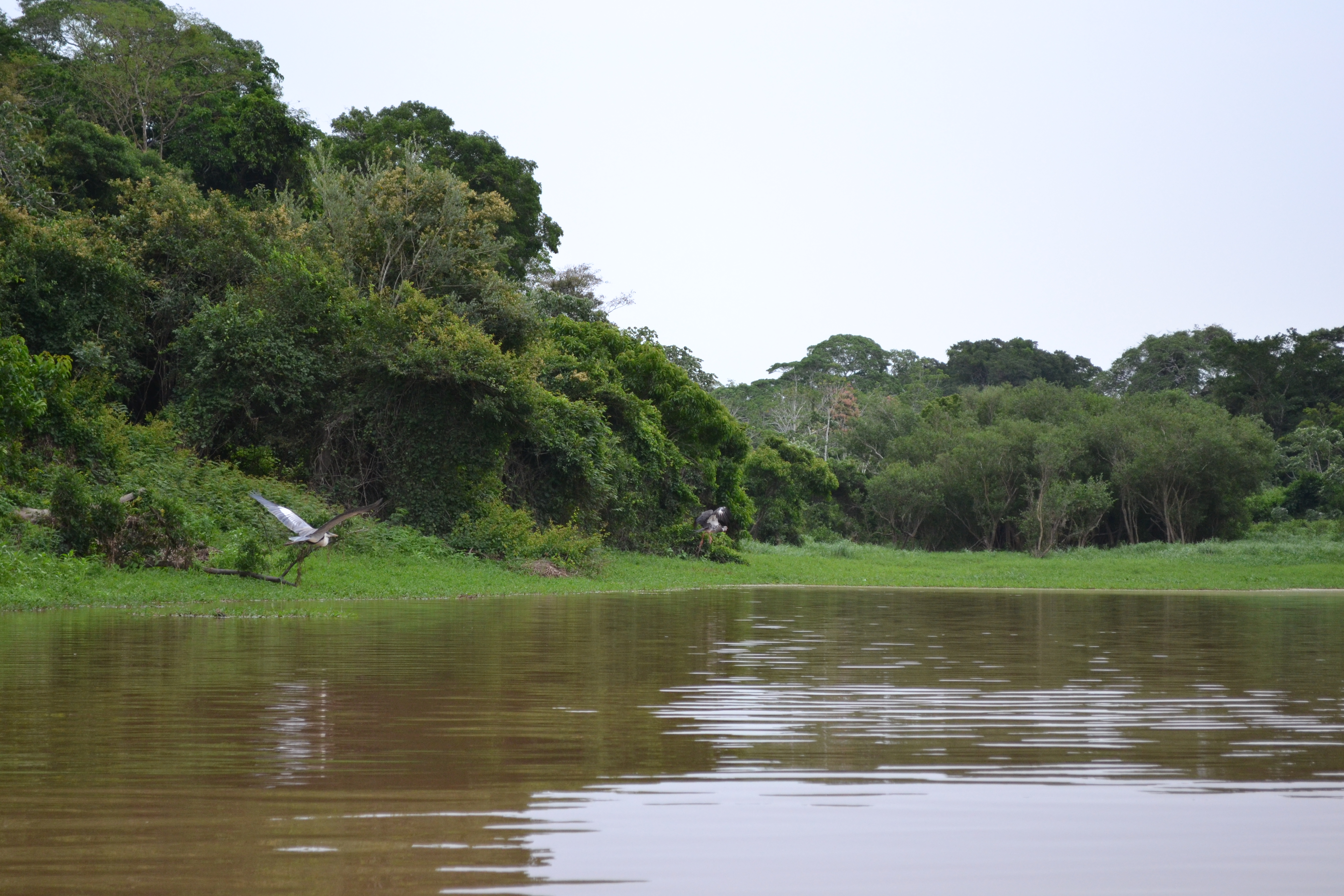
- View of a lagoon in the Chuchini Wildlife Reserve.

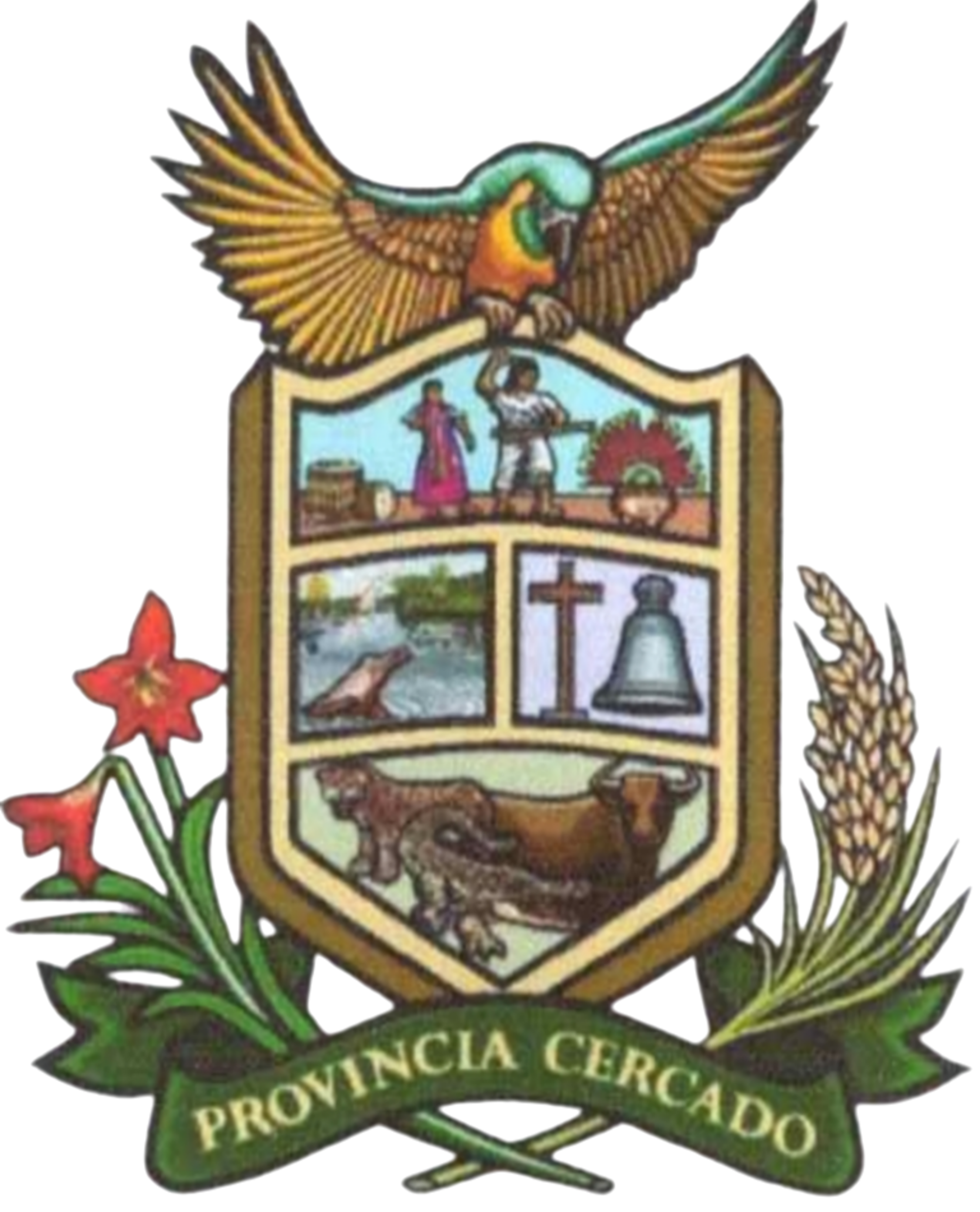
- Flag Coat of arms

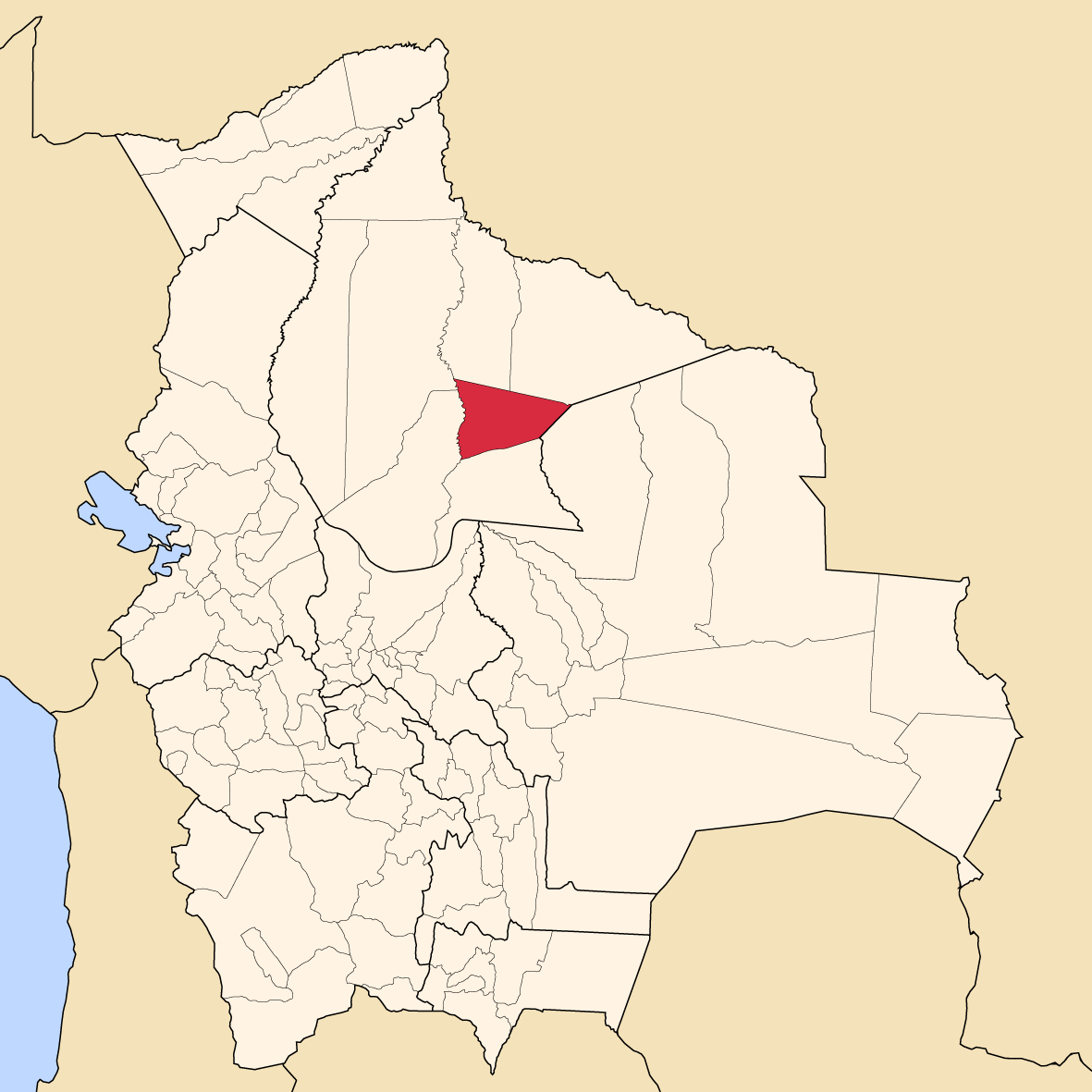
- Map of Bolivia highlighting the province of Cercado.

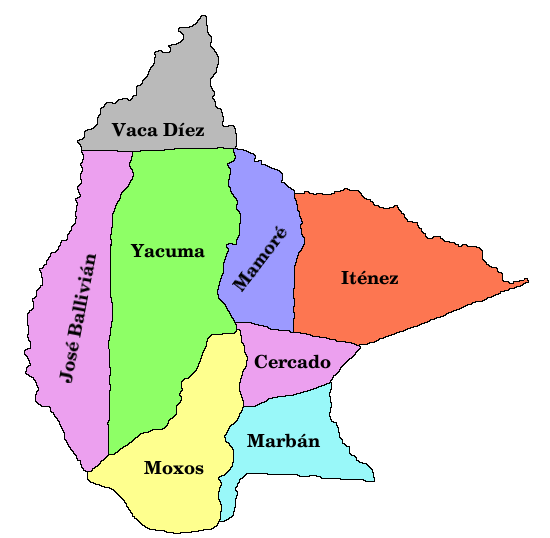
- Provinces of the Beni Department
- Country: Bolivia
- Department: Beni
- Settlements: Municipalities: San Javier; Trinidad

Area
  - Total: 4,740 sq mi (12,276 km^{2})

Population (2024 census)
  - Total: 132,011
  - Density: 27.852/sq mi (10.754/km^{2})
- Time zone: UTC-4 (BOT)

Cercado is a province located in northwestern Bolivia in Beni Department. It has an area of 12,276 km ² with a population estimated by the National Institute of Statistics of Bolivia for 2024 of 132,011 and a density of 7.67 people / km ². Its capital is the city of Trinidad.

== Subdivision ==
Cercado Province is divided into two municipalities which are partly further subdivided into cantons.

Section	Municipality	Inhabitants (2001)	Seat	Inhabitants (2001)
1st	Trinidad Municipality	79,963	Trinidad	75,540
2nd	San Javier Municipality	2,690	San Javier	199
