= Ignaciano language =

Arawakan language

Ignaciano
- Native to: Bolivia
- Ethnicity: 2,000 Ignaciano (2012)
- Native speakers: 1,080 (2012)
- Language family: Arawakan: Southern; Bolivia–Parana; Moxo languages; Ignaciano

Official status
- Official language in: Bolivia

Language codes
- ISO 639-3: ign
- Glottolog: igna1246
- ELP: Ignaciano

Ignaciano is an Arawakan language spoken in Bolivia by the Ignaciano people, where it is an official language.

== Phonology ==
=== Consonants ===
Consonants in Ignaciano Mojeno
	Labial	Alveolar	Palatal	Velar	Glottal
Nasal	m	n	ɲ		
Stop	p	t		k	ʔ
Affricate		ts	tʃ		
Fricative	β	s	ʃ	x	
Rhotic		r			
Approximant	w	l	j		

=== Vowels ===
Vowels in Ignaciano Mojeno
	Front	Central	Back
High	i		u
Mid	e		
Low		a	

- /e/ can also have an allophone of [ɛ].
