= Mojeños =

Coordinates: 15.6670°S 65.9170°W

Mojeño
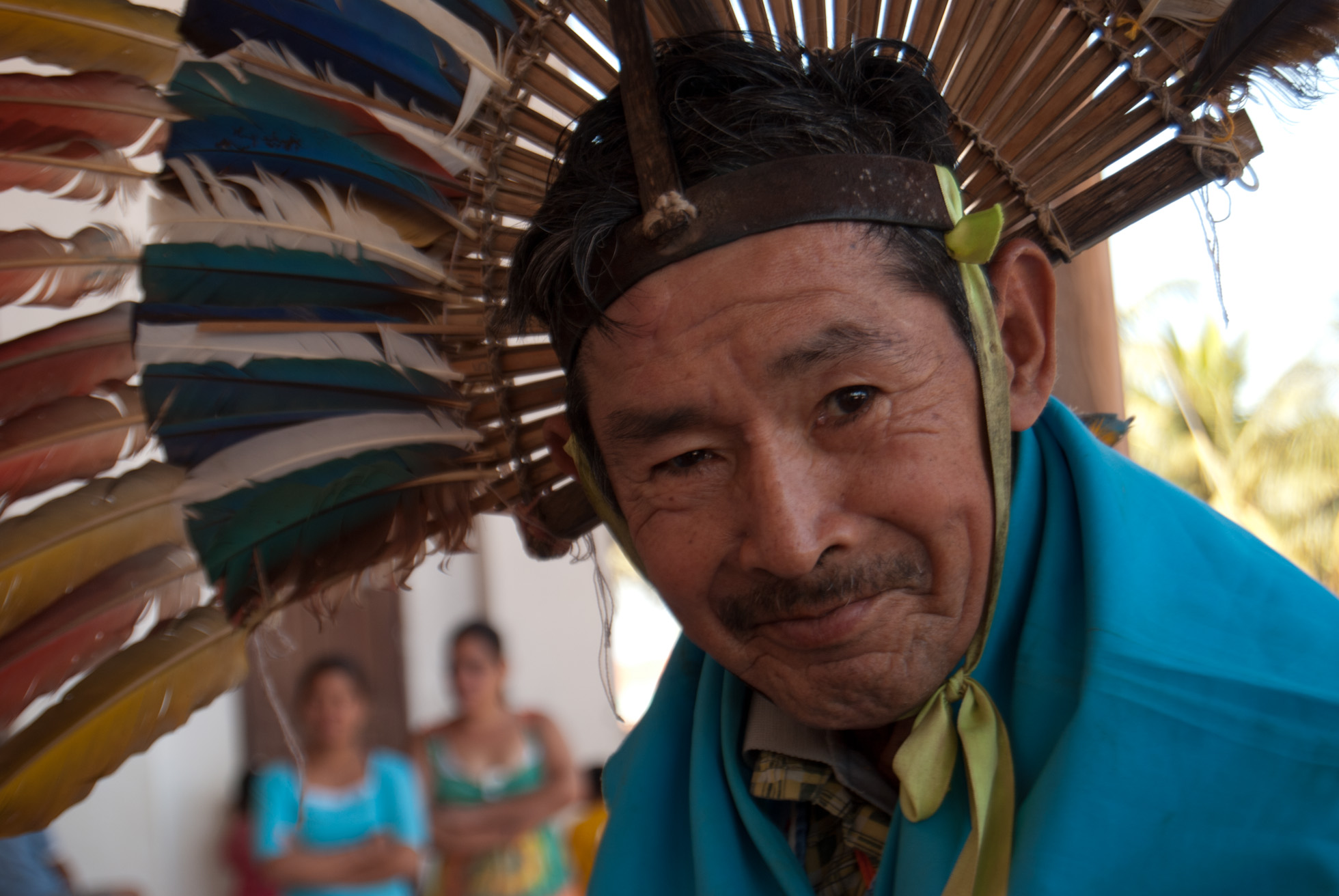

Total population
- 42,093 (2012)

Regions with significant populations
- Bolivia (Beni)

Languages
- Mojeño, Spanish

Religion
- Roman Catholicism

Related ethnic groups
- Trinitario

The Mojeños, also known as Moxeños, Moxos, or Mojos, are an indigenous people of Bolivia. They live in south central Beni Department, on both banks of the Mamore River, and on the marshy plains to its west, known as the Llanos de Mojos. The Mamore is a tributary to the Madeira River in northern Bolivia.

Mojeños were traditionally hunter-gatherers, as well as farmers and pastoralists. Jesuit missionaries established towns in the Mojos plains beginning in 1682, converting native peoples to Catholicism and establishing a system of social organization that would endure well beyond the expulsion of the Jesuits in 1767. Mojeño ethnic identification derives from a process of ethnogenesis as a result of this encounter between a number of pre-existing ethnic groups in this mission environment. This process occurred in several different mission towns, resulting in distinct Mojeño identities, including Mojeño-Trinitarios (Trinidad mission), Mojeño-Loretanos (Loreto mission), Mojeño-Javerianos, and Mojeño-Ignacianos (San Ignacio de Moxos mission). They numbered some 30,000 in the first decade of the 20th century. Many Mojeño communities are affiliated with the Central de Pueblos Indígenas del Beni and/or the Central de Pueblos Étnicos Mojeños del Beni.

== Name ==
They are also known as Mojos, Moxos or Moxeños.

== Language ==
In addition to Spanish, many Mojeño people speak one of the several indigenous languages, belonging to the Arawakan language family, including the Moxo languages. In many communities, the language is used in daily life and taught in beginning primary school grades. A dictionary of Ignaciano-Mojeño has been published, and the New Testament was translated into the language in 1980.

== History ==
=== Moxos before the Jesuits ===
The previous inhabitants of the region, which before the independence of Bolivia was a single territory called Mojos, were the aboriginal Itonama, Cayuvava, Canichana, Tacana and Movima. Afterwards, the Moxos or the Moxeños arrived. The Moxos were from the Arawak ethnic group, an ethnic group which developed a more complex culture between the Amazon rainforest and the Llanos.

For unknown reasons, between the 15th Century B.C. and the 8th Century B.C., agricultural Arawak groups from the lowlands (present-day Suriname) abandoned their lands and migrated to the west and south, bringing with them a tradition of incised ceramics. The Moxos, who were part of this population stream, built irrigation canals and crop terraces as well as ritual sites. Thousands of years before the Common Era, the Arawak also migrated north and populated the islands of the Caribbean Sea. This slow expansion resulted in their arrival at the islands of Cuba and Hispaniola (present-day island of the Dominican Republic and Haiti).

Pottery pieces found in the countryside of the department of Santa Cruz, Bolivia, and even in the present-day precinct of the city Santa Cruz de la Sierra, reveal that the region was populated by an Arawak tribe (known as the Chané) with a ceramic-making culture.

Writers such as Diego Felipe de Alcaya, tell of a group living between the last buttresses of the Andes Mountains and the central arm of the Guapay River. The communities all throughout this great plain region and along the banks of the river were established and allied under the superior command of a leader, whom Alcaya describes with the title of king. This king, called by the dynastic name of Grigotá, had a comfortable dwelling and wore a vividly-colored shirt. Chiefs (caciques), named as Goligoli, Tundi, and Vitupué, were subordinate to Grigotá and had control of hundreds of warriors.

As a result, the first Jesuits in Moxos encountered a developed, ancient civilization. Thousands and thousands of artificial hills up to 60 feet high dotted the landscape, along with hundreds of artificial rectangular ponds up to three feet deep, all part of a system of cultivation and irrigation. The people used the built-up high ground for farming and dug canals to unite ponds and rivers that caught water in this flood-prone region.

All these architectural and structural masterpieces can be attributed to the ancestors of the present-day Moxeños, who include the Arawak, the most extensive ethnic group in the area. The Moxos language belongs to a language family called Arawakan. The Arawak have always been famous architects, and indeed the great hydraulic works (dated to ca. 250 CE) of their ancient empire is located in the territory of Moxos.

Even today one speaks of the "Amazonian cultures" as a block, despite the differences between the various peoples. The Amazonian cosmos includes a tripartite world: the sky above, the earth here, and the underworld below. These cultures believe that the earth is controlled by a father creator, in collaboration with created spirits or dueños, masters, of places or things and with ancestors who help to maintain justice and balance. Slipping from the norm brings about a spiritual sickness that is cured by a communal search for the cause and by a variety of religious rituals, including prayers and natural remedies. In Moxos the principal dueños are the spirits of the jungle (connected with the tiger) and of the water (connected with the rainbow). Many rich dances renew the life of the community and the universe.

=== Jesuit mission era ===
Jesuit priests arriving from Santa Cruz de la Sierra began evangelizing native peoples of the region in the 1670s. They set up a series of missions near the Mamoré River for this purpose beginning with Loreto. The principal mission was established at Trinidad in 1686.

The Jesuit missionaries who first encountered the Moxeños found a people with a strong belief in God as father and creator. The Jesuits accepted in their catechism the names the indigenous peoples gave to God in their own languages, trying to embrace all aspects of the culture not contrary to Christian faith or custom.

== See also ==
- Moxos Province
