= List of World Heritage Sites in Bolivia =

World Heritage Sites in Bolivia, the Qhapaq Ñan sites are in blue.

The United Nations Educational, Scientific and Cultural Organization (UNESCO) World Heritage Sites are places of importance to cultural or natural heritage as described in the UNESCO World Heritage Convention, established in 1972. Cultural heritage consists of monuments (such as architectural works, monumental sculptures, or inscriptions), groups of buildings, and sites (including archaeological sites). Natural features (consisting of physical and biological formations), geological and physiographical formations (including habitats of threatened species of animals and plants), and natural sites which are important from the point of view of science, conservation or natural beauty are defined as natural heritage.

The Plurinational State of Bolivia accepted the convention on 4 October 1976, making its historical sites eligible for inclusion on the list. Bolivia has seven sites on the list and a further five on the tentative list. The first site listed in Bolivia was the city of Potosí, in 1987. Noel Kempff Mercado National Park is a natural site, the other six sites are listed for their cultural properties. One site is transnational: the Qhapaq Ñan, Andean Road System is shared with five other countries.

== World Heritage Sites ==
UNESCO lists sites under ten criteria; each entry must meet at least one of the criteria. Criteria i through vi are cultural, and vii through x are natural.

* Transnational site

World Heritage Sites
Site	Image	Location (department)	Year listed	UNESCO data	Description
City of Potosí	View of the city from above, with the prominent church towers	Potosí	1987	420; ii, iv, vi (cultural)	Located at an altitude of 4,000 m (13,000 ft) in the Andes, the small pre-Hispanic hamlet of Potosí was developed into a major industrial complex by the Spanish colonists after 1572. The silver deposits of Cerro Rico were mined by forced labour by the native population under the mit'a system. In addition to the mining infrastructure, numerous buildings and monuments have been preserved. An important architectural style featured is called Andean Baroque, which represents a fusion of European and Andean influences.
Jesuit Missions of the Chiquitos	A church with a large roof and an adjacent bell tower on decorated wooden pillars	Santa Cruz	1990	529; iv, v (cultural)	In the 17th and 18th centuries, the Jesuits founded several missions to convert local tribes to Christianity. These missions survived the expulsion of Jesuits from South America in 1767, although several have disappeared since. Six missions are listed as the World Heritage Site. The common features are large churches with double-sloping roofs. They are mostly wooden constructions, except for the San José de Chiquitos which is made of stone. The art in the churches blends Christian and local traditions. The church in Concepción is pictured.
Historic City of Sucre	View of the city from above with many tiled roofs and a church tower	Chuquisaca	1991	566; v (cultural)	Sucre was founded by the Spanish in 1538 and declared the first capital of Bolivia in 1839. The buildings constructed between the 16th and 19th centuries demonstrate the mixture of European styles, brought from Spain, and local traditions. Important buildings include the Metropolitan Cathedral of Sucre, several churches, and the House of Freedom, which played an important role in the fight for independence.
Fuerte de Samaipata	Building ruins and a hill with stone carvings behind	Santa Cruz	1998	883; ii, iii (cultural)	The archaeological site comprises the remains of an Incan and pre-Incan town and a large monolithic sandstone formation above the settlement with numerous stone carvings. The first traces of human presence date to around the year 300. The carvings, depicting animals and geometric shapes, were interpreted to have ceremonial and ritual significance. In the 14th century, the area was occupied by the Inca, who made it a provincial centre. After the Spanish conquest, it became an important staging post on the route to the mines in Potosí.
Tiwanaku: Spiritual and Political Centre of the Tiwanaku Culture	A monolith depicting a human figure	La Paz	2000	567rev; iii, iv (cultural)	Tiwanaku was the capital of the eponymous empire that flourished in the southern Andes between 400 and 900, until it collapsed in the first half of the 12th century. Monuments that remain from the city include the terraced platform mounds Akapana and Pumapunku, the Kalasasaya temple, and the Gate of the Sun. The people of Tiwanaku were highly skilled in working with stone. They also introduced agricultural innovations, such as artificial terraces, to the region.
Noel Kempff Mercado National Park	A waterfall in a tropical setting	Santa Cruz	2000	967; ix, x (natural)	The national park in the Amazon basin comprises various types of habitats, including tropical rainforests, gallery forests, savannahs, swamps, semi-deciduous dry forests. The cerrado habitats on the Huanchaca plateau have been isolated for millions of years, which provides insight into the evolution of the ecosystems. The park is home to 600 bird species and thousands of plant species.
Qhapaq Ñan, Andean Road System*	Paved path in the mountains	La Paz	2014	1459; ii, iii, iv, vi (cultural)	Qhapaq Ñan is an extensive pre-Incan and Incan road system, spanning over 30,000 km (19,000 mi) across the Andes. The roads connect high mountain peaks with rainforests, coasts, valleys, and deserts. The road system formed the lifeline of the Inca Empire, allowing transport and exchange of goods, as well as movements of messengers, travelers, and even armies. The site comprises 273 components featuring structures such as roads, bridges, ditches, and supporting infrastructure, three of which are in Bolivia. The site is shared with Argentina (a section pictured), Chile, Colombia, Ecuador, and Peru.

== Tentative list ==
In addition to sites inscribed on the World Heritage List, member states can maintain a list of tentative sites that they may consider for nomination. Nominations for the World Heritage List are only accepted if the site was previously listed on the tentative list. Bolivia has five properties on its tentative list.

Tentative sites
Site	Image	Location (department)	Year listed	UNESCO criteria	Description
Sajama National Park	A snow-covered mountain peak, river in front	Oruro	2003	(mixed)	The area was first protected in 1939 because of the forests of Polylepis tomentella that grow at high altitudes. The region is inhabited mainly by the Aymara people, who preserve their traditional lifestyle, based on herding and yarn spinning, as the land is not appropriate for agriculture due to harsh climate. Other features of the national park include hot springs, caves with paintings, and pre-Columbian burial buildings.
Pulacayo, Industrial Heritage Site	A historic black and white photo depicting miners in front of a mine entrance	Potosí	2003	iii, iv, vi (cultural)	Pulacayo developed around Huanchaca, the second largest silver mine in the world, which was operational in the second half of the 19th century. It was owned by Aniceto Arce, a silver mining tycoon and the 22nd President of Bolivia. The wealth from the mine brought development to the country, including the first railroads and the introduction of steam engines to the mining process. Although the mining has not ceased, the infrastructure and the landscape are well preserved. A historical picture from 1880 is shown.
Incallajta, the largest Inca site in the Kollasuyo	Inca ruins partially covered by vegetation	Cochabamba	2003	ii, iii, iv, v (cultural)	The fortified city of Incallajta was one of the main Inca sites in Bolivia. It was built in the second half of the 15th century by Topa Inca Yupanqui. Today, this is an archaeological site with preserved remains of around 40 stone buildings, fortifications, and Kalanka, a large structure that measured 70 m (230 ft) in length.
Cal Orck'o: Footprints of time	People inspecting dinosaur footprints on a steep wall	Chuquisaca	2003	viii (natural)	The dinosaur footprints at Cal Orck'o date to the late Cretaceous period, 68 million years ago. They were preserved because they were covered by ash following a volcanic eruption, which protected them from erosion.
Sacred Titicaca Lake	A man in traditional clothes and reed boats at the lake shore	La Paz	2003	(mixed)	Lake Titicaca is a large freshwater lake on the border of Bolivia and Peru at an altitude of 3,810 m (12,500 ft). It is fed by several rivers from the mountains. The shores of the lake have been inhabited for millennia and there are numerous archaeological sites in the area from civilizations including the Inca and Tiwanaku. There are also buildings from the colonial era. The lake is also listed on the tentative list in Peru.

== See also ==
- List of Intangible Cultural Heritage elements in Bolivia
