= Asunta Limpias de Parada =

Bolivian musician

- Born: April 11, 1915; Trinidad, Beni Department, Bolivia
- Died: October 27, 1995 (aged 80); Cochabamba, Bolivia
- Occupations: Composer, writer, singer, pianist

Asunta Limpias de Parada (April 11, 1915 in Trinidad – October 27, 1995 in Cochabamba) was a Bolivian composer, writer, singer and pianist who contributed a wide and diverse body of content in folk music.

== Biography ==
Limpias de Parada was born in Trinidad, the capital of the Beni Department in 1915. She was the daughter of writer and journalist Manuel Limpias Saucedo, founder of the newspaper El Echo del Beni, published in Trinidad. She began performing with groups such as "Los Carlos" and "Los Trinitarios", and in Cochabamba she formed the ensembles "Los Benianas" and "Las Chaskatikas". She began to act in television in Buenos Aires with much success.

Limpias de Parada produced a diversity of music. Some of her best known songs include "Quiero estar en Cochabamba", "Canita al aire", 'No estas en mi", "La vida y el Mamore", the polka "Escúchame", "No nací para casado", "Callaron las guitarras", "La Pascana", "Vera Cruz", "Canción para encontrarme", "Pobre lunita" and "Como una cintita". She often performed with her sister Mary and her daughter Ana María, and recorded songs with Gladys Moreno and Nora Zapata.

Limpias de Parada served as President of the Bolivian Institute of Art (IBART). She was also noted for her charity work, and was a benefactor of the Alberta Reyes d'Avis children's hospital in Trinidad and organized charity evenings in Cochabamba to raise money for the Albina Patiño Hospital.

== Musical works ==
- Quiero estar en Cochabamba
- Canita al aire (taquirari)
- No estas en mi (taquirari)
- La vida y el Mamoré (taquirari)
- Escúchame (polka)
- No nací para casado
- Callaron las guitarras
- La Pascana
- Vera Cruz
- Canción para encontrarme
- Pobre lunita
- Como una cintita
- Escobita (cueca)
- Gaviota sin mar (cueca)
- Amancaya
