= Rolando Ribera =

Bolivian footballer (born 1983)

Personal information
- Full name: Rolando Ribera Menacho
- Date of birth: March 13, 1983 (age 43)
- Place of birth: Trinidad, Bolivia
- Height: 1.74 m (5 ft 9 in)
- Position: Midfielder

Senior career*
Years	Team	Apps	(Gls)
2002–2008	San José	211	(6)
2009	Universitario Sucre	29	(1)
2010–2011	San José	36	(0)
2012–2015	Universitario Sucre	78	(1)
2015–2016	Sport Boys	21	(0)
2017	Nacional Potosí	10	(0)

International career
2008–2010	Bolivia	2	(0)
- * Club domestic league appearances and goals as of 3 May 2018

Rolando Ribera Menacho (born March 13, 1983, in Trinidad) is a Bolivian football midfielder. He currently plays for Nacional Potosí.

== Club title ==
Season	Club	Title
2007 (C)	San José	Liga de Fútbol Profesional Boliviano
2014 (C)	Universitario de Sucre	Liga de Fútbol Profesional Boliviano
