= Puente San Pablo =

Coordinates: 15.2442°S 63.8667°W

- Town
- Interactive map of Puente San Pablo
- Country: Bolivia
- Time zone: UTC-4 (BOT)

Puente San Pablo is a small community in Bolivia’s Beni Department. It as a population of 2341 (2012).
