= San Ignacio de Moxos =

- Town and municipality
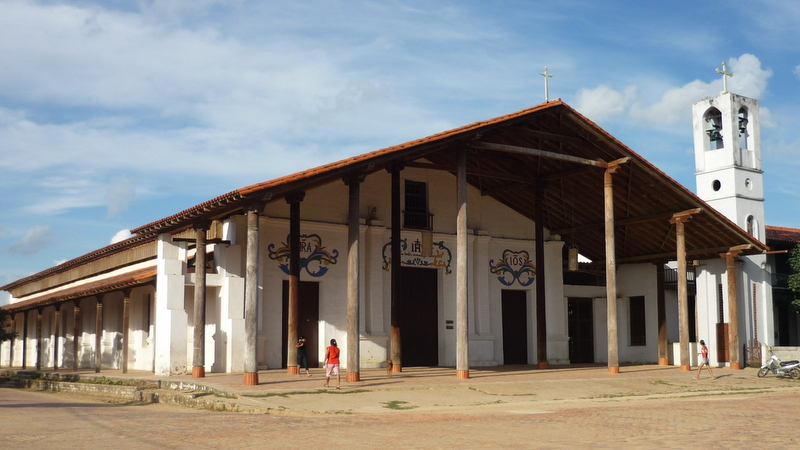
- San Ignacio de Moxos Mission Church

- Location of San Ignacio in Bolivia
- Coordinates: 14°59′46″S 65°38′24″W
- Country: Bolivia
- Department: Beni Department
- Province: Moxos Province
- Elevation: 472 ft (144 m)

Population (2012 Census)
  - Total: 10,054
- Time zone: UTC-4 (BOT)

San Ignacio de Moxos (or simply San Ignacio) is a town in the Beni Department of northern Bolivia.

== History ==
San Ignacio de Moxos was founded in 1689 by the Jesuit missionaries Antonio de Orellana, Juan de Espejo and Alvaro de Mendoza. Its first location was 20 miles south of the current location of San Ignacio.

== Geography ==
San Ignacio is the capital of the Moxos Province and is situated at an elevation of 144 m above sea level at Laguna Isiboro, a lake of 20 km^{2} west of the town. San Ignacio is located 100 km south-west of Trinidad, the department's capital.

San Ignacio de Moxos is located in the wettest region of the Beni department, situated on the border between the Amazon rainforests of the Chapare region, and the monsoonal llanos of western Santa Cruz and southwestern Beni. While San Ignacio de Moxos experiences a short dry season, rain is plentiful year round, and temperatures are generally warm to hot. The area has a tropical monsoon climate according to the Köppen Classification System, bordering on a tropical rainforest climate.

=== Climate ===
Climate data for San Ignacio de Moxos, elevation 160 m (520 ft)
Month	Jan	Feb	Mar	Apr	May	Jun	Jul	Aug	Sep	Oct	Nov	Dec	Year
Mean daily maximum °C (°F)	31.1 (88.0)	30.7 (87.3)	31.1 (88.0)	30.8 (87.4)	29.0 (84.2)	28.0 (82.4)	28.8 (83.8)	30.8 (87.4)	32.0 (89.6)	32.5 (90.5)	31.9 (89.4)	31.3 (88.3)	30.7 (87.2)
Daily mean °C (°F)	26.9 (80.4)	26.7 (80.1)	26.8 (80.2)	26.0 (78.8)	23.9 (75.0)	22.5 (72.5)	22.4 (72.3)	23.7 (74.7)	25.3 (77.5)	26.9 (80.4)	26.9 (80.4)	27.0 (80.6)	25.4 (77.7)
Mean daily minimum °C (°F)	22.8 (73.0)	22.6 (72.7)	22.5 (72.5)	21.1 (70.0)	18.8 (65.8)	17.1 (62.8)	15.8 (60.4)	16.7 (62.1)	18.6 (65.5)	21.1 (70.0)	21.9 (71.4)	22.6 (72.7)	20.1 (68.2)
Average precipitation mm (inches)	312.4 (12.30)	290.7 (11.44)	251.4 (9.90)	139.3 (5.48)	104.2 (4.10)	64.8 (2.55)	41.7 (1.64)	45.3 (1.78)	76.8 (3.02)	145.5 (5.73)	178.2 (7.02)	271.4 (10.69)	1,921.7 (75.65)
Average precipitation days	14.2	13.2	12.0	7.6	6.8	4.4	3.2	3.1	4.7	7.2	8.8	12.1	97.3
Source: Servicio Nacional de Meteorología e Hidrología de Bolivia

== Population ==
The town population has risen from 4,832 (census 1992) to 9,064 (census 2001) and 10,054 (census 2012).

== Languages ==
Camba Spanish is the primary vernacular lingua franca spoken in the town. Ignaciano, a Moxo dialect, is the main indigenous language spoken.

== Government ==
The current mayor of San Ignacio de Moxos is Basilio Nolvani Nojune (of the MAS-IPSP party), who was elected in the 4 April 2010 elections and took office in late May 2010.

Date Began	Date Ended	Governor	Party	Notes
Jan 2005	2006	Sixto Vejarano Congo	CPEM-B	Former President, Subcentral of TIMI
8 Aug 2006		Elizabeth Zelada	PODEMOS	Came to power after no-confidence vote by the Council in Vejerano
30 May 2010		Basilio Nolvani Nojune	MAS-IPSP	Won 51.5% in April election

== Gallery ==
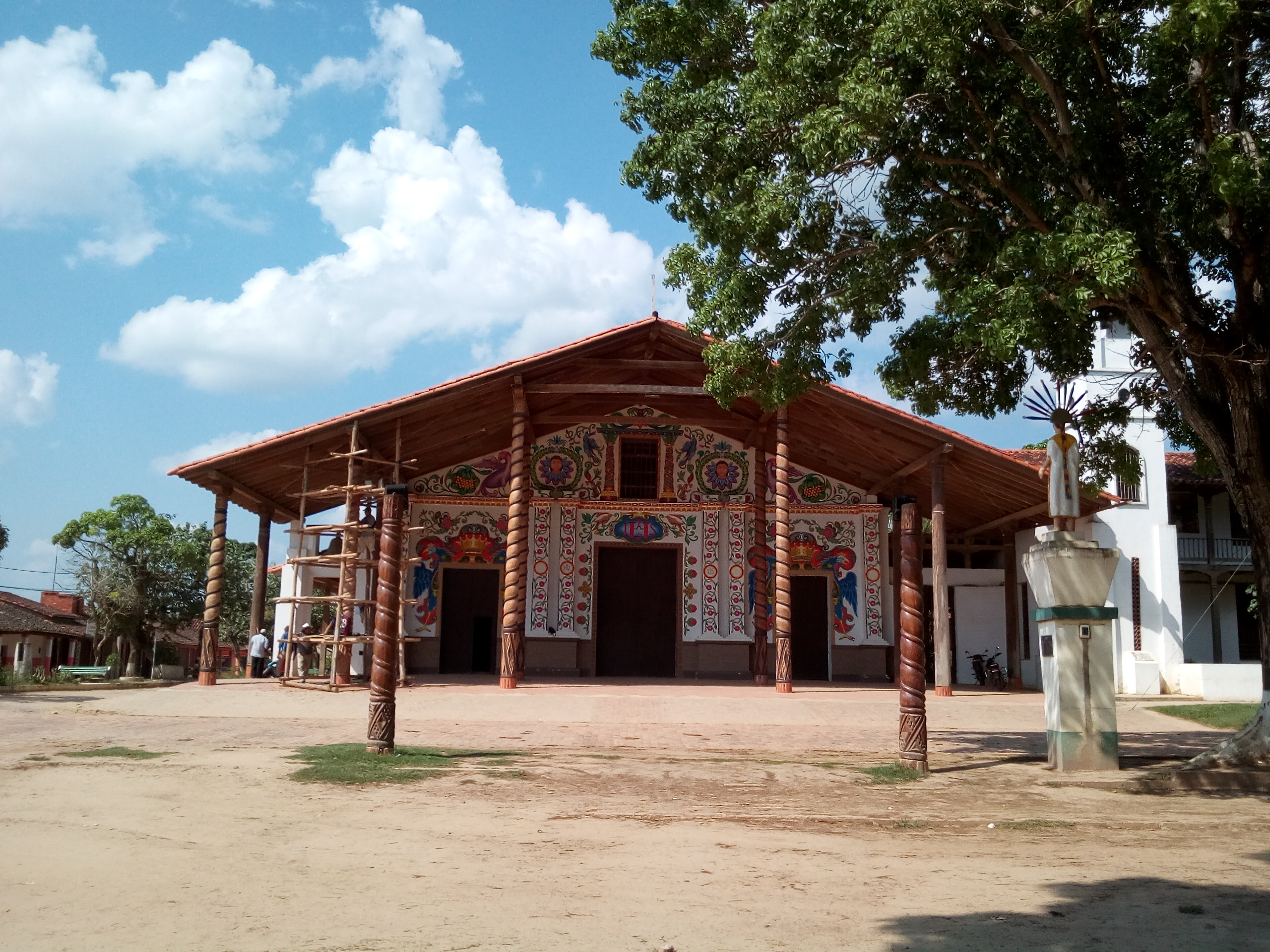
San Ignacio de Moxos mission church

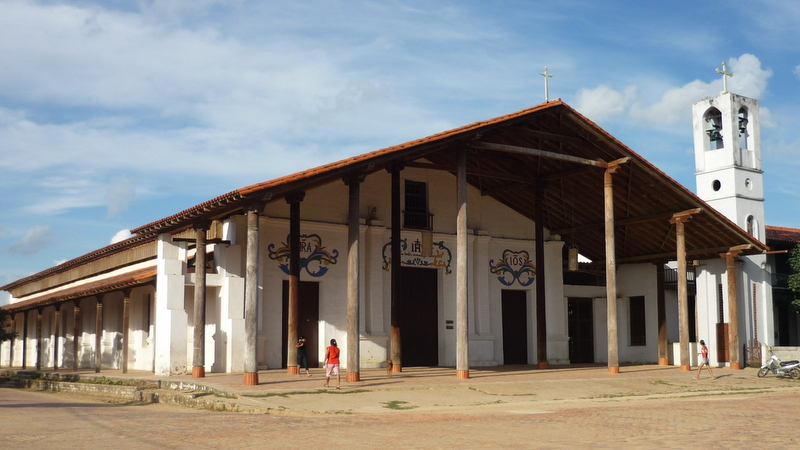
San Ignacio de Moxos mission church

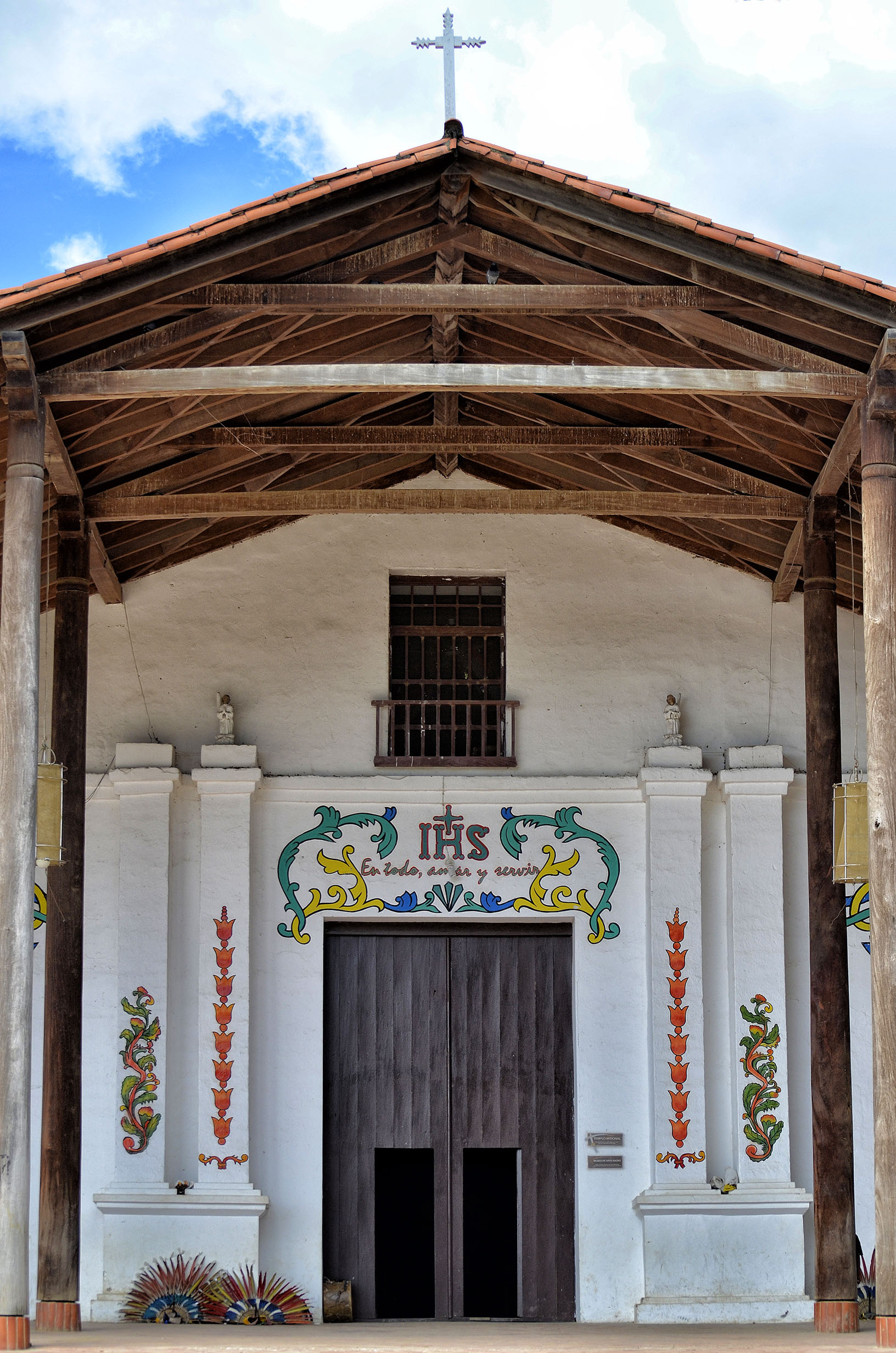
San Ignacio de Moxos mission church frontal view

== See also ==
- Villa Tunari – San Ignacio de Moxos Highway
