= Moxos Province =

Coordinates: 15.667°S 65.917°W

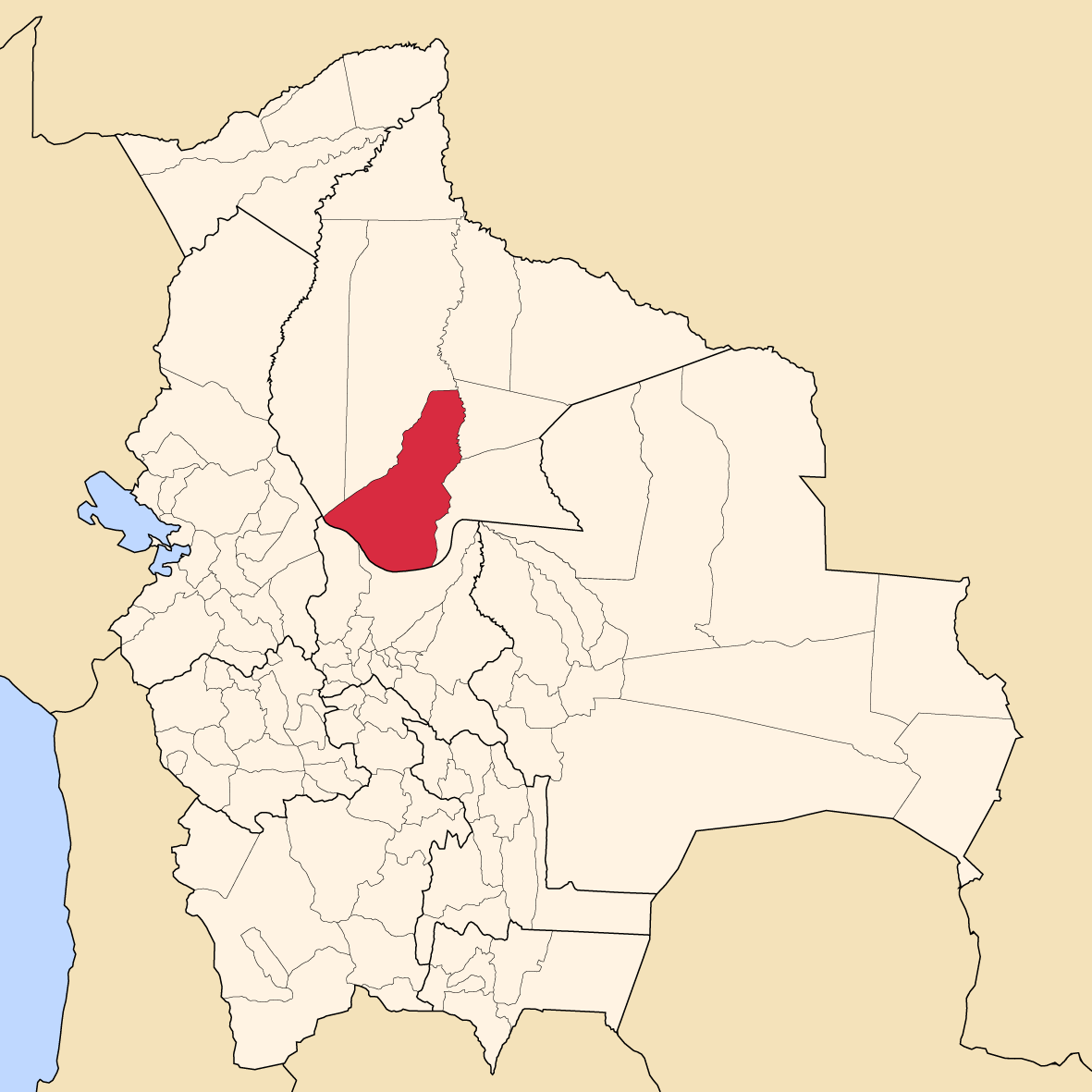
Location of Moxos Province

Moxos is a province in the Beni Department, Bolivia. It is named after the Moxos savanna.

The province consists of one municipality, San Ignacio de Moxos Municipality, which is identical to the province. The province is divided into three cantons:

- San Francisco Canton - 2,684 inhabitants (2001)
- San Ignacio Canton - 17,387 inhabitants
- San Lorenzo Canton - 1,572 inhabitants

== Places of interest ==
- Isiboro Sécure National Park and Indigenous Territory

== See also ==
- Llanos de Moxos
- Llanos de Moxos (archaeology)
- Moxos people
- Moxos language
- Villa Tunari – San Ignacio de Moxos Highway
