= San Javier, Beni =

Coordinates: 14.6008°S 64.8808°W

San Javier (Beni)
- Town
- Interactive map of San Javier (Beni)
- Country: Bolivia
- Time zone: UTC-4 (BOT)

San Javier (Beni) is a small town in Bolivia.

== Languages ==
Camba Spanish is the primary vernacular lingua franca spoken in the town. Javierano, a Moxo dialect, is the main indigenous language spoken.
