= San Javier Municipality, Beni =

Coordinates: 14°20′S 64°30′W

San Javier Municipality
- Municipality
- Interactive map of San Javier Municipality
- Country: Bolivia
- Department: Beni Department
- Province: Cercado
- Time zone: UTC-4 (BOT)

San Javier Municipality is a municipality of the Beni Department, Bolivia.
