= Trinidad, Beni =

La Santísima Trinidad Trinidad
- City
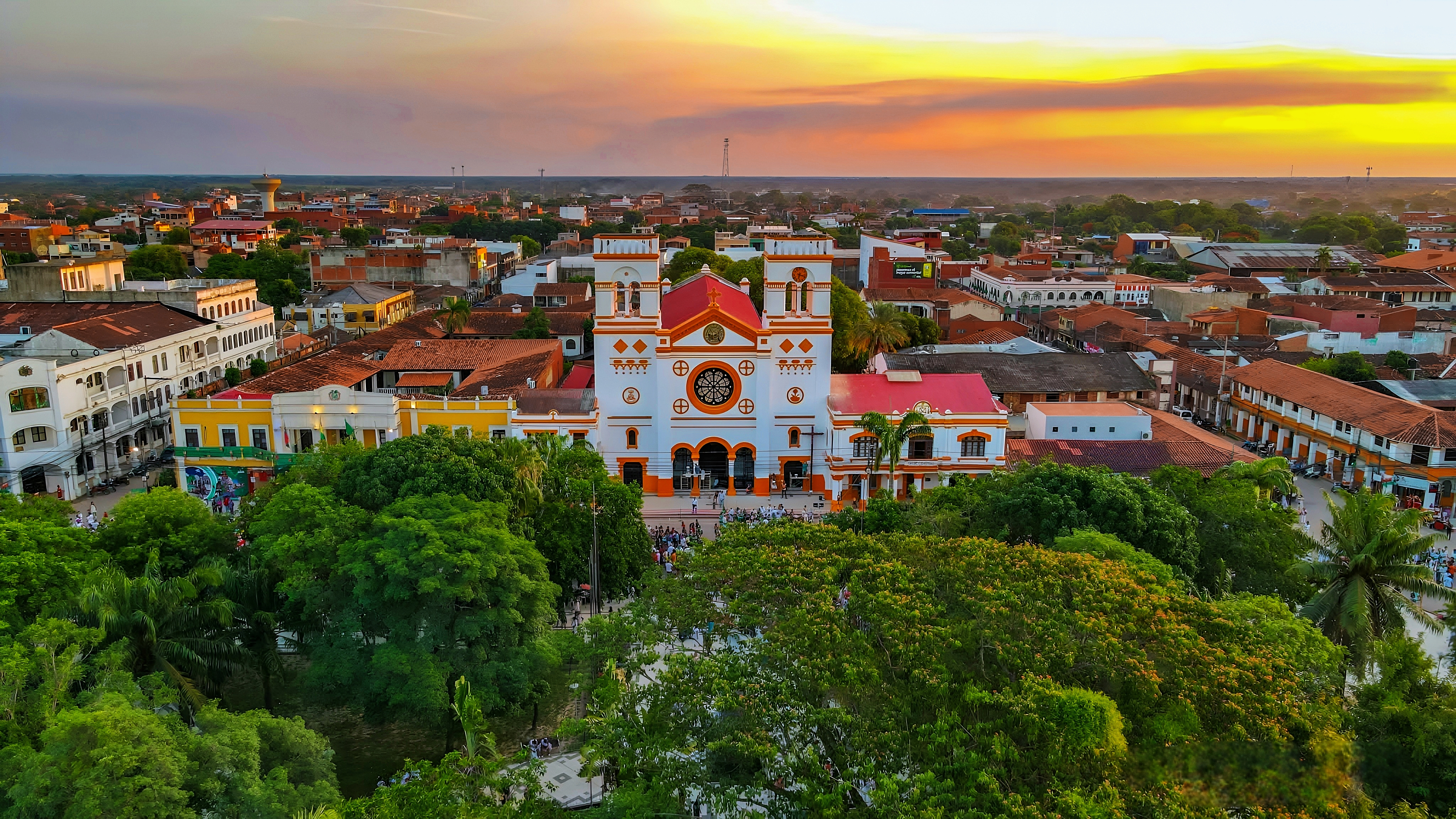
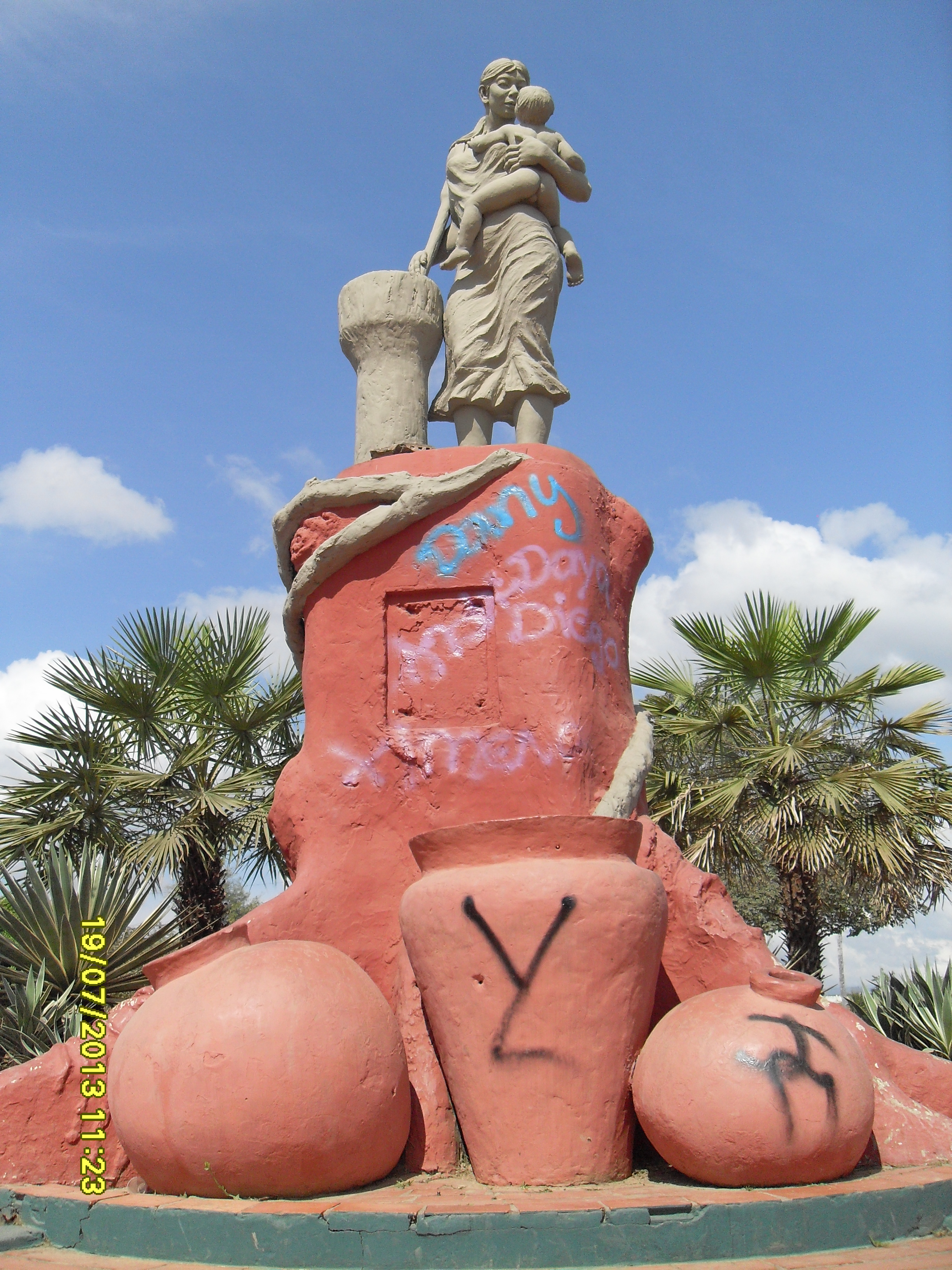
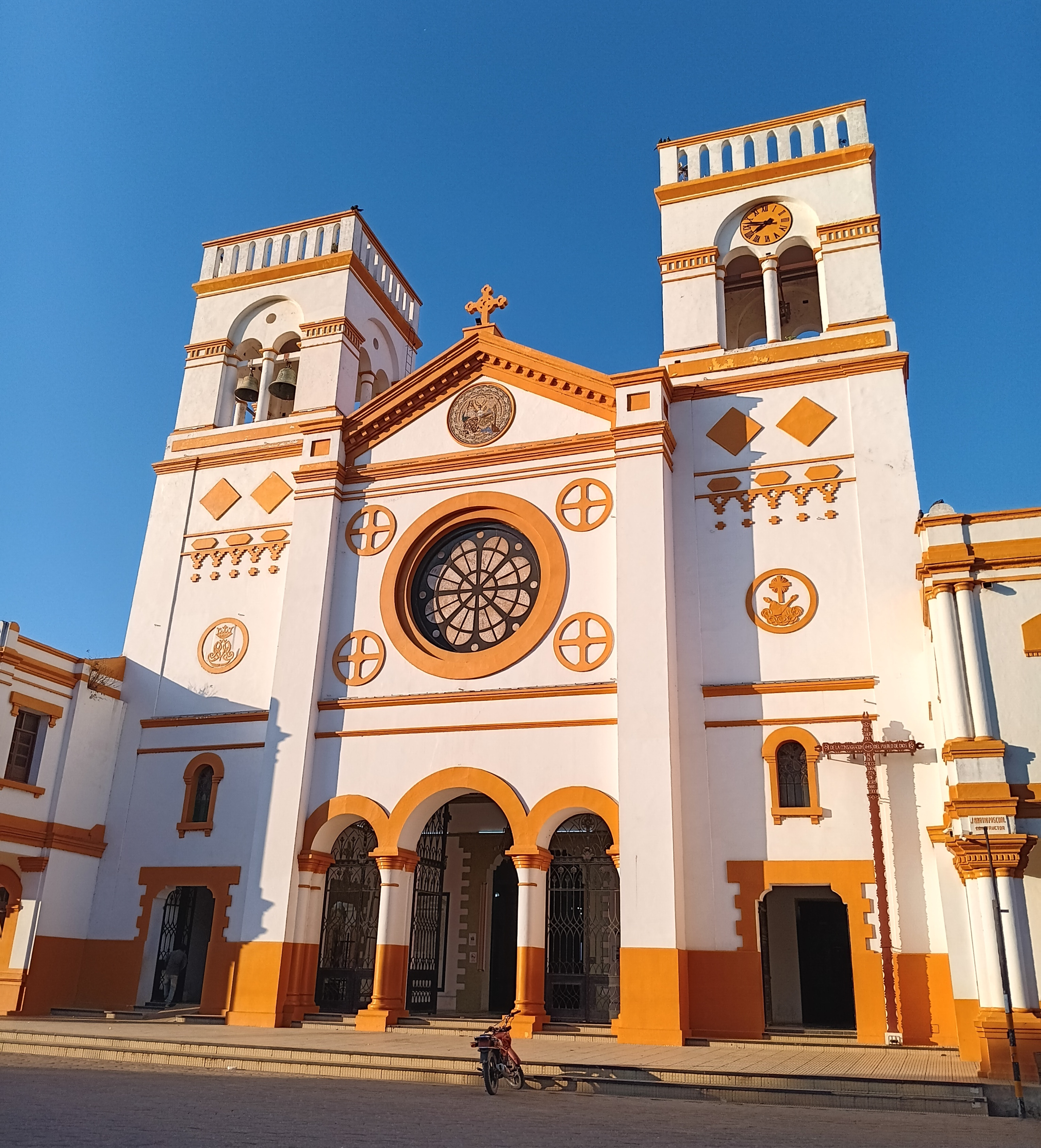
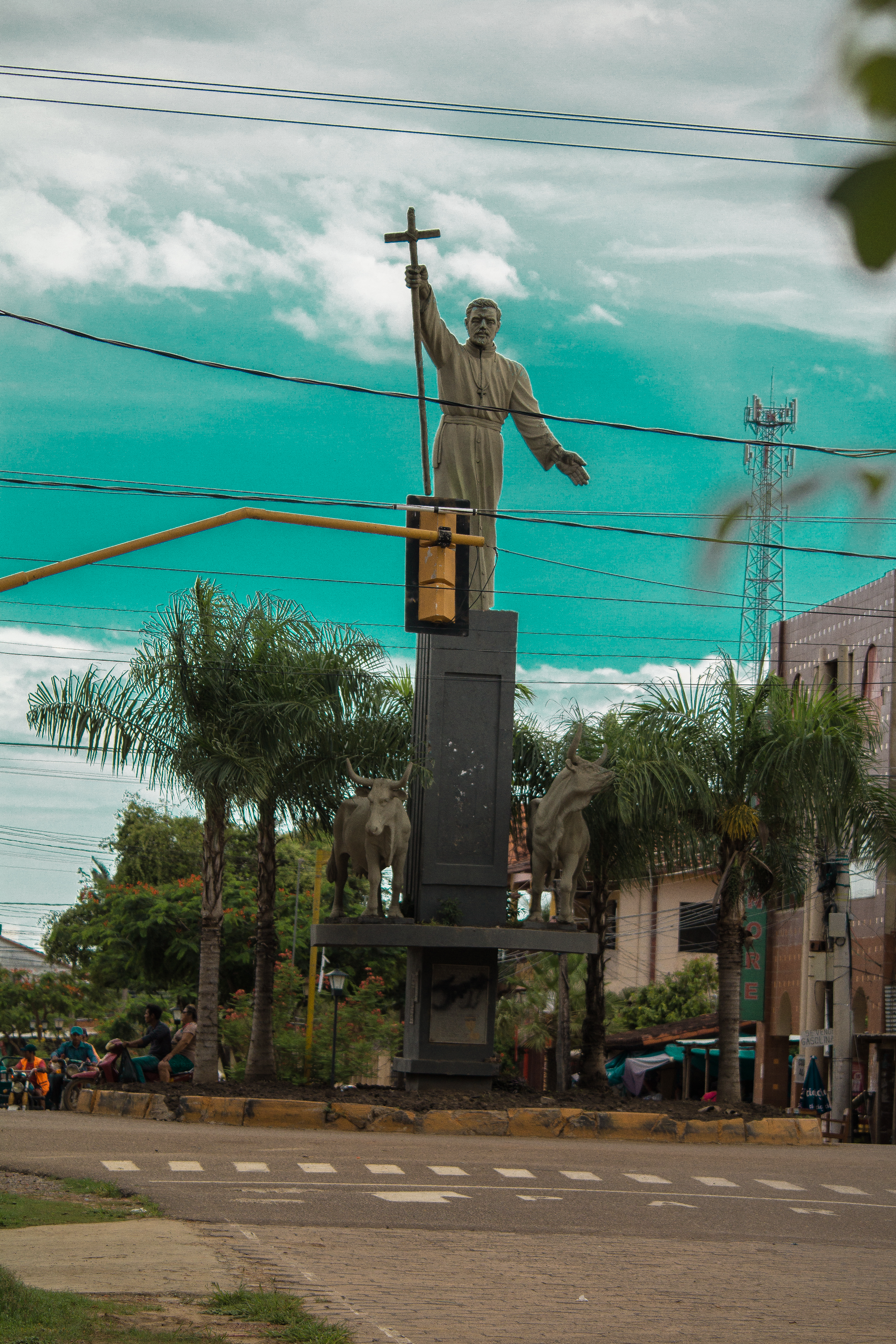
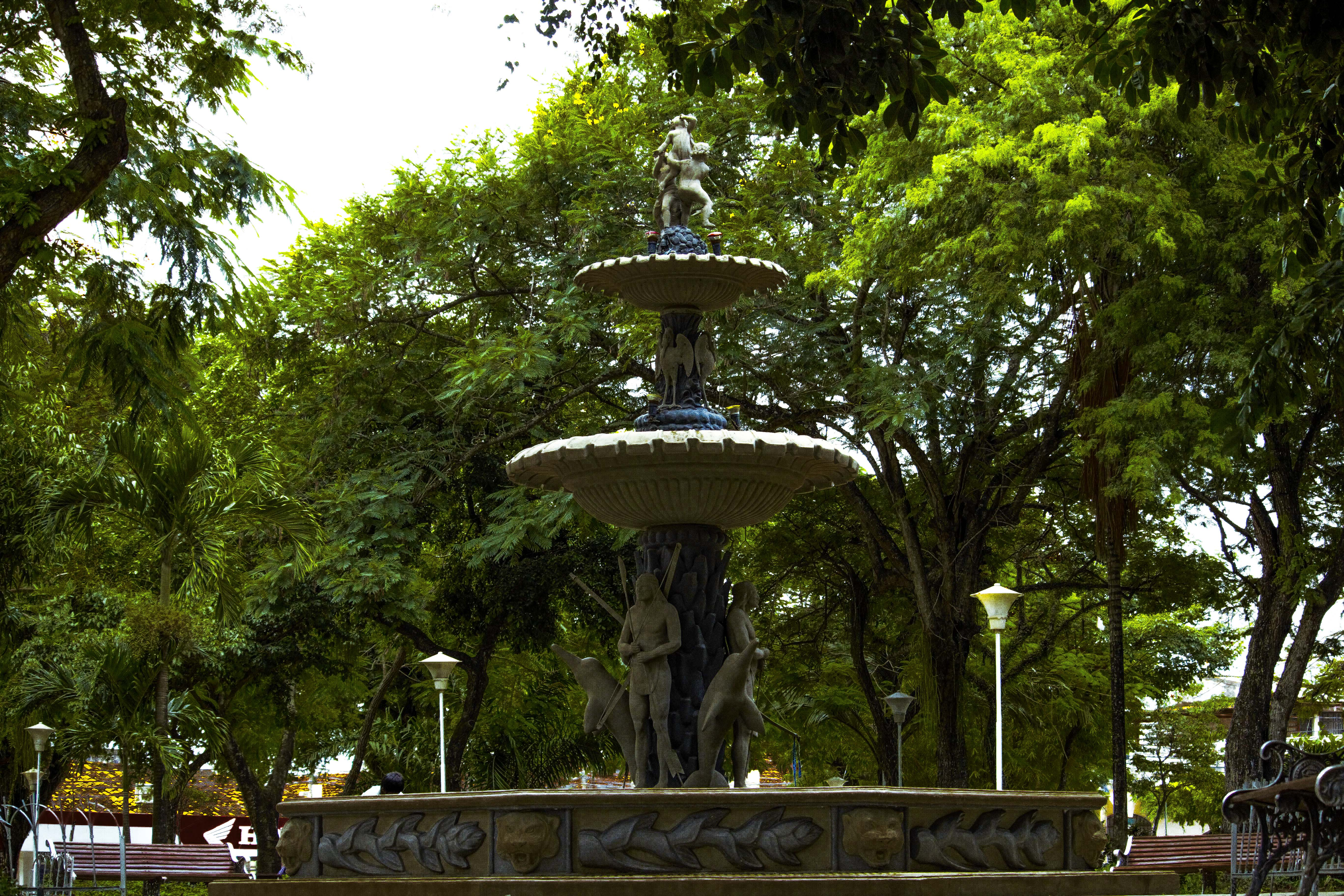
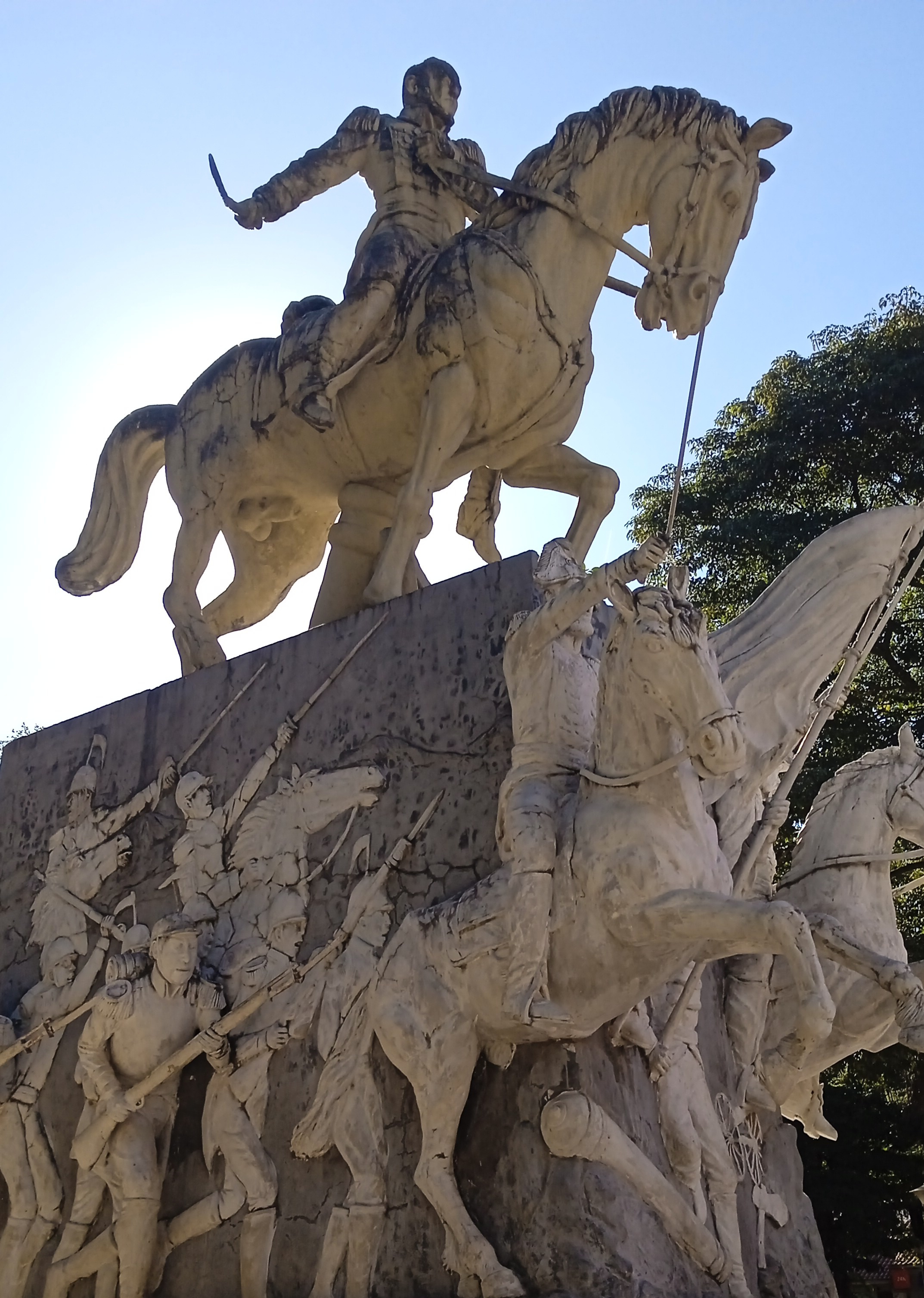
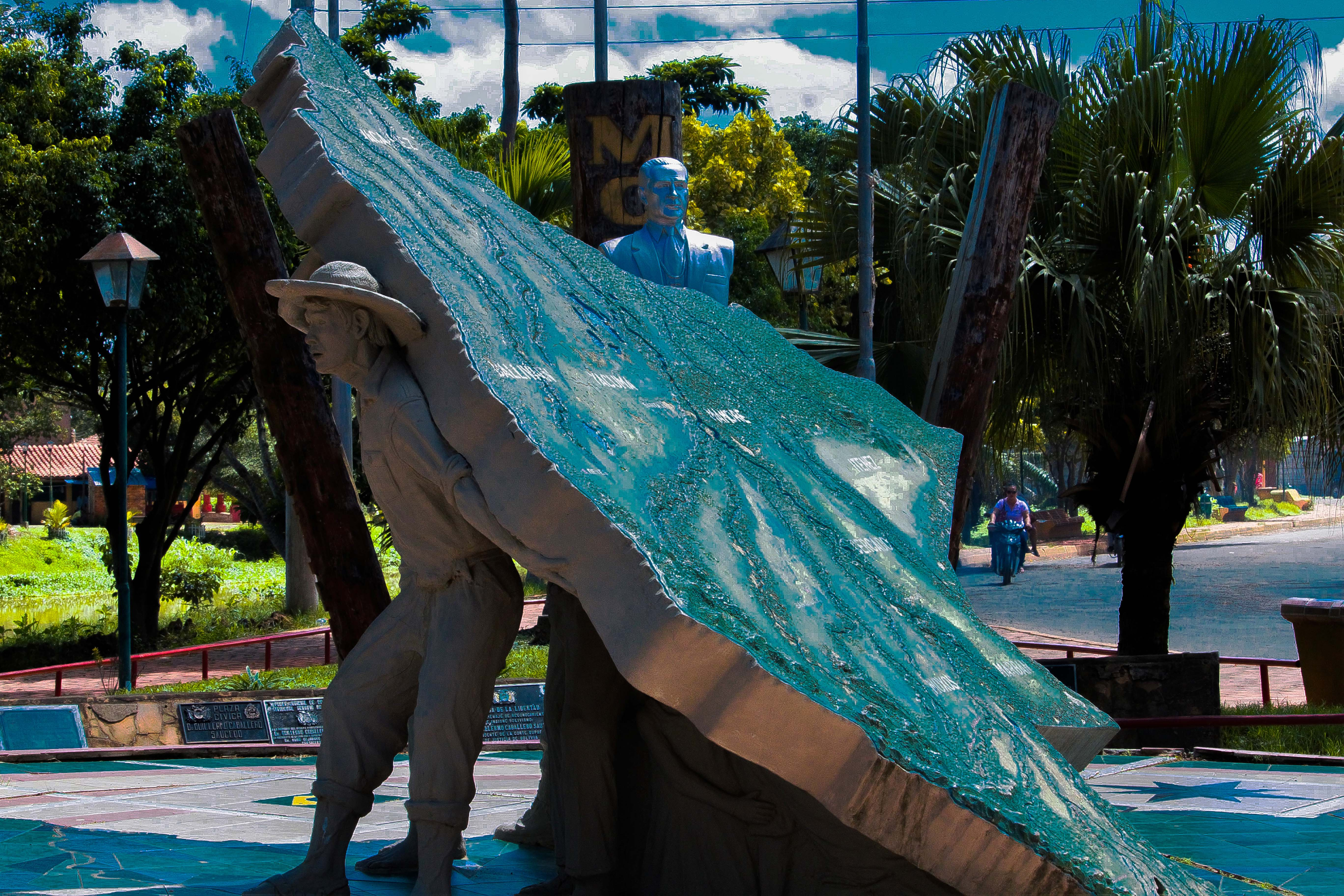
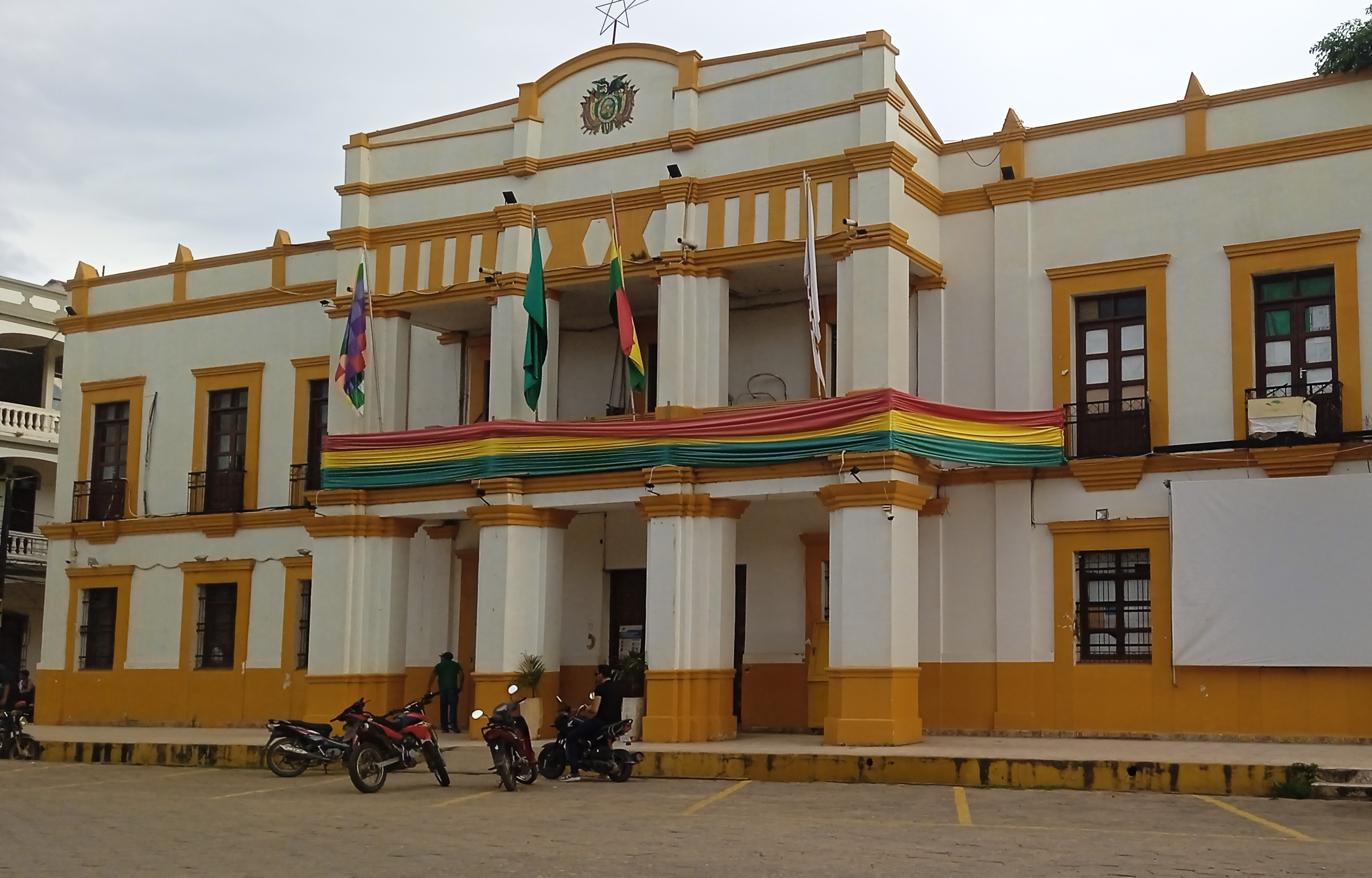
- Aerial view of Trinidad Monument to Mother India Cathedral of the Holy Trinity Monument to Cipriano Barace water fountain in the Main Square Statue to José Ballivián Monument to the Progress of Beni Trinidad mayor's office

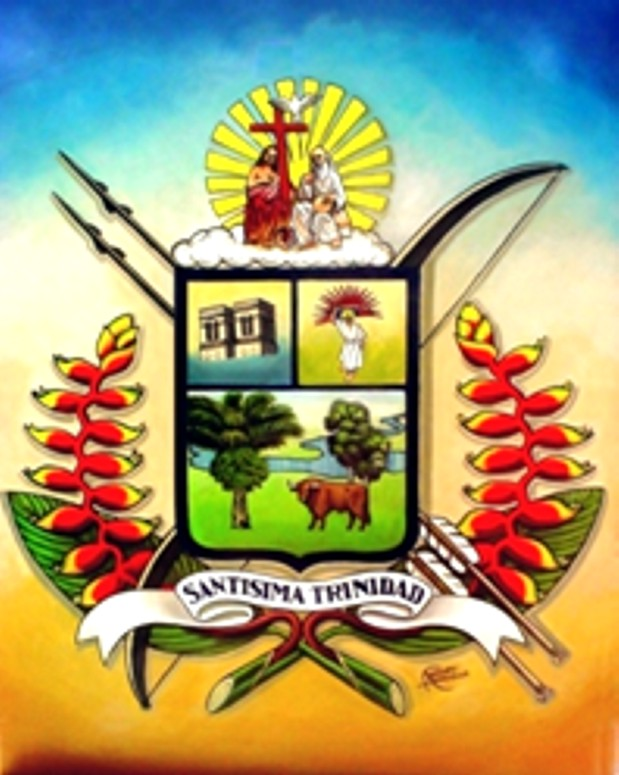
- Flag Coat of arms
- Motto: "Green Trinidad"
- Location within Bolivia
- Coordinates: 14°49′45″S 64°54′5″W
- Country: Bolivia
- Department: Beni
- Province: Cercado
- Founded: 1686

Government
  - Mayor: Jorge Hurtado

Area
  - City: 27 km^{2} (10 sq mi)
- Elevation: 130 m (430 ft)

Population (2020 Census)
  - Urban: 130,657
- Time zone: UTC-4
- Area code: +591 346
- Climate: Am
- Website: Official website

Trinidad, officially La Santísima Trinidad (lit. 'The Most Holy Trinity'), is a city in Bolivia, capital of the department of Beni. The population is 130,000 (2010 official estimate). While historically a peripheral city in Bolivia, Trinidad is today an important center for the Bolivian Bovine industry and has enjoyed a modest economic boom in recent years and has an HDI index of above 0.700.

While technically on the periphery of the Amazon rainforest, Trinidad is a wet monsoonal location that is connected by the Mamoré river to the greater Amazon Basin. While wet enough to be a rainforest in total annual precipitation, dry monsoonal weather separates the year into dry and wet seasons as is common throughout much of the greater Amazon basin, particularly to the southeast.

Trinidad is a growing city of medium size, and while not an important national center, has grown in importance for the local economy of the Bolivian orient north of Santa Cruz de la Sierra.

The city is also home to the Bolivian Navy flotilla.

== History ==
The city was founded in 1686 by Father Cipriano Barace. In 1769, the town moved to its current location, 9 miles away, due to flooding. The original city was on the Mamoré River, but flooding and disease forced a move on the location of the city. It is located in the province of Cercado, one of Beni’s eight provinces.

== Languages ==
Camba Spanish is the primary vernacular lingua franca spoken in the town. Trinitário, a Moxo dialect, is the main indigenous language spoken.

== Infrastructure ==
One of the more notable features of the city is the open drains that surrounds every block of buildings. These are linked together by lidded ditches and thence to the local river. These are necessary due to the heavy rainfall that occurs between December and May.

== City ==
Trinidad, located at the southern edge of the Amazon basin on the Llanos de Moxos, is hot and humid most of the year. This region of the country is heavily forested and many large rivers (all tributaries of the Amazon) run through Beni. Like most cities in Bolivia, it is built around a central plaza with a large Catholic cathedral as its centerpiece. Trinidad was originally a small Jesuit town but is now a large city with over 100,000 inhabitants. Its mission-style church was demolished and rebuilt in 1923. Despite these changes, many of the original religious relics, paintings and statues are still housed in the cathedral, which faces the main plaza.

== Climate ==
Under the Köppen climate classification, Trinidad has a tropical monsoon climate (Am) with a lengthy rainy season and a short dry season. The area receives ample rainfall, but is divided sharply between wet and dry seasons. Trinidad is technically Bolivia's wettest departmental capital, with over 1,400 millimetres or 55 inches more rain falling than in the capital La Paz (which receives around 600 millimetres or 24 inches).

Climate data for Trinidad (Teniente Jorge Henrich Arauz Airport), elevation 156 m (512 ft)
| Month | Jan | Feb | Mar | Apr | May | Jun | Jul | Aug | Sep | Oct | Nov | Dec | Year |
|---|---|---|---|---|---|---|---|---|---|---|---|---|---|
| Record high °C (°F) | 40.3 (104.5) | 39.8 (103.6) | 36.2 (97.2) | 36.7 (98.1) | 35.5 (95.9) | 36.0 (96.8) | 37.2 (99.0) | 39.4 (102.9) | 43.2 (109.8) | 40.2 (104.4) | 40.0 (104.0) | 41.2 (106.2) | 43.2 (109.8) |
| Mean daily maximum °C (°F) | 31.2 (88.2) | 30.9 (87.6) | 31.2 (88.2) | 30.7 (87.3) | 29.4 (84.9) | 28.7 (83.7) | 29.4 (84.9) | 31.2 (88.2) | 32.4 (90.3) | 32.8 (91.0) | 32.1 (89.8) | 31.5 (88.7) | 31.0 (87.7) |
| Daily mean °C (°F) | 26.8 (80.2) | 26.8 (80.2) | 26.8 (80.2) | 26.0 (78.8) | 24.3 (75.7) | 23.0 (73.4) | 22.8 (73.0) | 24.2 (75.6) | 25.8 (78.4) | 26.9 (80.4) | 26.9 (80.4) | 26.8 (80.2) | 25.6 (78.0) |
| Mean daily minimum °C (°F) | 22.5 (72.5) | 22.6 (72.7) | 22.5 (72.5) | 21.3 (70.3) | 19.1 (66.4) | 17.3 (63.1) | 16.2 (61.2) | 17.1 (62.8) | 19.1 (66.4) | 21.0 (69.8) | 21.6 (70.9) | 22.2 (72.0) | 20.2 (68.4) |
| Record low °C (°F) | 14.8 (58.6) | 15.5 (59.9) | 13.0 (55.4) | 10.9 (51.6) | 7.0 (44.6) | 4.0 (39.2) | 2.0 (35.6) | 6.2 (43.2) | 9.0 (48.2) | 11.3 (52.3) | 10.1 (50.2) | 11.0 (51.8) | 2.0 (35.6) |
| Average precipitation mm (inches) | 308.0 (12.13) | 255.8 (10.07) | 221.3 (8.71) | 121.5 (4.78) | 98.4 (3.87) | 51.2 (2.02) | 40.2 (1.58) | 38.4 (1.51) | 92.1 (3.63) | 137.8 (5.43) | 197.5 (7.78) | 259.1 (10.20) | 1,821.3 (71.71) |
| Average precipitation days | 16.6 | 15.0 | 13.2 | 8.8 | 7.5 | 4.8 | 3.5 | 3.4 | 5.7 | 8.7 | 11.2 | 15.1 | 113.5 |
| Average relative humidity (%) | 79.6 | 80.2 | 78.6 | 76.5 | 76.1 | 74.9 | 69.8 | 64.9 | 65.6 | 69.8 | 73.8 | 77.9 | 74.0 |
Source: Servicio Nacional de Meteorología e Hidrología de Bolivia

== Tourism ==
The city is surrounded by rivers, lakes and lagoons. There are many river tours and restaurants and resorts around the city’s main lagoons. Trinidad is also one of the first five Jesuit mission towns established and these are now part of the Misiones tour includes visits to San Javier, Loreto, San Pedro and San Ignacio de Moxos as well. Trinidad and San Ignacio de Moxos both take part in the International Baroque Music Festival every two years in Bolivia.

Trinidad has two museums. The Museo Itícola (Fish Fauna Museum) is the third largest of its kind in South America and houses over 400 specimens of fish species found in the region’s lakes and lagoons. It is located on the Universidad Autónoma del Beni (UAB) campus. Visitors can see tiny fish, piranhas, and a preserved pink river dolphin (floating in formaldehyde). The Kenneth Lee Ethno-Archeological Museum has exhibits of pottery, utensils and tools, textiles and other implements used by the Moxos culture.

Of interest to ornithologists, the blue-throated macaw (Ara glaucogularis) can be seen in the surrounding countryside.

== Transportation ==
The city is served by Teniente Jorge Henrich Arauz Airport.

== Gallery ==
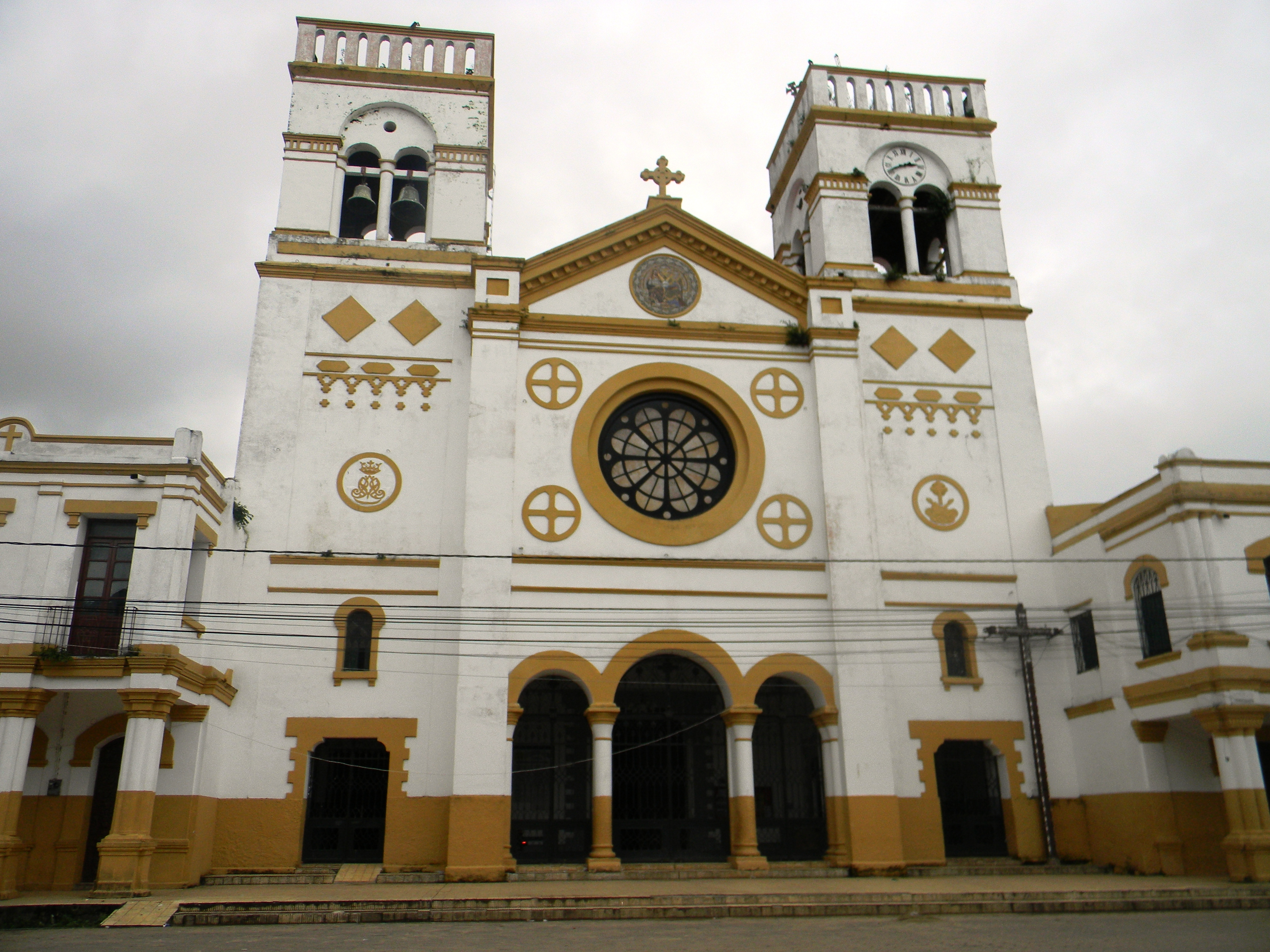
Trinidad Cathedral, in Bolivia

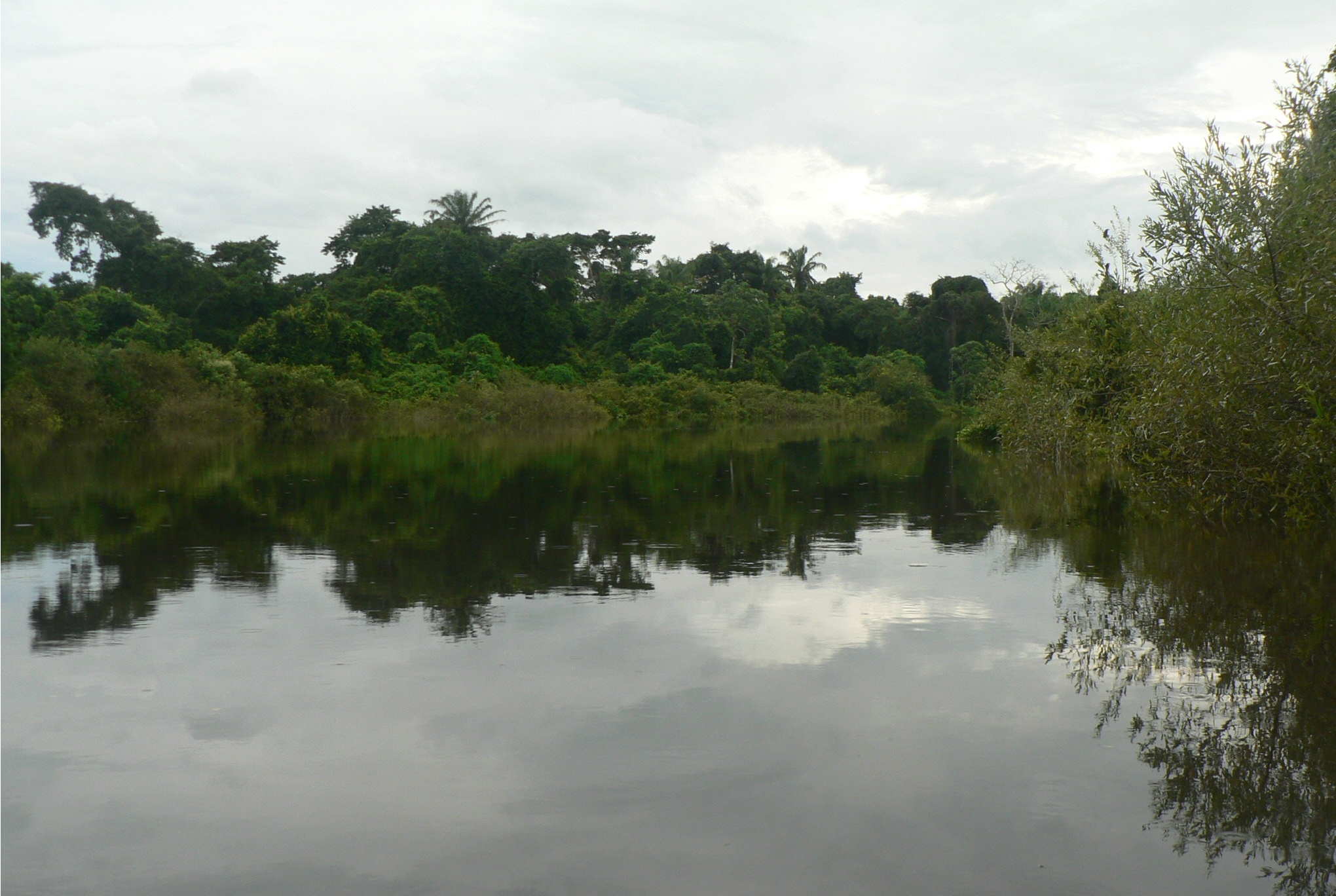
Ibaré River, Beni

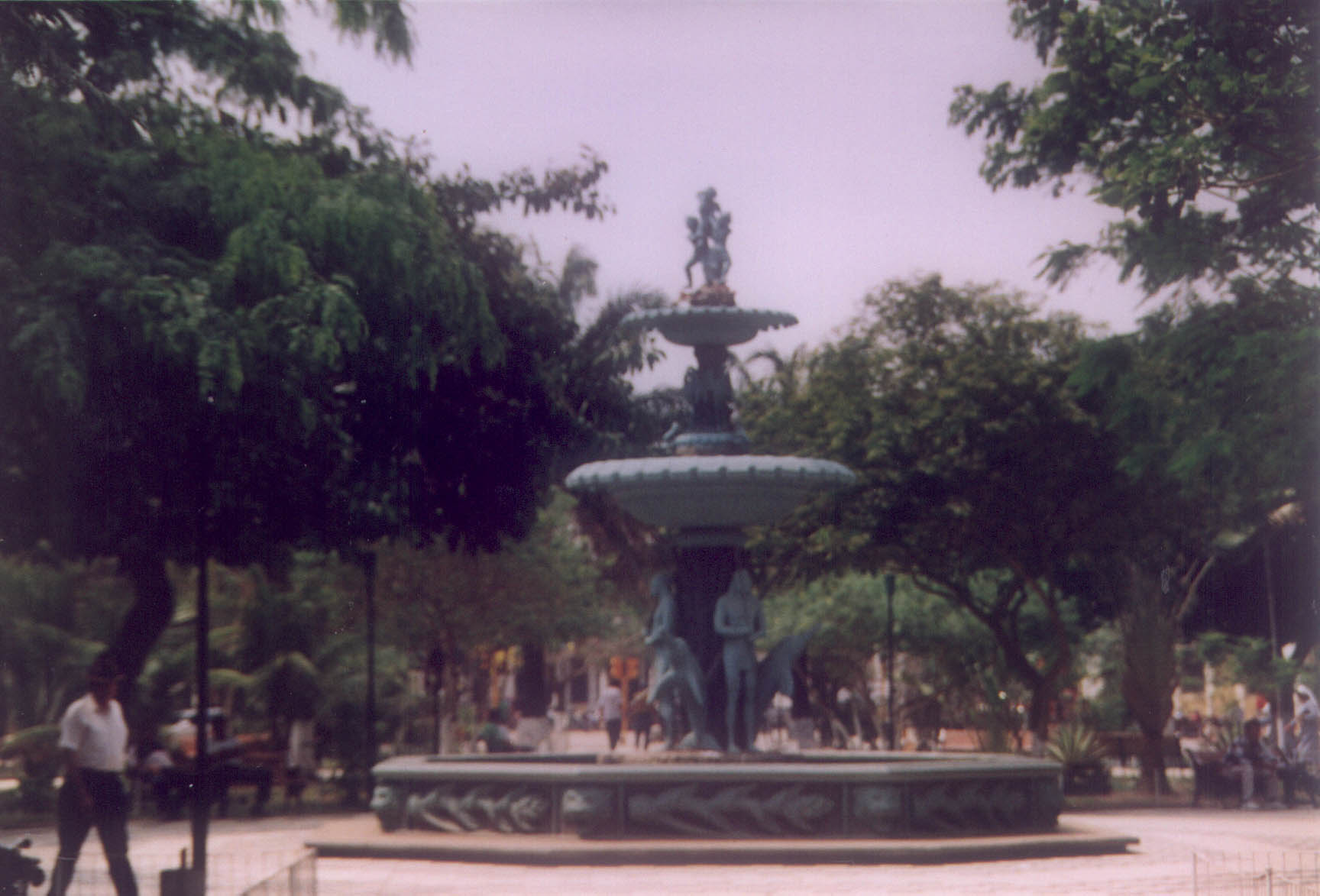
Square in Trinidad, Bolivia

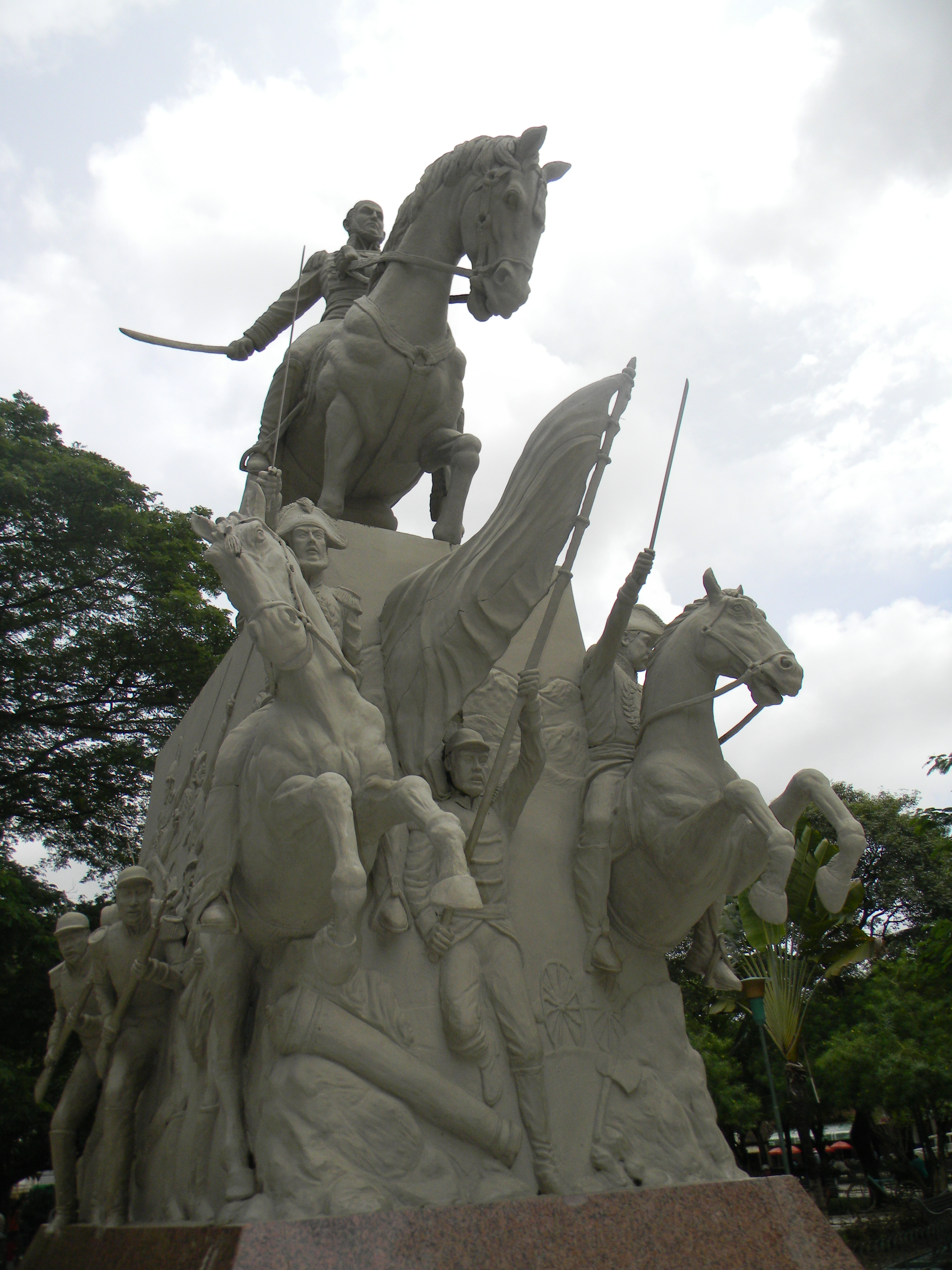
Monument in Trinidad

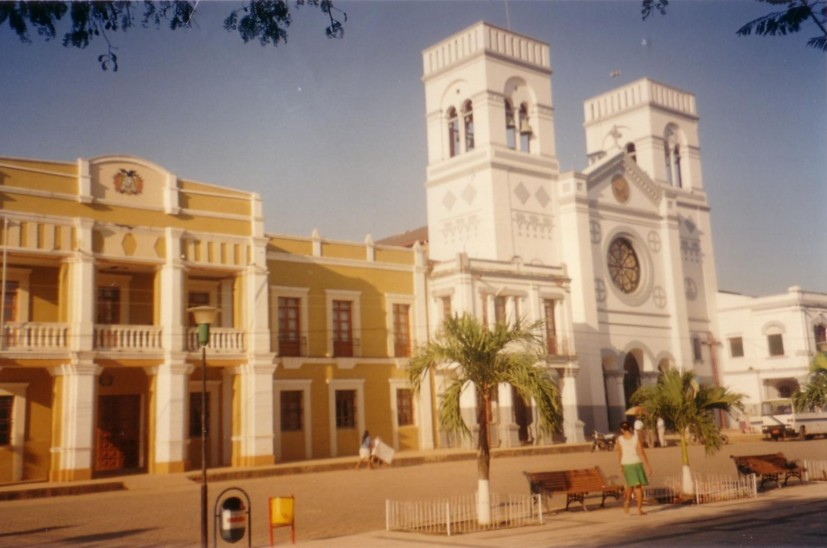
Trinidad Cathedral

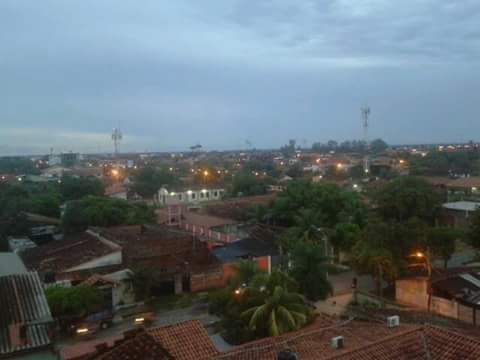
Trinidad, Bolivia

== Notable people ==
- Jeanine Áñez (born 1967), former President
- Hugo Dellien (born 1993), tennis player
- Murkel Dellien (born 1997), tennis player
- Asunta Limpias de Parada (1915–1995), composer, writer, singer, and pianist
- Alan Loras (born 1986), footballer
- Limbert Méndez (born 1982), footballer
- Osvaldo Peredo (1941–2021), physician and revolutionary leader
- Cristian Reynaldo (born 1978), football manager and former player
- Carolina Ribera (born 1990), dentist and daughter of President Jeanine Áñez
- Rolando Ribera (born 1983), footballer
- Erwin Rivero (born 1957), biochemist, pharmacist, and politician
- Estefany Rivero (born 1996), architect, model and beauty pageant titleholder
- Farides Vaca (born 1969), librarian and politician
- Pedro Zabála (born 1983), footballer
