= Moxo languages =

Arawakan subfamily of northeastern Bolivia

Moxo
- Mojos
- Geographic distribution: Beni Department
- Ethnicity: 21,000 Moxo people (2004)
- Native speakers: (10,000 cited 2000–2004)
- Linguistic classification: Arawakan: Southern; Bolivia–Parana; Moxo
- Subdivisions: Ignaciano; Trinitario

Language codes
- Glottolog: moxo1234 Mojeno magi1242 Magiana

Moxo (also known as Mojo, pronounced 'Moho') is a subgroup of the Arawakan languages spoken by the Moxo people of the Llanos de Moxos in northeastern Bolivia. The two extant languages of the Moxo people, Trinitario and Ignaciano, are as distinct from one another as they are from neighboring Arawakan languages. The extinct Magiana was also distinct.

The Moxo languages have an active–stative syntax. They are both National Languages of Bolivia.

== Sociolinguistic background ==
The languages belong to a group of tribes that originally ranged through the upper Mamoré, extending east and west from the Guapure (Itenes) to the Beni, and are now centered in the Province of Moxos, Department of Beni, Bolivia. They form part of the Mamoré-Guaporé linguistic area.

Moxo was also the primary lingua franca (Spanish: lengua general) used in the Jesuit Missions of Moxos.

== Classification ==
The Moxo languages are most closely related to Bauré, Pauna, and Paikoneka. Together, they form the Mamoré-Guaporé languages (named after the Mamoré River and Guaporé River).

=== Jolkesky (2016) ===
Classification by Jolkesky (2016):

- Mamoré-Guaporé languages
  - Bauré
    - Bauré
    - Carmelito
    - Joaquiniano
    - Muxojeóne
  - Moxeno
    - Ignaciano
    - Trinitário
    - Loretano
    - Javierano
  - Paikoneka
    - Paikoneka
  - Paunaka
    - Paunaka

=== Danielsen (2011) ===
Classification by Danielsen (2011) and Danielsen & Terhart (2014: 226):

- Baure languages
  - Bauré
  - Carmelito
  - Joaquiniano
- Pauna languages
  - Paunaka
  - Paikoneka
- Mojo languages
  - Trinitário
  - Ignaciano
  - Loretano
  - Javierano
  - Muchojeone

== Vocabulary ==
Magíana word list from the late 1700s published in Palau and Saiz (1989):

Spanish gloss	English gloss	Magíana
bueno	good	chimaré
malo	bad	mononeparé
el padre	father	nuuhá
la madre	mother	nuuhéno
el hermano	brother	nuuhamí
uno	one	piyochó
dos	two	tonocovó
tres	three	mopoicovó

No words were recorded for numerals higher than 3.
