= Madeira River =

Tributary of the Amazon River

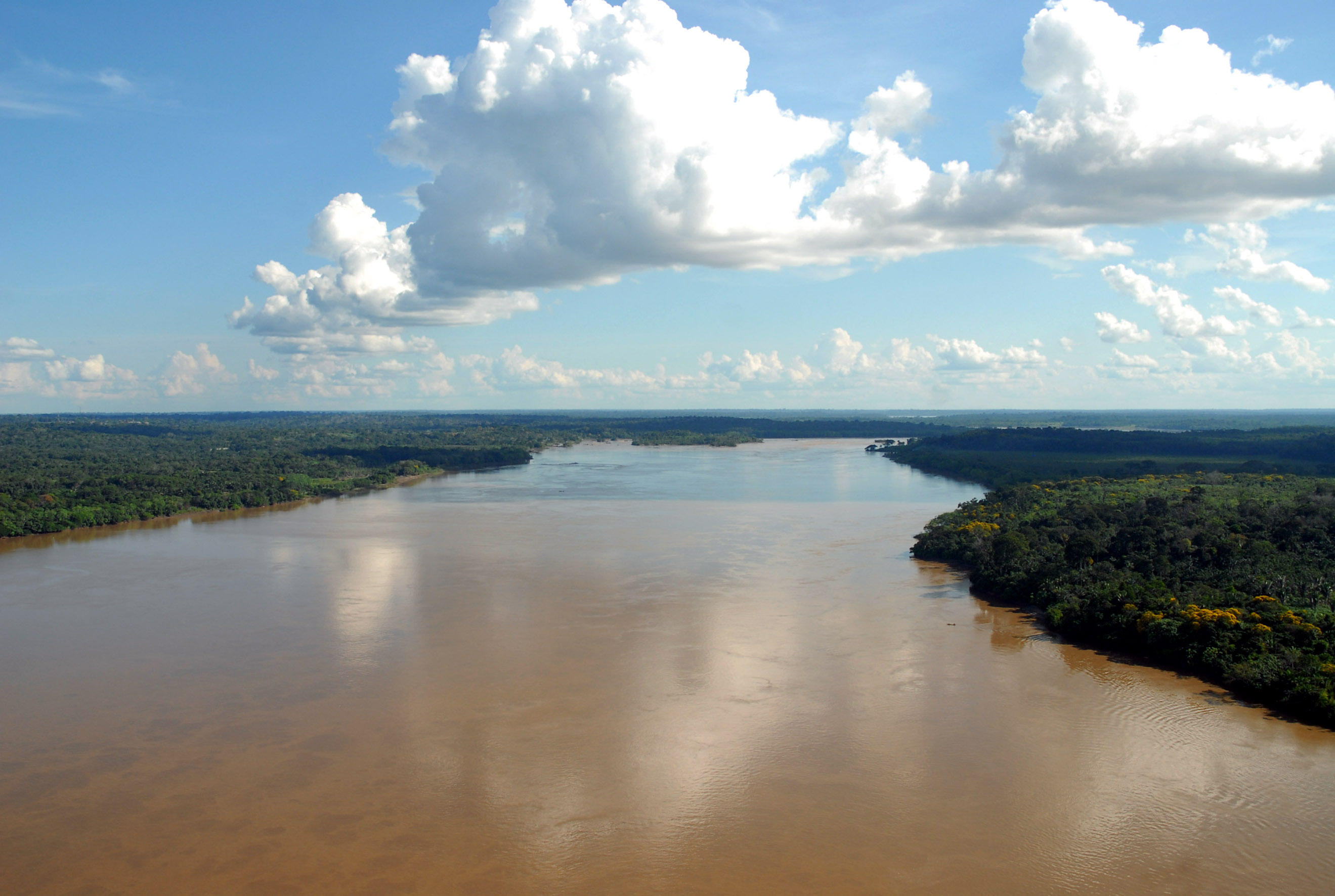
- The river in the outskirts of Porto Velho

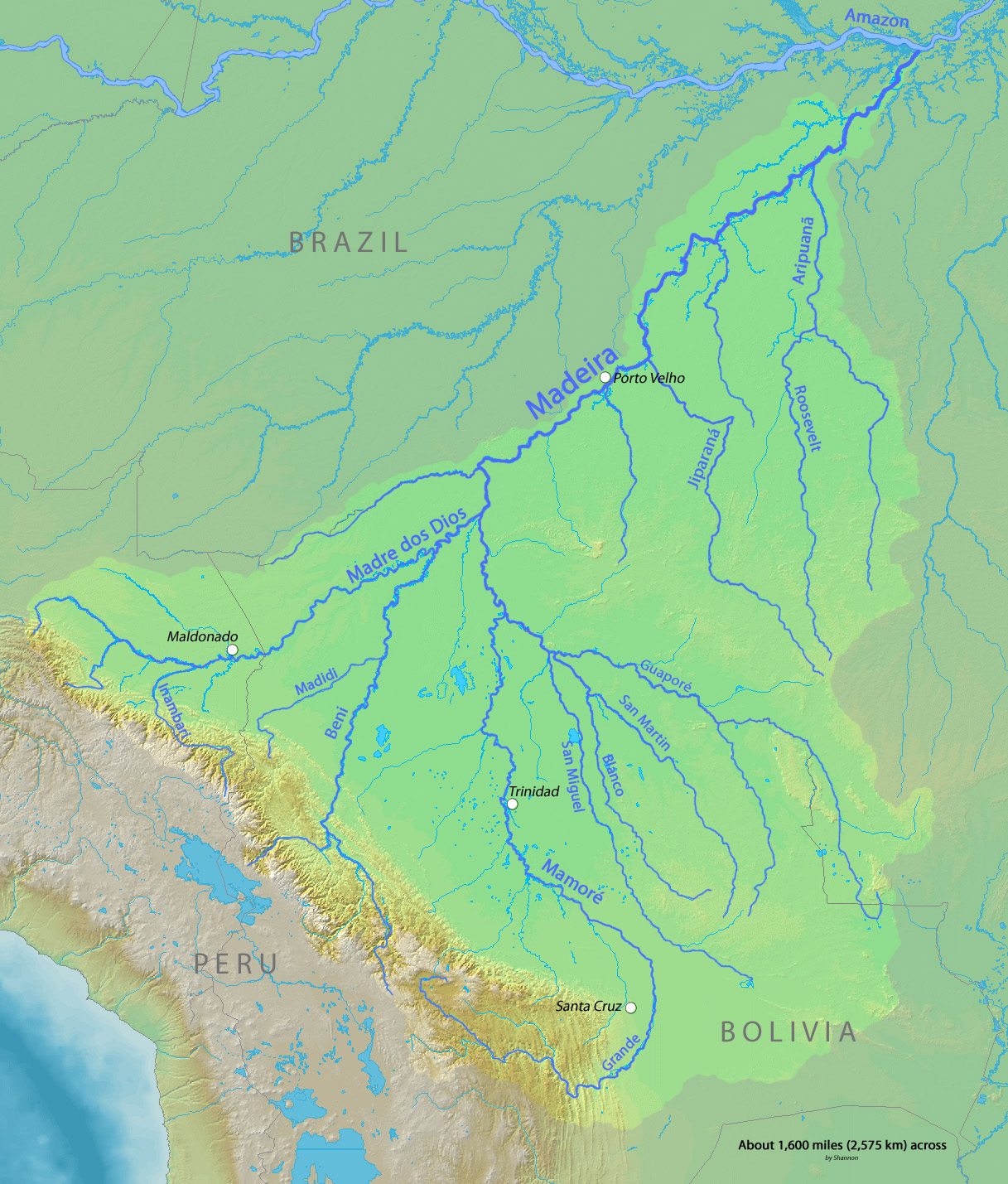
- Map of the Madeira River watershed
- Etymology: Portuguese, "wood river"

Location
- Country: Bolivia, Brazil
- Cities: Nova Olinda do Norte, Borba, Novo Aripuanã, Manicoré, Humaitá, Porto Velho

Physical characteristics
- Source: Confluence of Madre de Dios and Mamoré
  - location: Near Guayaramerín, Bolivia
  - coordinates: 10°38′19″S 65°39′20″W
  - elevation: 180 m (590 ft)
- Mouth: Amazon River
  - location: Amazonas, Brazil
  - coordinates: 3°22′32″S 58°46′23″W
  - elevation: 40 m (130 ft)
- Length: 1,450 km (900 mi); 3,250 km (2,020 mi) Madeira-Mamoré River
- Basin size: 1,376,000 km^{2} (531,000 mi^{2})
- Discharge
  - location: near mouth
  - average: (Period: 1973–1990)31,200 m^{3}/s (1,100,000 cu ft/s)
  - minimum: 2,346 m^{3}/s (82,800 cu ft/s)
  - maximum: 52,804 m^{3}/s (1,864,800 cu ft/s)

Basin features
- Progression: Amazon → Atlantic Ocean
- River system: Amazon
- Tributaries
  - left: Madre de Dios, Abunã
  - right: Mamoré, Jamari, Ji-Paraná, Marmelos, Manicoré, Mataurá, Mariepauá, Aripuanã

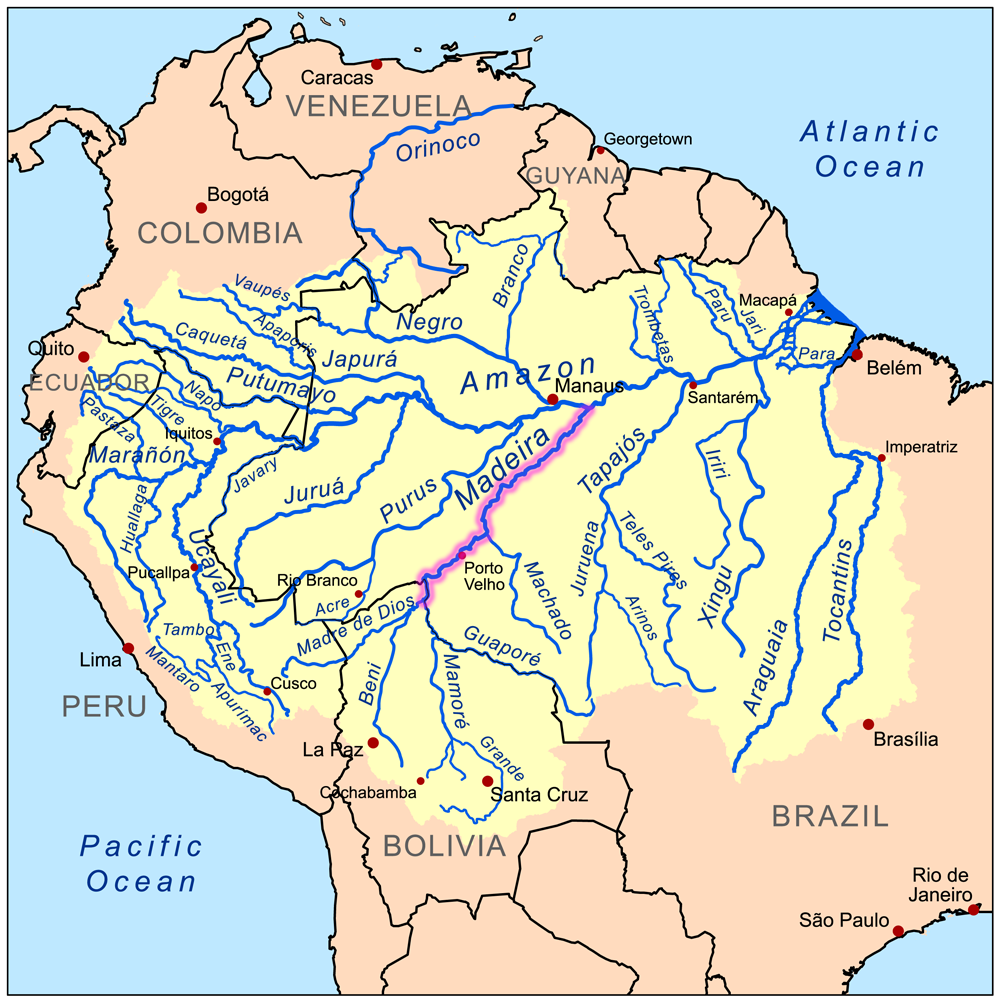
Map of the Amazon Basin with the Madeira River highlighted

The Madeira River (Portuguese: Rio Madeira [maˈdejɾɐ]) is a major waterway in South America. It is estimated to be 1,450 km (900 mi) in length, while the Madeira-Mamoré is estimated near 3,250 km (2,020 mi) or 3,380 km (2,100 mi) in length depending on the measuring party and their methods. The Madeira is the biggest tributary of the Amazon, accounting for about 15% of the water in the basin. A map from Emanuel Bowen in 1747, held by the David Rumsey Map Collection, refers to the Madeira by the pre-colonial, indigenous name Cuyari.

The River of Cuyari, called by the Portuguese Madeira or the Wood River, is formed by two great rivers, which join near its mouth. It was by this River, that the Nation of Topinambes passed into the River Amazon.

== Climate ==
The mean inter-annual precipitations on the great basins vary from 75 to 300 cm (2.5–9.8 ft), the entire upper Madeira basin receiving 170.5 cm (5.6 ft). The greatest extremes of rainfall are between 49 and 700 cm (1.6–23 ft). Even just below the confluence that forms it, the Madeira is one of the largest rivers by discharge of the world, with a mean inter-annual discharge of 18,000 cubic metres per second (640,000 cu ft/s), i.e., 568 km^{3} (136 mi^{3}) per year, approximately half the discharge of the Congo River. On the further course towards the Amazon, the mean discharge of the Madeira increases up to 31,200 m^{3}/s (1,100,000 cu ft/s).

== Course ==
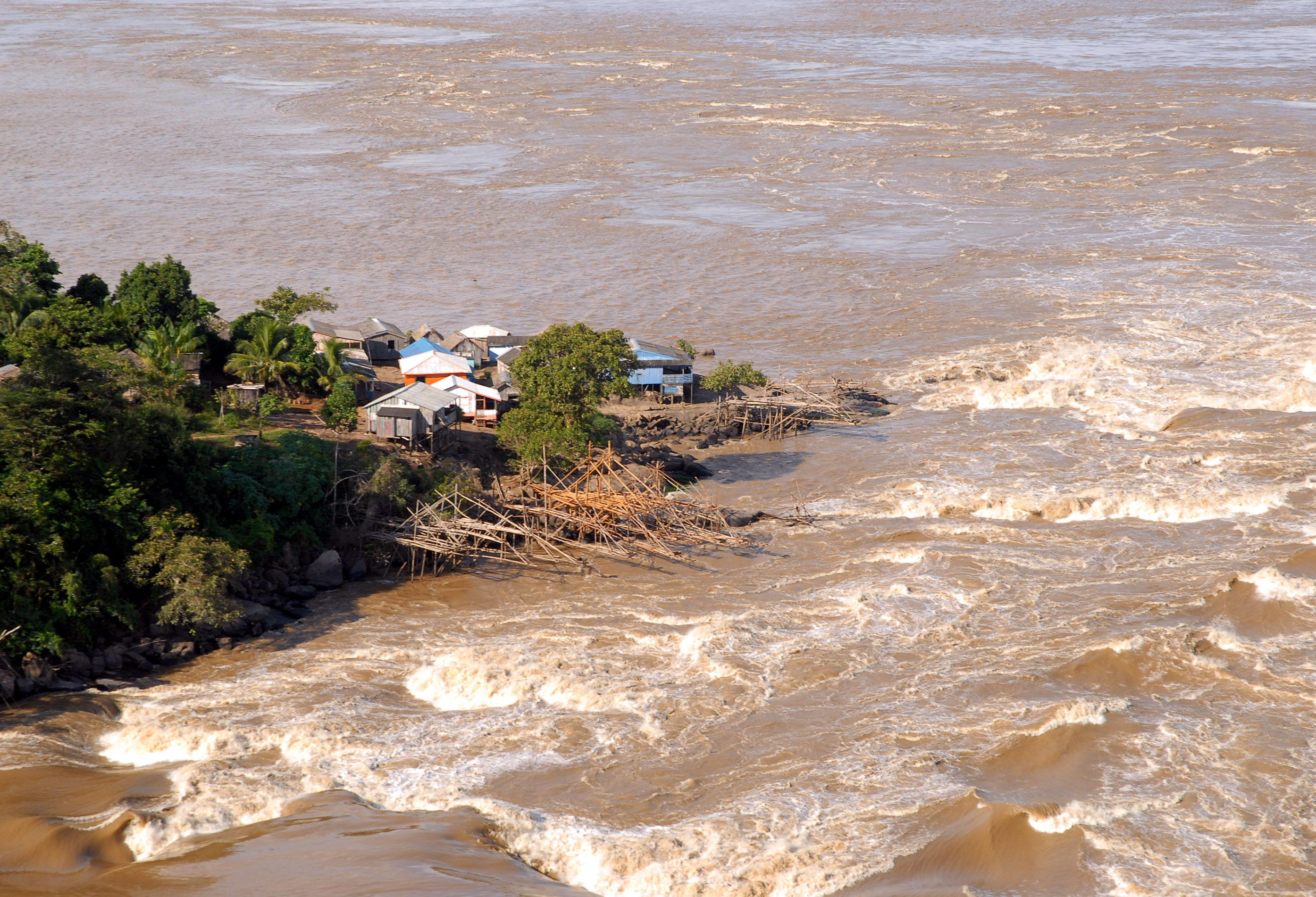
Rapids of Teotônio before 2012

Between Guajará-Mirim and the falls of Teotônio, the Madeira receives the drainage of the north-eastern slopes of the Andes from Santa Cruz de la Sierra to Cuzco, the whole of the south-western slope of Brazilian Mato Grosso and the northern slope of the Chiquitos sierras. In total, this catchment area, which is slightly more than the combined area of all headwaters, is 850,000 km^{2} (330,000 sq mi), almost equal in size to France and Spain combined. The waters flow into the Madeira from many large rivers, the principal of which, (from east to west), are the Guaporé or Iténez, the Baures and Blanco, the Itonamas or San Miguel, the Mamoré, Beni, and Madre de Dios or Mayutata, all of which are reinforced by numerous secondary but powerful affluents. The climate of the upper catchment area varies from humid in the western edge with the origin of the river's main stem by volume (Río Madre de Dios, Río Beni) to semi arid in the southernmost part with the Andine headwaters of the main stem by length (Río Caine, Río Rocha, Río Grande, Mamoré).

All of the upper branches of the river Madeira find their way to the falls across the open, almost level Mojos and Beni plains, 90,000 km^{2} (35,000 sq mi) of which are yearly flooded to an average depth of about one meter (3 ft) for a period of from three to four months.

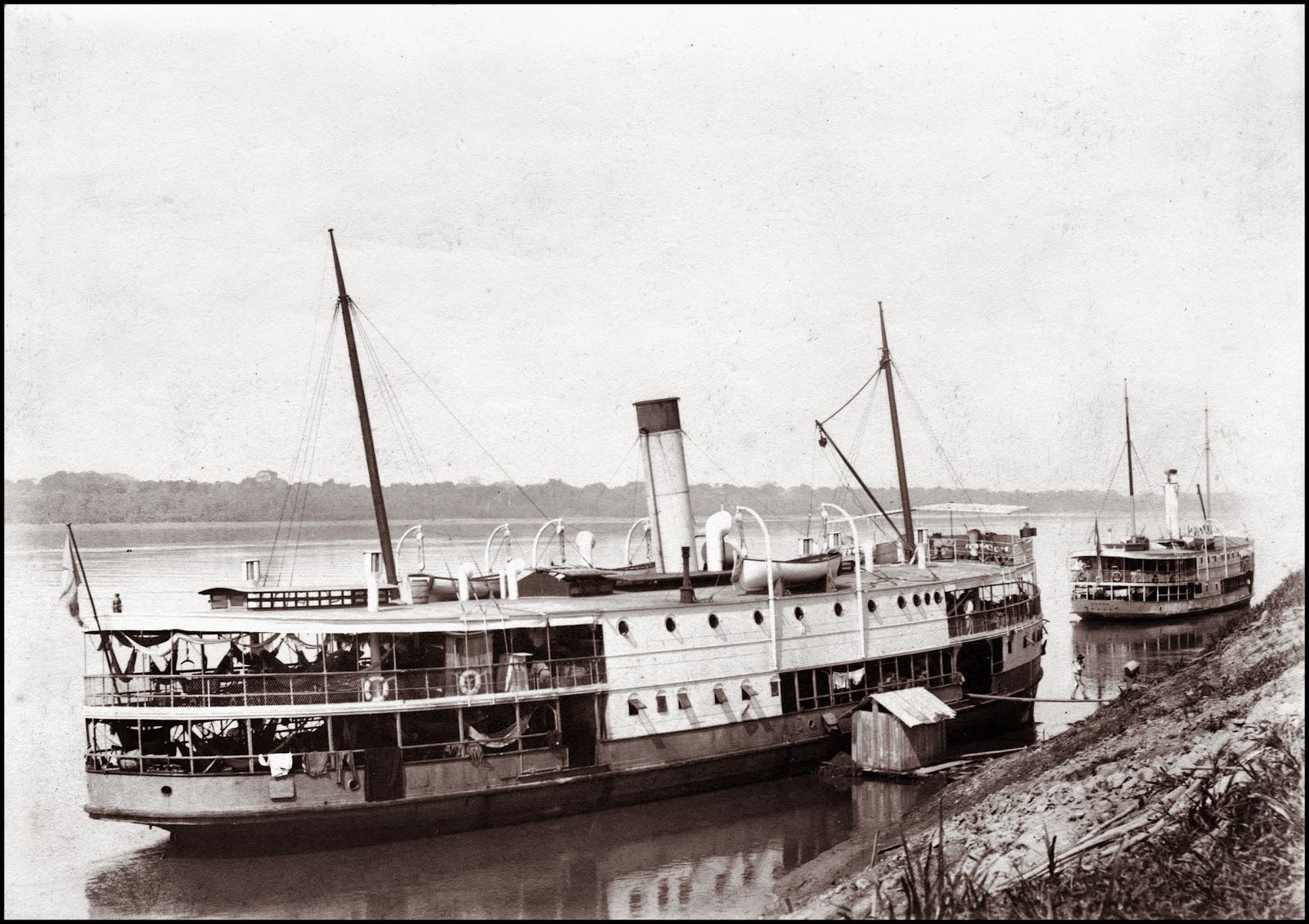
The steamships “Aymoré” and “Sucre” on the Madeira river.

From its source in the confluence of Madre de Dios and Mamoré rivers and downstream to Abuna River the Madeira flows northward forming border between Bolivia and Brazil. Below its confluence with the latter tributary the flow of river changes to north-eastward direction, inland of Rondônia state of Brazil. The section of the river from the border to Porto Velho has notable drop of bed and was not navigable. Before 2012 the falls of Teotônio and of San Antônio existed here, they had higher flow rate and bigger level drop than more famous Boyoma Falls in Africa. Currently these rapids are submerged by the reservoir of Santo Antônio Dam. Below Porto Velho the Madeira meanders north-eastward through the Rondônia and Amazonas states of north west Brazil to its junction with the Amazon.

The 283,117 hectares (2,800 km^{2}; 1,100 mi^{2}) Rio Madeira Sustainable Development Reserve, created in 2006, extends along the north bank of the river opposite the town of Novo Aripuanã. At its mouth is Ilha Tupinambaranas, an extensive marshy region formed by the Madeira's distributaries.

== Navigation ==
The Madeira river rises more than 15 m (50 ft) during the rainy season, and ocean vessels may ascend it to the falls of San Antonio, near Porto Velho, Brazil, 1,070 km (660 mi) above its mouth; but in the dry months, from June to November, it is only navigable for the same distance for craft drawing about 2 meters (7 ft) of water. The Madeira-Mamoré Railroad runs in a 365 km (227 mi) loop around the unnavigable section to Guajará-Mirim on the Mamoré River, but is not functional, limiting shipping from the Atlantic at Porto Velho.

Today, it is also one of the Amazon basin's most active waterways, and helps export close to four million tons of grains, which are loaded onto barges in Porto Velho, where both Cargill and Amaggi have loading facilities, and then shipped down the Madeira to the ports of Itacoatiara, near the mouth of the Madeira, just upstream on the left bank of the Amazon, or further down the Amazon, to the port of Santarem, at the mouth of the Tapajos River. From these two ports, Panamax-type ships then export the grains - mainly soy and corn - to Europe and Asia. The Madeira waterway is also used to take fuel from the REMAN refinery (Petrobras) in Manaus, state capital of Amazonas, to Porto Velho, from where the states of Acre, Rondônia and parts of Mato Grosso are supplied mainly with gasoline (petrol) refined in Manaus. Cargo barges also use the Madeira on the route between Manaus and Porto Velho, which is 1,225 km (760 mi) along the Rio Negro, Amazon and Madeira, connecting Manaus' industrial district with the rest of Brazil, as Manaus is land-locked as far as logistics with the rest of the country are concerned, to bring in part of its raw materials, and export its produce to the major consumer centres of São Paulo and Rio de Janeiro. In 2012, the cargo amounted to 287,835 tons (both directions). The total tonnage shipped in 2012 on the Madeira accounted to 5,076,014.

Two large dams (see below) are under construction as part of the IIRSA regional integration project. The dam projects include large ship-locks capable of moving oceangoing vessels between the impounded reservoir and the downstream river. If the project is completed, "more than 4,000 km [2,500 mi] of waterways upstream from the dams in Brazil, Bolivia, and Peru would become navigable."

== Ecology ==
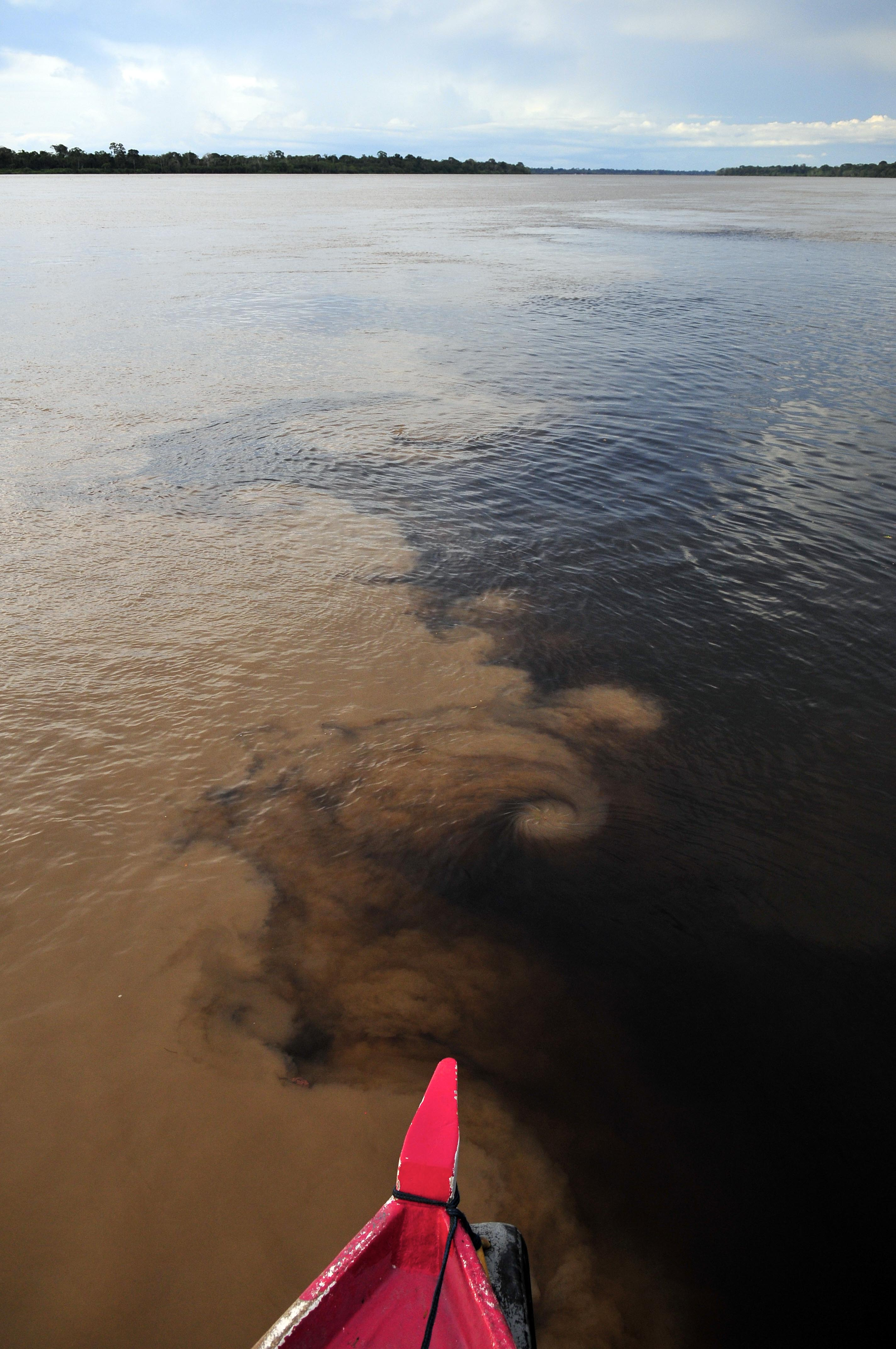
The confluence of the Madeira River (brown) and Aripuanã River (dark) near the town of Novo Aripuanã.

As typical of Amazonian rivers with the primary headwaters in the Andes, the Madeira River is turbid because of high sediment levels and it is whitewater, but some of its tributaries are clearwater (e.g., Aripuanã and Ji-Paraná) or blackwater (e.g., Manicoré).

The Bolivian river dolphin, variously considered a subspecies of the Amazon river dolphin or a separate species, is restricted to the upper Madeira River system. It has been estimated that there are more than 900 fish species in the Madeira River Basin, making it one of the freshwater systems in the world with the highest species richness.

== In popular culture ==
The river is the fifth title of the 1993/1999 Philip Glass album Aguas da Amazonia.

== Dams ==
In July 2007, plans have been approved by the Brazilian Government to construct two hydroelectric dams on the Madeira River, the Santo Antônio Dam near Porto Velho and the Jirau Dam about 100 km upstream. Both the Jirau and Santo Antonio dams are run-of-the-river projects that do not impound a large reservoir. Both dams also feature some environmental re-mediation efforts (such as fish ladders). As a consequence, it has been suggested that there has not been strong environmental opposition to the implementation of the Madeira river complex. Yet, if the fish ladders fail, "several valuable migratory fish species could suffer near-extinction as a result of the Madeira dams." There are also concerns with deforestation and pressure on conservation areas and indigenous peoples' territories. The Worldwatch institute has also criticized the fast-track approval process for "kindler, gentler dams with smaller reservoirs, designed to lessen social and environmental impacts", claiming that no project should "fast-track the licensing of new dams in Amazonia and allow projects to circumvent Brazil's tough environmental laws".

== Languages ==
Indigenous languages of the upper Madeira River basin (in Brazil, Bolivia, and Peru):

Note: † = extinct language

Classification	Language(s)	Location	No. of speakers
Arawakan	Mojeño (2 dialects): Ignaciano, Trinitario-†Loretano	Mojos de Beni (San Ignácio, Isiboro-Sécure, Trinidad)	2,000
Arawakan	Terena: Terena, †Chané, dialects influenced by Guaikuru	southern Mato Grosso and southern Santa Cruz	8,000 (?)
Arawakan	Paunaka	near Concepción (Santa Cruz)	4
Arawakan	Baure (3 dialects): Baure, †Muchojeone, †Paikoneka	savannas in northeastern Beni and forests in northern Santa Cruz	40
Arawakan	Parecí (3 dialects): Waimaré-Kaxiniti, Kozarini, Enawenê-Nawê	tributaries of the upper Juruena River and the upper Guaporé River (Mato Grosso)	800
Arawakan	†Sarave(ka)	Santa Cruz (border with Brazil)	0
Arawakan	Piro: Maniteneri, Iñapari	Pando and Piedras River (Peru)	300
Arawakan	†Lapaču / Apolista	Yungas de Apolo (La Paz)	0
Cariban	†Palmela	northeast of Beni, near the Guaporé River	0
Tupian	Tupi-Guarani (2 dialects): Guarayu, Kagwahib	from the San Pablo River (Ecuador) to the Paragúa River (Santa Cruz); Rondônia and Amazonas	6,000
Tupian	Sirionó, Yuki	between Trinidad and Santa Cruz	600
Tupian	Karitiana	east of Porto Velho	170
Tupian	Puruborá	São Miguel River (Rondônia)	2
Tupian	Mondé Suruí	Rondônia and Mato Grosso	700
Tupian	Mondé Gavião-Zoró, Cinta-Larga, Aruá, Salamãi	Rondônia and Mato Grosso	1,800
Tupian	Arara	Rondônia and Mato Grosso	150
Tupian	Makurap	east of Rondônia	50
Tupian	Tupari	Rondônia, coming from Mato Grosso	150
Tupian	Tsakirabiat, Akuntsu	east of Rondônia	30
Tupian	Wayoro	east of Rondônia	10
Tupian	†Kepkiriwat	east of Rondônia	0
Panoan	2 dialects: Pakawara / †Karipuna, Chácobo / †Pakaa-Nova	lower Beni River, Yata River and Abunã River	700
Panoan	†Atsawaka, Yamiaka	Madre de Dios River (Peru)	0
Panoan	Kaxarari	Abunã River (Rondônia and Amazonas)	100
Panoan	Yaminawa	Acre and Pando	500
Tacanan	Araona	Madre de Dios River and Manuripi River	81
Tacanan	Ese’ Ejja	Madidi River	500
Tacanan	Cavineña	Beni River and Madidi River	1,200
Tacanan	Takana	between the upper Beni River and Peru	1,800
Tacanan	Maropa	upper Beni River	5
Chapacuran	Wari’ / “Pacaa-Nova”	Pacaás Novos River (Rondônia)	1,300
Chapacuran	Itene (Moré, Kautário)	Cautário River (Rondônia) and Bolivia	20
Chapacuran	Oro Win	upper Pacaás Novos River	5
Chapacuran	†Wanyam (Miguelenho)	São Miguel River (Rondônia)	0
Chapacuran	†Tora, †Urupa	lower Machado River (Rondônia)	0
Chapacuran	†Chapacura proper, †Nãpeka	Rio Blanco (Santa Cruz)	0
Nambikwaran	Nambikwara, Northern	between the Cabixi River and Camararé River (Mato Grosso)	20
Nambikwaran	Nambikwara, Southern	between the upper Guaporé River and Juruena River (Mato Grosso)	700
Nambikwaran	Sabanê	near Vilhena (Mato Grosso)	3
Macro-Jê	Djeoromitxi	Rio Branco (Rondônia)	40
Macro-Jê	Arikapu (Mashubi)	Rio Branco (Rondônia)	2
Macro-Jê	Rikbaktsa (Canoeiro)	Juruena River (Mato Grosso)	1,000
Macro-Jê	Chiquitano	central Santa Cruz	6,000
Harakmbet-Katukina	Harakmbet (Amarakaeri, Wachipaeri)	Madre de Dios River (Peru)	650
isolate	Irantxe, Myky	Do Sangue River (Mato Grosso)	300
isolate	Aikanã (Masaka, Huari)	Corumbiara River and Apediá River (Rondônia)	170
isolate	Kanoê	Corumbiara River (Rondônia)	5
isolate	Kwaza (Koaiá)	Apediá River (Rondônia)	25
isolate	†Canichana	San Pedro (Mamoré River)	0
isolate	Cayuvava	Exaltación (Mamoré River)	3
isolate	†Itonama	northeast of Beni	0
isolate	Movima	Yacuma River (Beni)	1,500
isolate	Mosetén, Chimane	near San Borja (Beni)	6,000
isolate	Yuracare	from the Sécure River to the Ichilo River (Cochabamba)	3,000
isolate	Mura-Pirahã	middle Madeira River	300
isolate	†Matanawi	Castanha River / Roosevelt River	0
