= Languages of Bolivia =

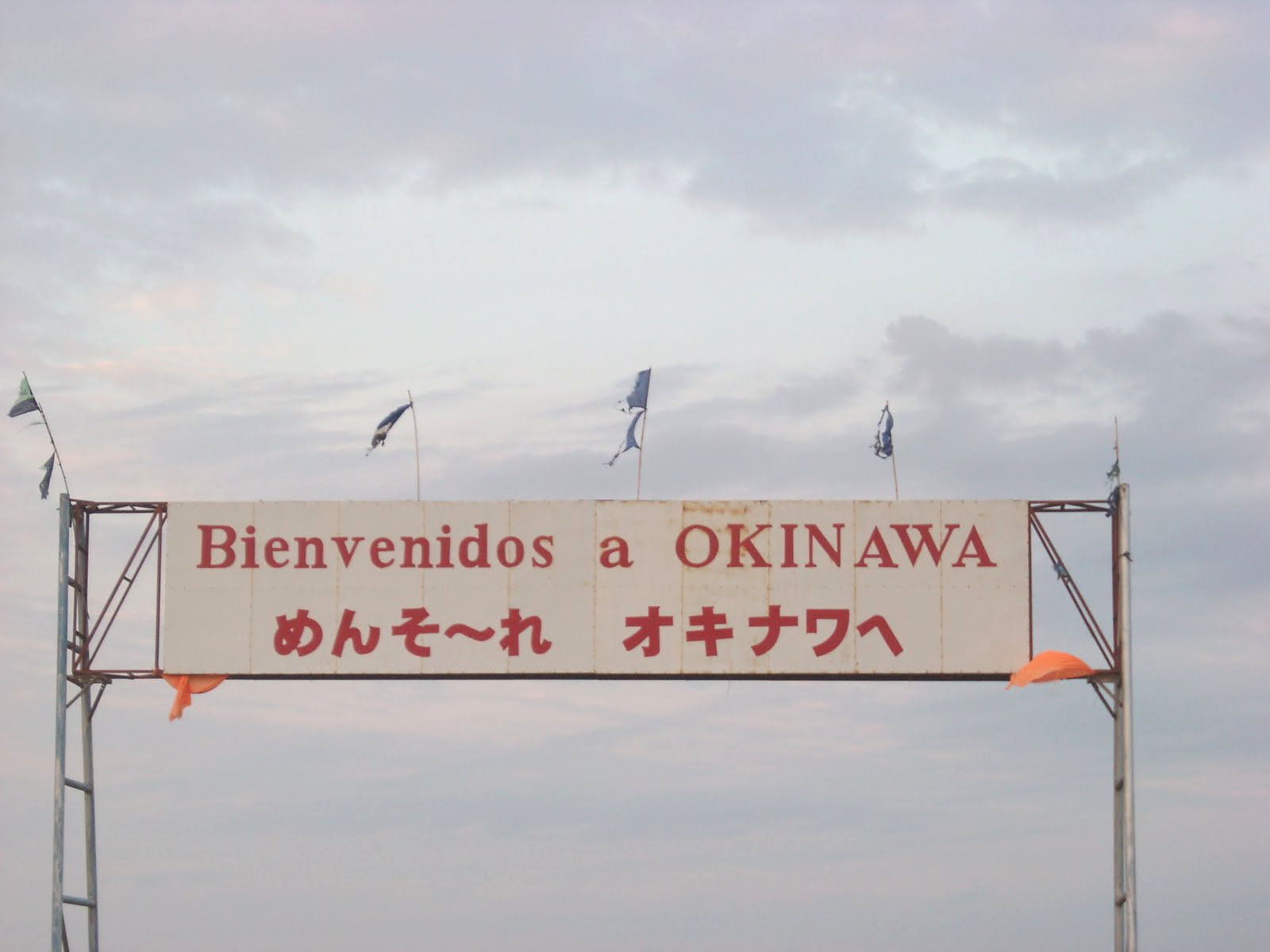
- Sign in Okinawa Uno (a colonia in Bolivia), in Spanish and Okinawan
- Official: 37 languages: Aymara; Araona; Baure; Bésiro; Canichana; Cavineño; Cayubaba; Chácobo; Chimán; Ese Ejja; Guaraní; Guarasu'we; Guarayu; Itonama; Leco; Machajuyai-Kallawaya; Machineri; Maropa; Mojeño-Ignaciano; Mojeño-Trinitario; Moré; Mosetén; Movima; Pacawara; Puquina; Quechua; Sirionó; Spanish; Tacana; Tapieté; Toromona; Uru-Chipaya; Weenhayek; Yaminawa; Yuki; Yuracaré; Zamuco
- Main: Spanish
- Indigenous: Arawakan languages, Pano-Tacanan languages, Quechuan languages, Tupian languages, others
- Vernacular: Bolivian Spanish, Portuñol
- Minority: Standard German, Plautdietsch
- Foreign: English
- Signed: Bolivian Sign Language
- Keyboard layout: Spanish Latinamerican QWERTY

The languages of Bolivia include Spanish and several dozen indigenous languages, most prominently Aymara, Quechua, Chiquitano, Guaraní and the Bolivian Sign Language (closely related to the American Sign Language). Indigenous languages and Spanish are official languages of the state according to the 2009 Constitution. The constitution says that all indigenous languages are official, listing 36 specific indigenous languages, of which some are extinct. Spanish and Quechua are spoken primarily in the Andes region, Aymara is mainly spoken in the Altiplano around Lake Titicaca, Chiquitano is spoken in the central part of Santa Cruz department, and Guarani is spoken in the southeast on the border with Paraguay and Argentina.

== List of official languages ==
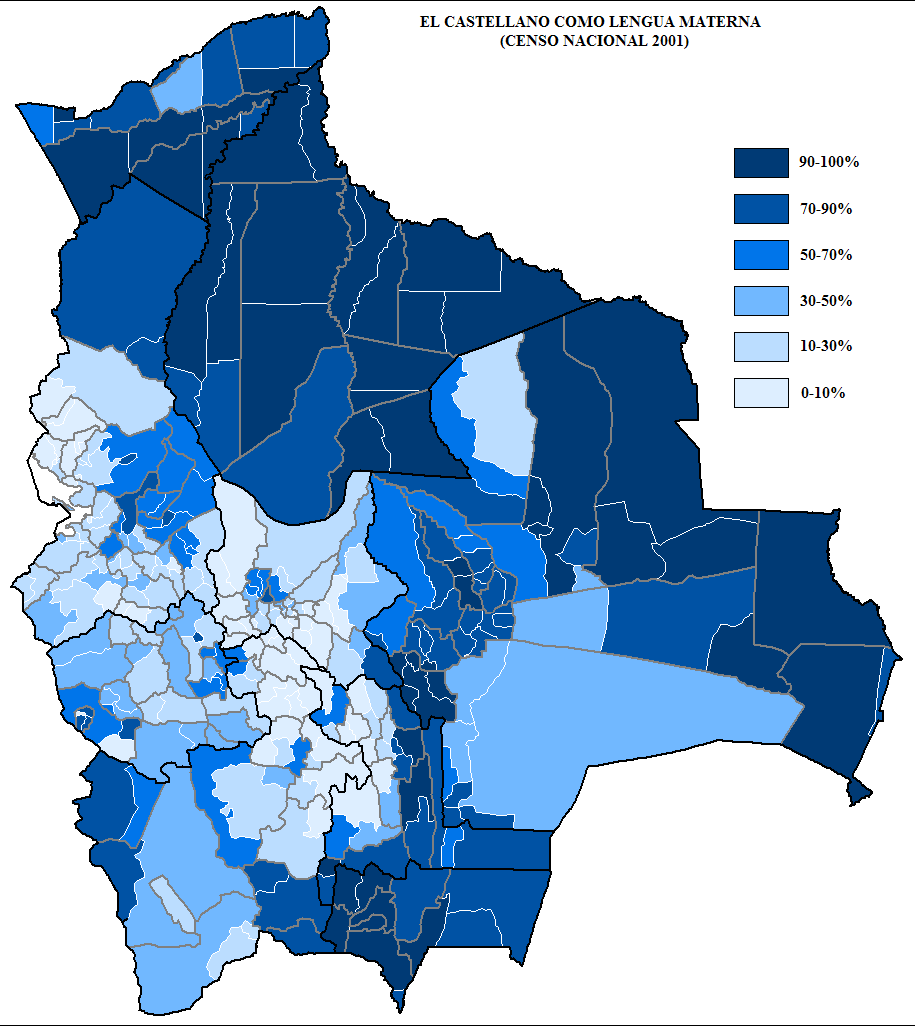
Native Spanish speakers: 44.89%.

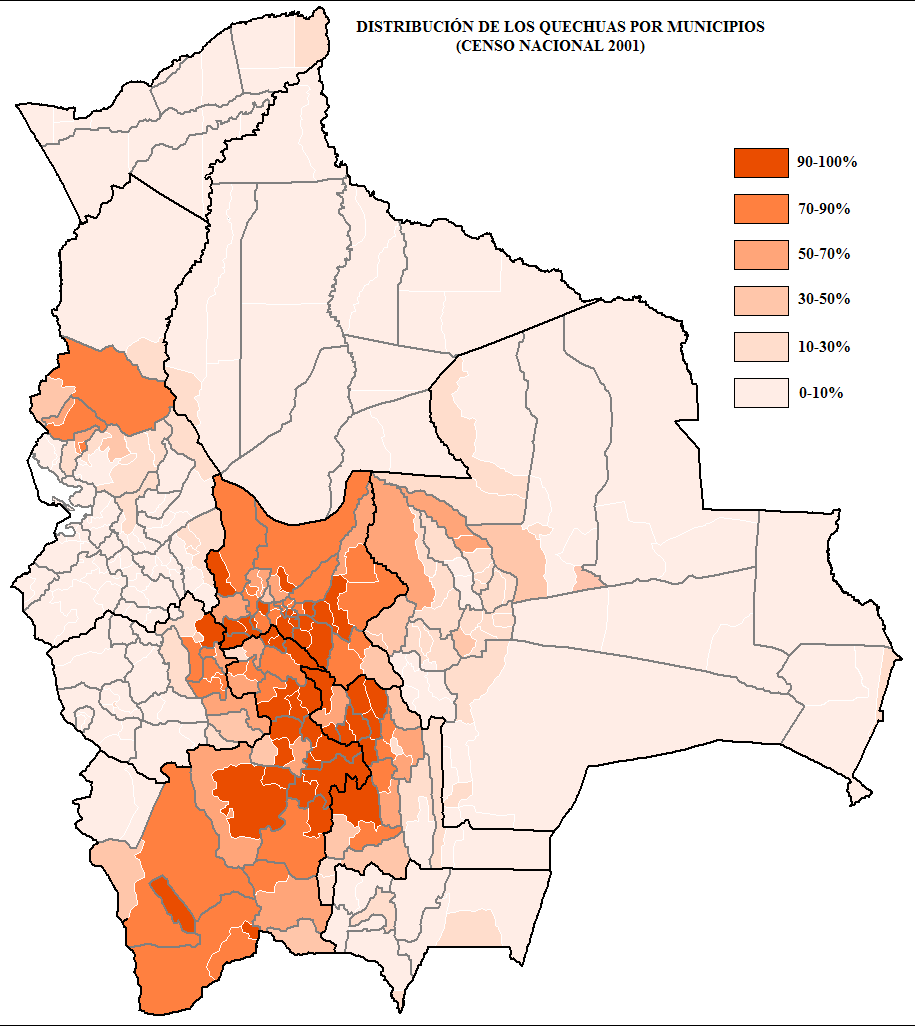
Native Quechua speakers: 25.08%.

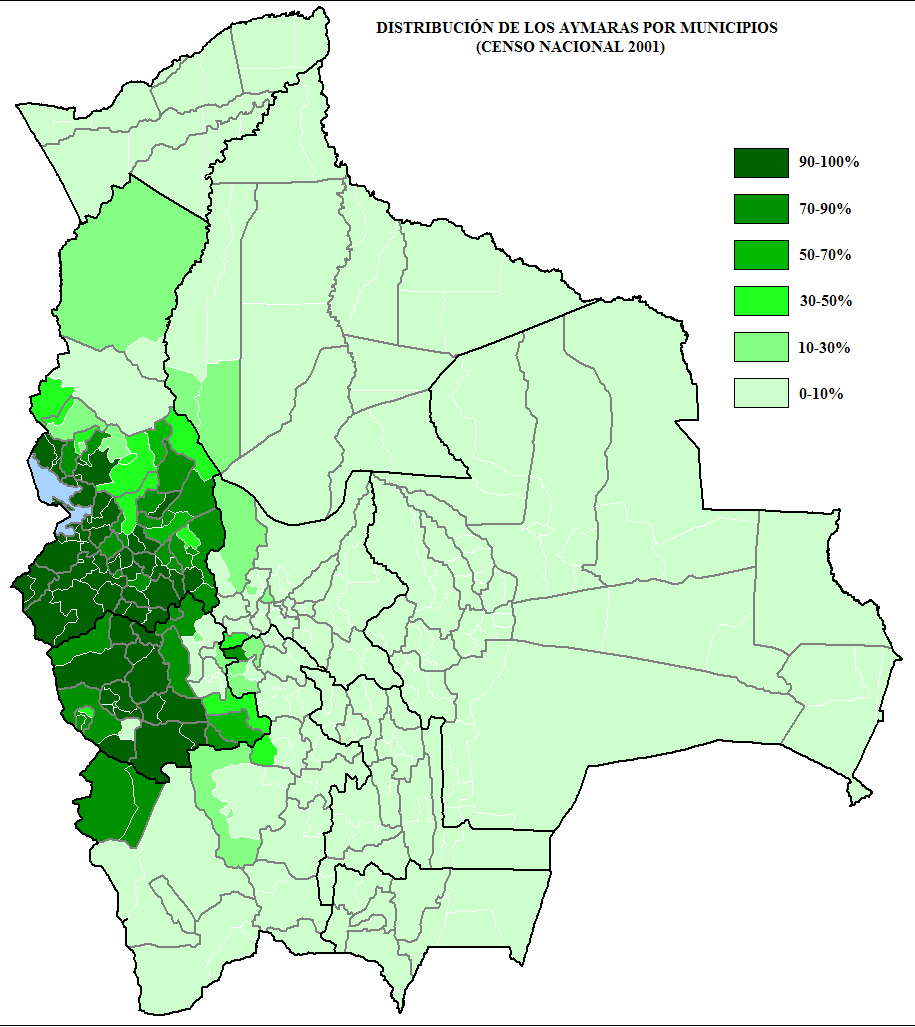
Native Aymara speakers: 16.77%.

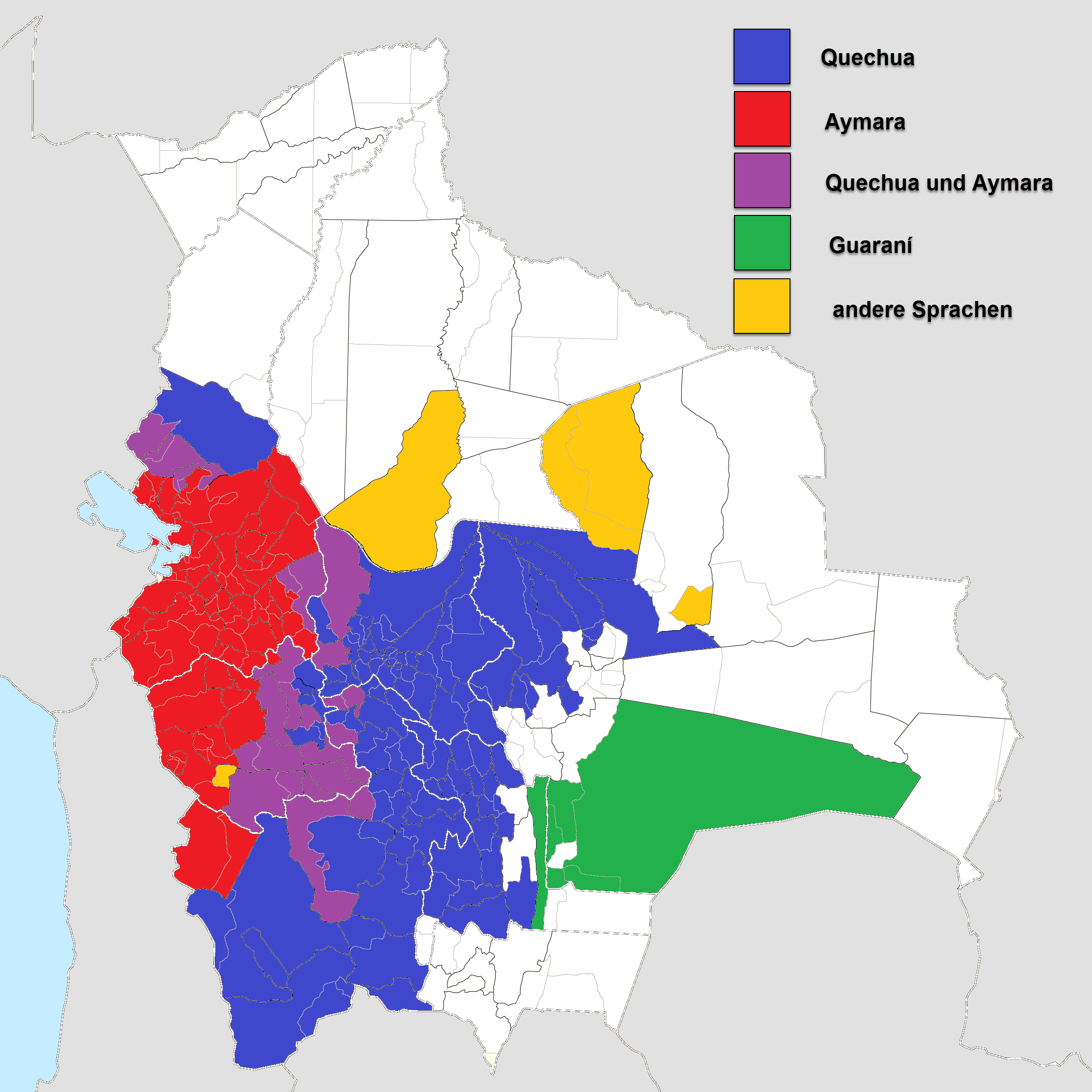
Prevalent indigenous language by municipality. Only languages >20% displayed. Based on 2001 census.

The following languages are listed as official languages in the Constitution of Bolivia.

- Castilian (Spanish)
- Araona
- Aymara
- Baure
- Bésiro
- Canichana
- Cavineño
- Cayubaba
- Chácobo
- Chimán
- Ese Ejja
- Guaraní
- Guarasu'we
- Guarayu
- Itonama
- Leco
- Machajuyai-Kallawaya
- Machineri
- Maropa
- Mojeño-Ignaciano
- Mojeño-Trinitario
- Moré
- Mosetén
- Movima
- Pacawara
- Puquina
- Quechua
- Sirionó
- Tacana
- Tapieté
- Toromona
- Uru-Chipaya
- Weenhayek
- Yaminawa
- Yuki
- Yuracaré
- Zamuco

In 2019, the Bolivian government and the Plurinational Institute for the Study of Languages and Cultures (Ipelec) announced plans to extend constitutional recognition to three additional indigenous languages.

- Joaquiniano
- Kumsa
- Paunaka

== Official status ==
The Bolivian government and the departmental governments are required to use at least two languages in their operation, one being Spanish, and the other being selected according to the circumstances and the needs of the territory in question. These requirements appear in Article 234 of the 2009 Constitution and the General Law of Linguistic Rights and Policies (Law 269 of August 2, 2012); the law provided a three-year deadline to government functionaries, although there was no immediate punishment for officials who failed to comply. Departmental and municipal autonomous governments are required to use the languages of their territory, always including Spanish.

Following the National Education Reform of 1994, all thirty indigenous languages were introduced alongside Spanish in the country's schools. However, many schools did not implement the reforms, especially urban schools.

Bolivia's national anthem has been translated into six indigenous languages: Aymara, Bésiro-Chiquitano, Guaraní, Guarayu, Quechua, and Mojeño-Trinitario.

Bolivia has 12 million inhabitants. Only 5 languages of Bolivia are spoken by more than 30,000 people: Spanish monolingual (5 million speakers), Kichwa (2.4 million speakers), Aymara (1.5 million), Low German (Plattdeutsch) (100,000 speakers) and Guaraní (33,000 speakers). Of these all are official except Plattdeutsch. There are 8 official languages spoken by between 1,000 and 8,000 people each. So of the 37 languages declared official by the constitution of 2009, 23 are spoken by fewer than 1,000 people and 2 are extinct (puquina and machajuyai-kallawaya).

== Languages without official status ==
Standard German is spoken by 160,000 of whom about 70,000 are Mennonites in Santa Cruz Department. These Mennonites speak Plautdietsch, a dialect of the Low German language, as everyday language but use Standard German for reading and writing and as formal language e.g. in church. Portuguese is also spoken near Bolivia's border with Brazil and around 0.2% of Bolivia speaks it as their mother tongue.

== See also ==
- Indigenous peoples in Bolivia
- Spanish language
- Quechua language
- Aymara language
- Guarani language
