= Toromona =

Indigenous people of Bolivia

Total population
- 200 (2000)

Regions with significant populations
- Bolivia

Languages
- Toromona

Religion
- traditional tribal religion

The Toromona are an indigenous people of Bolivia. They are an uncontacted people living near the upper Madidi and Heath Rivers in northwestern Bolivia. Bolivia's Administrative Resolution 48/2006, issued on 15 August 2006, created an "exclusive, reserved, and inviolable" portion of the Madidi National Park to protect the Toromona.

== Language ==
The Toromona language is a Tacanan language.

== History ==
No non-natives have contacted this tribe. During the Spanish colonization, settlers found it difficult to adapt to the area of the Amazon Basin. Besides surviving, their main goal was to find a secret place called Paititi, an alleged hiding place of the Incas' most valuable treasures which had been sequestered away from the Spaniards. There are some historical records confirming that the Incas, in fact, sealed storage tunnels in ritual ceremonies. Father Miguel Cabello de Balboa wrote about a city of gold, describing Paititi as a place supposedly protected by warrior women; he also mentioned the Toromona tribe, alleging that they possessed no qualms or reservations with regards to the executing of outsiders.

Norwegian biologist Lars Hafskjold had searched exhaustively for the Toromona, and became quite famous due to his disappearance, somewhere in the region of the Madidi park in 1997.

The Toromona have occasionally been seen by other indigenous peoples in the region. In the 21st century, anthropologist Michael Brohan was informed by members of the Araona people that they had contacted a group in voluntary isolation on the eastern bank of the Manuripi River, who were speakers of either Toromona or a nearly unintelligible dialect of Araona.
