= Cavineño people =

Cavineño
- Two women carrying firewood. Photo by Erland Nordenskiöld 1913-1914.

Total population
- 3884 (2012) in Bolivia

Languages
- Cavineña language, Spanish

Religion
- Roman Catholicism (often syncretic with indigenous beliefs)

Related ethnic groups
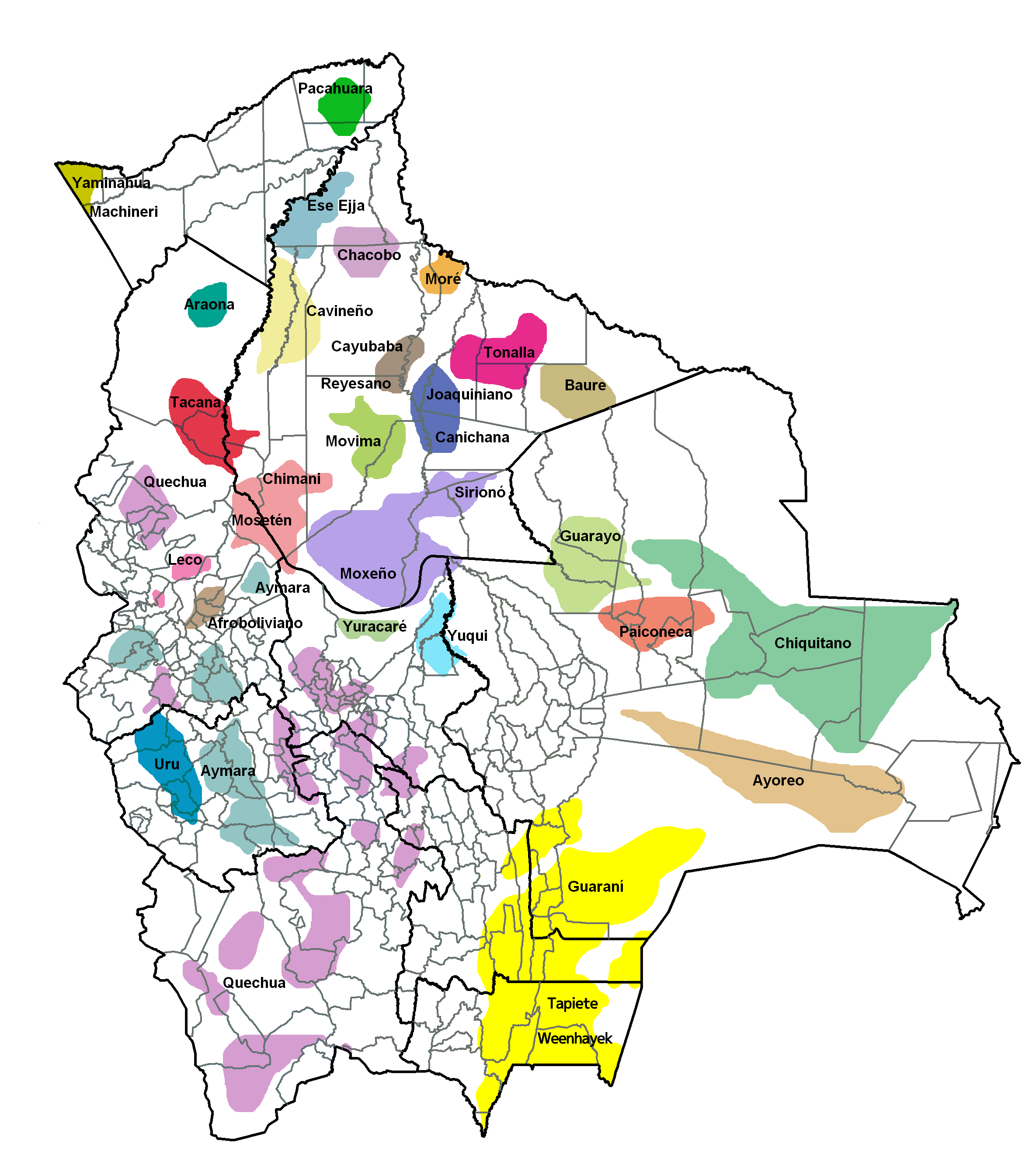
- Araona, Tacana, Ese Ejja

The Cavineño people (also Cavina, Cavineña, Cavinenyo, Cavinya, Kaviña) are an ethnic group in Bolivia. They mainly live along the Beni and Madidi rivers. There were 3,884 of them in 2012, of whom 1,173 speak the Cavineña language natively. Almost all of them speak Spanish as well. According to Alfred Métraux, the Cavineño and the Araona people are so intermixed with other Takanan-speaking peoples that it can be difficult to treat them separately.

== History ==
They were moved by the end of the 18th century from the Madre de Dios River to the Madidi River. During the rubber fever, from the end of the 19th century, they were, just like many other indigenous peoples in the area, subjected to conditions of semi-slavery. They were later settled at a missionary station at the Beni River. In 1832 there were about 1,000 Cavineño, but only 153 in 1886. Erland Nordenskiöld describes 218 Cavineño in 1913 at the Jesus de Cavina mission. They were said to speak a Takanan dialect.

== Current status ==
Today the Cavineños are grouped into six small communities located in the municipalities of Riberalta and Reyes in Beni and also in Pando. Its largest community is called Puerto Cavinas. They own territories in collective properties that they share with the Tacanas in Beni and with the Ese Ejja and Tacanas in Pando.
