= Ese Ejja =

Ese Ejja or Tiatinagua may refer to:

- Ese Ejja people, an indigenous group of Bolivia and Peru
- Ese Ejja language, a language of Bolivia and Peru
