= Edwin R. Heath =

American physician and explorer

Edwin Ruthven Heath
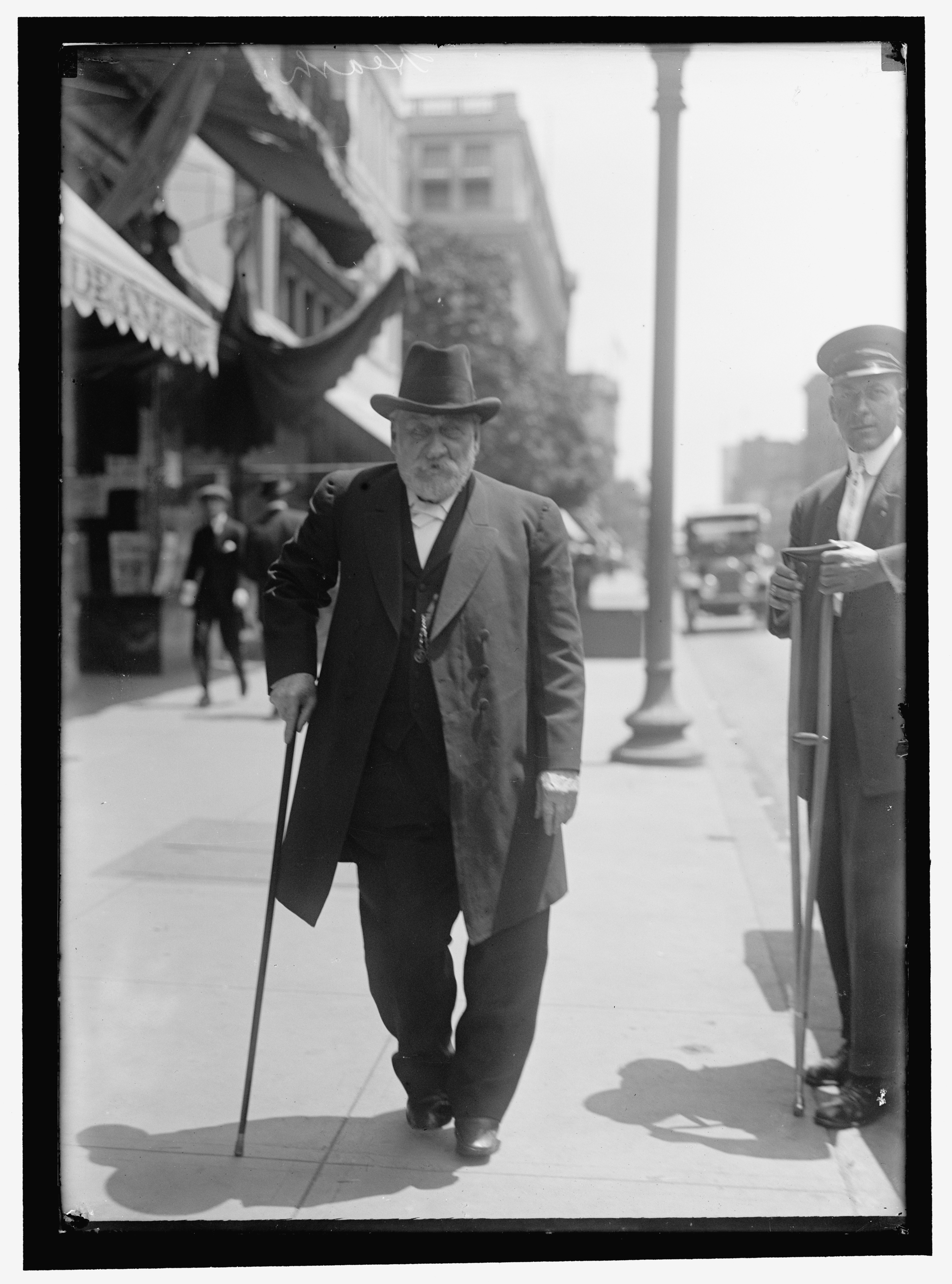
- Edwin Heath in 1916
- Born: July 12, 1839; Janesville, Wisconsin, U.S.
- Died: October 27, 1932 (aged 93); Kansas City, Missouri, U.S.
- Resting place: Elmwood Cemetery
- Education: Beloit College
- Occupations: Physician; Explorer
- Known for: Mapping the rivers of the Madre de Dios region (Beni River)
- Relatives: James Heath (father); Madelia Heath (mother)
- Awards: Honorary Member of the Royal Geographical Society (1883)

Edwin Ruthven Heath (12 July 1839–27 October1932) was an American physician and explorer. He is best known for his exploration and mapping of the rivers of the Madre de Dios region in Peru and Bolivia. The Heath River on the Peru/Bolivia border and Puerto Heath, Bolivia bear his name.

== Early life ==
Edwin Heath was born on July 12, 1839, in Janesville, Wisconsin. His parents, James and Madelia Heath, had come from Vermont. As a young boy he traveled with his parents to Sacramento, California during the California Gold Rush. His father was a doctor who attended cholera victims during the 1850 epidemic. Edwin became an orphan when his father died of that disease in 1850, and his mother died in 1851. He returned to Wisconsin in 1853 via Nicaragua, and was said to have protected himself on the journey with two six-shooters and a Bowie knife.

== Education and early career ==
With the help of his guardian, J.F. Willard, Heath attended Beloit College, graduating in 1861. He then studied homeopathic medicine in New York and had a practice in Palmyra, New York, until 1866. In 1866 he moved to Wyandotte, Kansas and worked with cholera patients in the railroad camps of Ellsworth.

== Work in South America ==
=== Chile ===
Heath met physician and politician Joseph Pomeroy Root in Kansas. When Root went to South America in 1869 as American Minister to Chile, Heath accompanied him as secretary of the delegation. In Chile he met railway builder Henry Meiggs, who appointed Heath to supervise the construction of the Pacasmayo Railway. Heath returned to the United States in 1878, following Meiggs’ death and the takeover of the railway by the government of Chile.

=== Peru and Bolivia ===
Professor James Orton of Vassar College undertook to explore the length of the Beni River in 1876, but was unsuccessful; he died while on the exploration. Heath decided to complete that journey, and began to travel up the Amazon via canoe in 1879. After 1500 miles he encountered a railway camp filled with workers ill with yellow fever. He remained there for seven months, working as a physician. Then, on reaching Reyes, Bolivia, he spent a year planning the Beni expedition. During that time he sent herpetological samples back to the U.S.; a snake (Heath's Tropical Racer) is named for him. Heath mapped the entire 1200 mile length of the Beni, traveling by canoe accompanied by two local guides.

== Later years ==
Heath returned to Kansas in 1882, working as a doctor in Wyandotte and then in Kansas City. He was named an Honorary Member of the Royal Geographical Society in 1883, and also was active in the American Geographical Society and the National Geographic Society. He participated in the 1916 talks of the League to Enforce Peace, and served as Kansas City Counsel for Nicaragua, Guatemala and Bolivia.

He died in Kansas City, Missouri, on October 27, 1932, at the age of 93, and is buried in Elmwood Cemetery.
