= Mabenaro language =

Tacanan language of Peru

Mabenaro
- Native to: Peru
- Region: Department of Madre de Dios
- Ethnicity: Mabenaro
- Extinct: after 1922
- Language family: Pano–Tacanan: Tacanan; (unclassified); Mabenaro

Language codes
- ISO 639-3: None (mis)
- Glottolog: mabe1235

Mabenaro is a Tacanan language once spoken along the Madre de Dios River of Peru. It is known only from a list of 54 words which are not very well transcribed. The vocabulary was described as similar to Tiatinagua.

== Vocabulary ==
=== Kinship terms ===
Mabenaro kinship terms
Mabenaro	Gloss
dia	man
wani	woman
tata	father
wanti	mother
dodo	brother
doda	sister
deanawa	son
ipona	daughter
nana	infant
kaʼabo	boy
iyaro	girl
