= Puerto Heath Airport =

Airport in Bolivia

- IATA: none; ICAO: SLKH

Summary
- Airport type: Public
- Serves: Puerto Heath, Bolivia
- Elevation AMSL: 590 ft / 180 m
- Coordinates: 12°30′15″S 68°39′00″W

Map
- Location of the airport in Bolivia

Runways
Direction	Length		Surface
Direction	m	ft	Surface
03/21	530	1,739	Grass
- Sources: GCM Google Maps

Puerto Heath Airport (ICAO: SLKH) is an airport serving the river village of Puerto Heath (es) in the La Paz Department of Bolivia.

The village is on the Madre de Dios River at its confluence with the Heath River, which is locally the border between Bolivia and Peru.

== See also ==
- Transport in Bolivia
- List of airports in Bolivia
