= Araona people =

Ethnic group in Bolivia

The Araona people are an ethnic group in Bolivia. Their population was 228 according to the 2012 census. Their language is the Araona language which is spoken by 711 people although many speak Spanish as well. The Araonans live in the headwaters of the Manupari river in northwest Bolivia. According to Alfred Métraux the Araona people and the Cavineño people are so intermixed with other Takanan-speaking peoples that it can be difficult to treat them separately.

== History ==
The first written historical mention of the Araona people comes from the Franciscan missionaries Manuel Mancini and Fidel Codenach in January 1867. They were however unable to found any place for their mission in this area of the La Paz department. There were too many difficulties and risks presented. The Araona were the most populous ethnic group in the region at the time. At the end of the 19th century the Araona were one of many indigenous groups who were displaced from their villages and used as slaves for the rubber industry. Between the Manorimi and Monopare Rivers the surviving Araona established themselves in various settlements. In 1965, Protestant Evangelical activists and missionaries from the SIL International created a permanent settlement and cooperated with the Araona communities to establish links with other indigenous groups.
