= Maropa people =

Ethnic group in Bolivia

The Maropa people are an ethnic group in Bolivia. There were 4,505 of them in 2012 of whom 57 speak the Maropa language natively.
