= Baure people =

Indigenous group of South America of Arawak origin

- Baure people photographed in 1909 by Erland Nordenskiöld

Total population
- 3328 (2010 census)

Languages
- Spanish, Baure

The Baure people are an ethnic group who live in the Beni Department of Bolivia. There were 3,328 of them according to the 2012 census of which 58 spoke the Baure language natively.
