= Ese Ejja people =

Indigenous people of Bolivia and Peru, in the southwestern Amazon basin

Ese Ejja
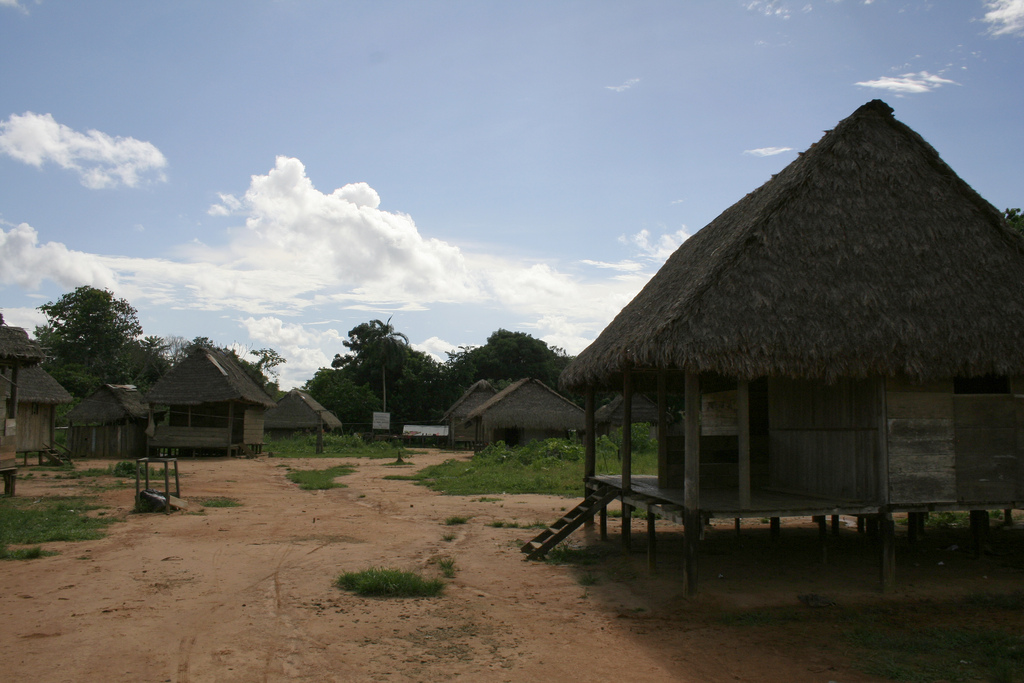
- Ese Ejja Village. Tambopata Rezerve, Peru

Total population
- 2,100

Regions with significant populations
- Bolivia (1,687), Peru (400-500)

Languages
- Ese Ejja • Spanish

Religion
- Christianity • Traditional Tribal Religion

The Ese Ejja are an indigenous people of Bolivia and Peru, in the southwestern Amazon basin. 1,687 Ese Ejja live in Bolivia, in the Pando and Beni Departments, in the foothills along the Beni and the Madre de Dios Rivers. In Peru, they live along the Tambopata and Heath Rivers, near Puerto Maldonado.

== Name ==
Their name derives from their autonym, Ece'je, which means "people." They are also known as the Chama, Ese Eja, Ese Exa, Ese’ejja, Huarayo, Tambopata-Guarayo, or Tiatinagua people.

== Language ==
The Ese Ejja language is a Tacanan language, spoken by all ages, and written in the Latin script. A dictionary has been produced for the language.

== Subsistence ==
Ese Ejja people are traditionally hunter-gatherers, farmers, rangers, and fishermen.
