= Toromona language =

Endangered Tacanan language of Bolivia

Toromona
- Toromono
- Native to: Bolivia
- Ethnicity: 200 Toromona (2000)
- Native speakers: (200 cited 1983)
- Language family: Tacanan: Araona–Tacanan; Cavinena–Tacana; Tacana Proper; Toromona

Official status
- Official language in: Bolivia

Language codes
- ISO 639-3: tno
- Glottolog: toro1255
- ELP: Toromona

Toromona (Toromono) is a Western Tacanan language which is severely endangered or possibly extinct. 200 Toromono were reported in 1983, but they have not been located since. It is poorly attested, but is recorded in wordlists.
