= Heath River =

River in Bolivia and Peru

Coordinates: 12.8333°S 68.8361°W

The Heath River, which runs from the Andes surrounding Lake Titicaca northwards to the Madre de Dios River, marks the natural border between Peru and Bolivia.

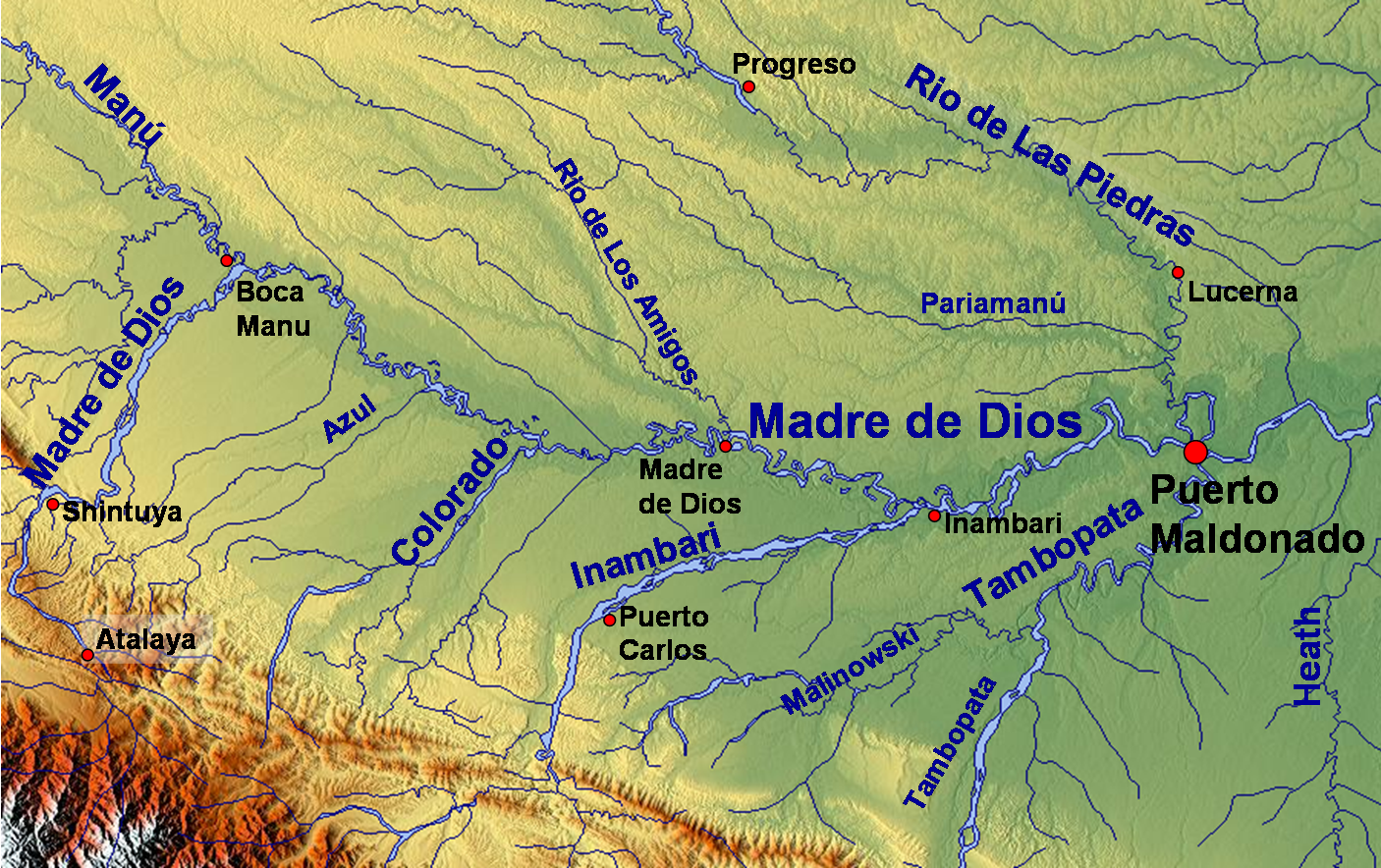
Rivers of the Madre de Dios Region, Peru and Bolivia

The Eja Sonene indigenous community lives in the area. They are an ethnic group belonging to either the Tacana-speaking Arawak, who migrated from the west or those of Pano origin, who originate from the lower reaches of the Madeira River.

Named for the American explorer Dr Edwin R. Heath in the 1880s, the river borders lowland savannah and rainforest. An early expedition to explore the Heath River basin was led by the British explorer Colonel Percy Harrison Fawcett in 1910.
