= Río Blanco (Bolivia) =

River in Bolivia

Coordinates: 15.9011°S 62.2558°W

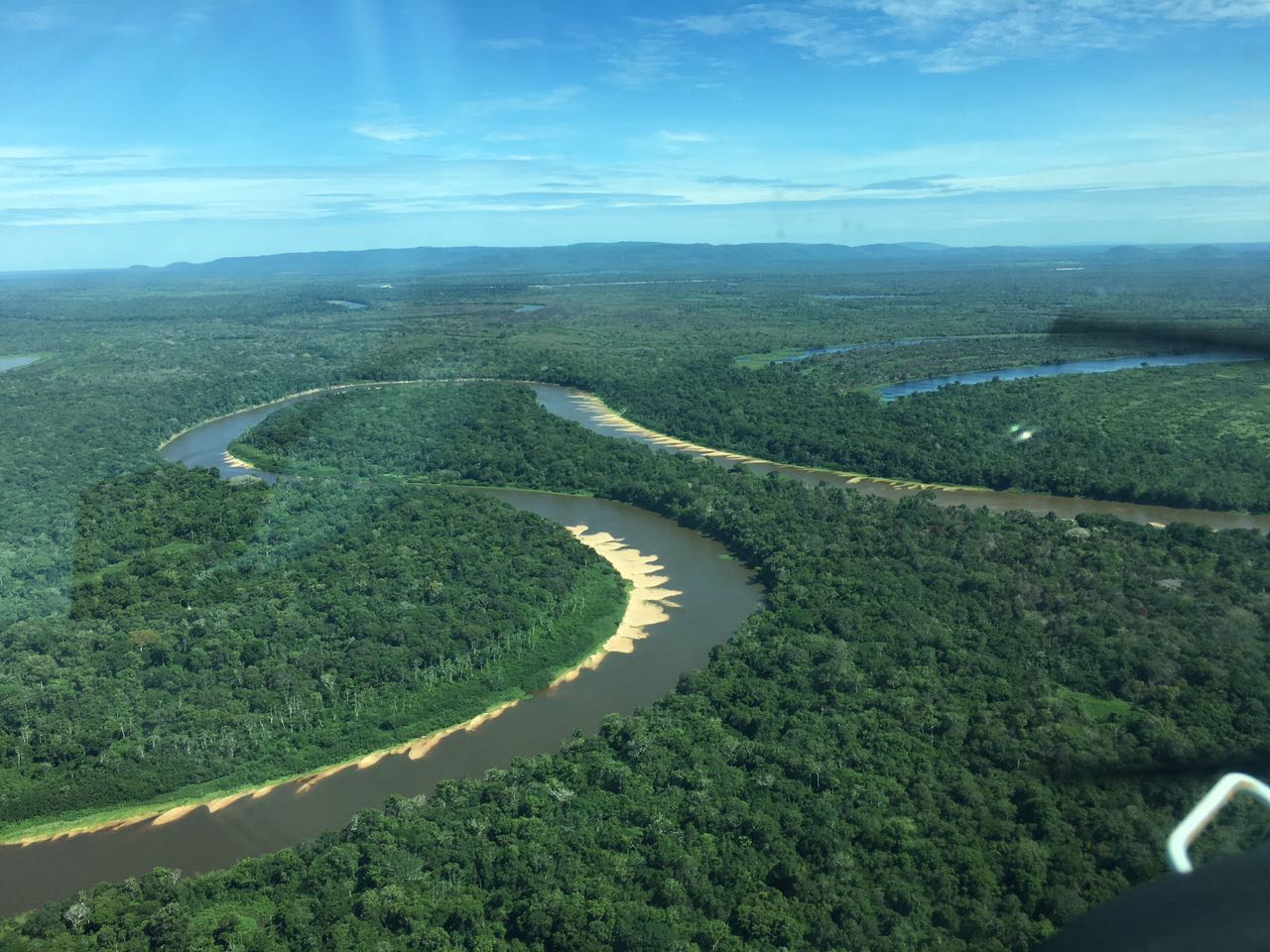

Location
- Country: Bolivia

Physical characteristics
- Mouth: Baures River
- Length: 350 km (220 mi)

Ramsar Wetland
- Official name: Río Blanco
- Designated: 2 February 2013
- Reference no.: 2092

The Río Blanco (Bolivia) is a river of Bolivia.

== See also ==
- List of rivers of Bolivia
