= Tacana people =

Ethnic group in Beni department, Bolivia

Tacana
Total population
- 18,535 (2012)

Regions with significant populations
- Beni Department, Bolivia

Languages
- Tacana language

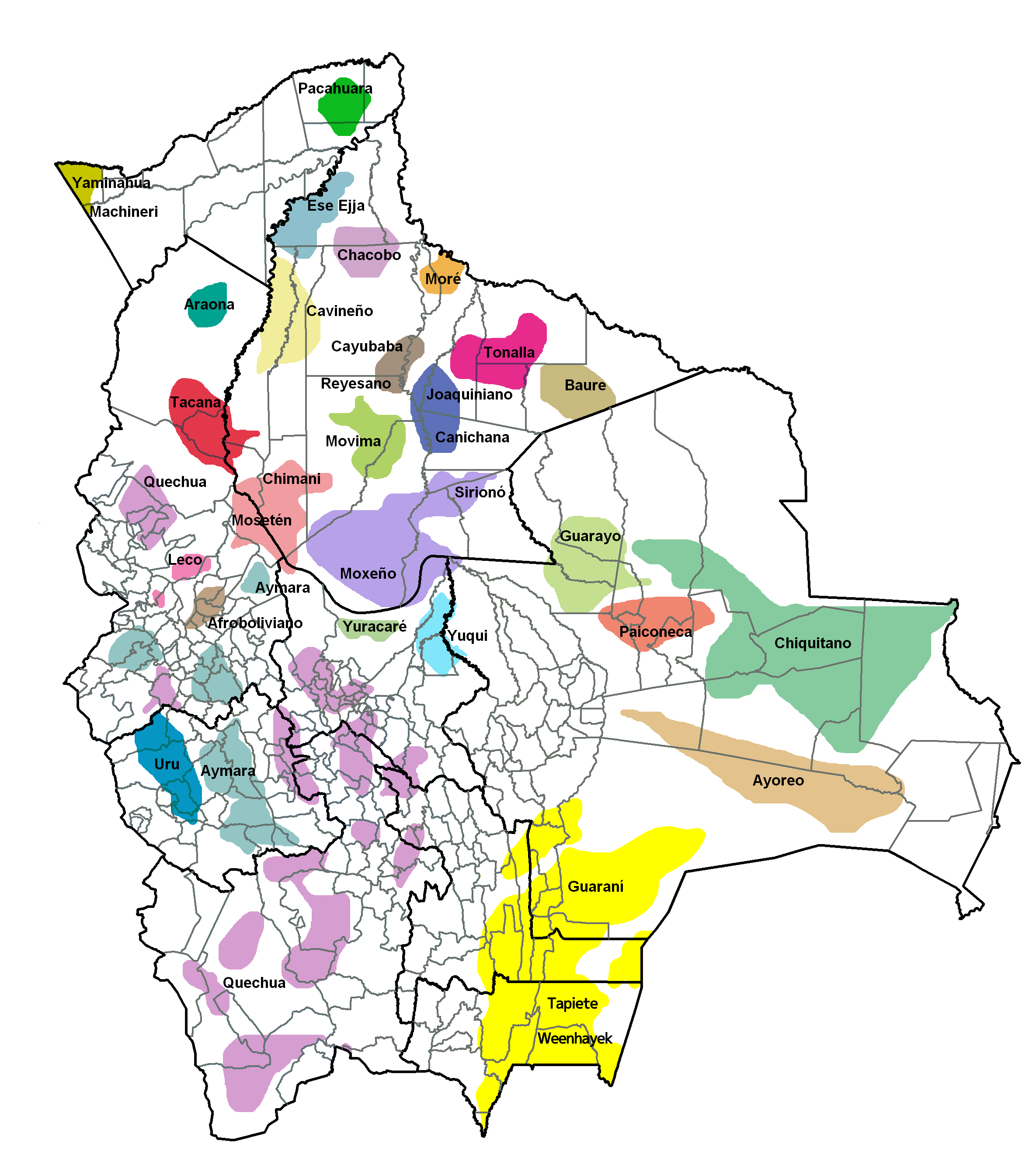
Indigenous peoples of Bolivia. Tacana is in red in the upper left.

The Tacana people are an ethnic group who live in the Beni department of Bolivia. There were 18,535 of them in 2012, of whom 559 speak the Tacana language natively.

== Background and social organization ==
During the process of Inca expansion towards the lowlands, they came into contact with the Tacanas in the region of the Beni River, establishing relations with them. Around 1680, the Franciscans entered the region, and it was only after 1731 that they began founding a series of missions, managing to reduce the tacanas. During much of the 19th century and the beginning of the 20th century, the Tacanas experienced significant mobilizations, due to the exploitation of cinchona (a medicinal tree) and rubber.

Descent and inheritance are governed patrilineally; the residence can be with one or the other of the in-laws or in an independent house, thus forming a western-style nuclear family.

== Political organization ==
The sociopolitical organization of the Tacana still preserves, although in a refunctionalized way, the system of political authorities that the Franciscans implemented: mayor, chieftain, policeman, etc. The Tacana of the Iturralde Province (La Paz) have created the Indigenous Council of the Tacana People (CIPTA), affiliated to the Central of Indigenous Peoples of La Paz (CEPILAP), which in turn is organically linked with the CIDOB. Some Tacana communities in the Northern Amazon (Pando and Beni), in turn, have formed the Tacana Indigenous Organization (OITA), affiliated to CIRABO and, therefore, to CIDOB. Other Tacanas de Pando communities have created the CIPOAP.

== Economic organization ==
Its economic activities revolve around agriculture, hunting, fishing, gathering, and crafts with rubber products. Agriculture is the predominant activity among the Tacana. The agricultural process is organized so that in each productive unit (composed of one or two families) they cultivate 1ha. of rice, 1ha. of corn, 1/2 ha. of banana and 1/4 ha. cassava. Some small quantity of products, which is not necessarily a surplus, in the strict sense of the term, is destined for commercialization, from which the resources for the acquisition of complementary foods or other items will come. Previously, the main economic activity came from the production of rubber.

== Symbolism ==
Traditional religious beliefs and practices still continue to exert an important influence on the daily life of the Tacana. Shamans celebrate traditional ceremonies on key dates of the agricultural calendar. The "baba tcuai" or "tata janana" (shamans) are not only healers, but also guardians of the welfare of the community and the universe. The ceremonies in which the shamans participate are held in secret houses of worship in the jungle. In some Tacana de Pando communities, the shaman is known by the name of "Baba Cuana".
