= Baure language =

Endangered Arawakan language of Bolivia

Bauré
- Baure
- Native to: Bolivia
- Region: Beni Department
- Ethnicity: 980 Baure (2006)
- Native speakers: 20 (2010)
- Revival
- Language family: Arawakan: Southern; Bolivia–Parana; Moxos; Bauré
- Dialects: Baure; Carmelito; Joaquiniano (†)

Official status
- Official language in: Bolivia

Language codes
- ISO 639-3: brg
- Glottolog: baur1253
- ELP: Baure
- Baure is classified as Critically Endangered by the UNESCO Atlas of the World's Languages in Danger.

Baure or Bauré is a severely endangered Arawakan language spoken by only 40 of the thousand Baure people of the Beni Department of northwest of Magdalena, Bolivia. Most speakers have been shifting to Spanish. In 2010, the language had around 20 native speakers left, based on the evidence available. Since Supreme Decree N.25894 in 2000, it has been considered one of the official indigenous languages of Bolivia, which was included in the Political Constitution passed on 7 February 2009.

== History and demography ==
According to the data of Crevels and Muysken (2009) and Crevels (2012), the number of Baure speakers was 67. However, it is still considered a language in serious danger of extinction. Danielson (2012) counted 3000 to 5000 members of the Baure ethnic group, mostly living in the Baure municipality and surrounding communities, such as El Carmen. The majority of the people who can speak fluid Baure are over 60 years old. Around 500 people, older than 40 years, are considered passively knowledgeable in Baure. All Baure speakers are bilingual in Spanish, though the proficiency level of older speakers is basic. The language is spoken in limited contexts, such as elderly people at home, greetings, jokes, folktales, ritual conversations, and in songs, particularly the Song of the Baures, which is sung as part of festivals. Thanks to literacy workshops in the low counties and study of the language, the language has experienced a surge in use, with many speakers beginning to use it daily and transmit it to their children.

The history of the Baures and other communities in the Llanos de Mojos region can be divided into five major periods or moments of change: the pre-Hispanic era, the era of the Jesuits, the period of the exploitation of rubber in the late 19th century, the mid-20th century with its significant reforms and policies, and the era of growing indigenous awareness and politicization, reflected in an indigenous movement beginning in the 1990s. Thanks to this movement, indigenous identity acquired a new value, indigenous self-confidence improved and, with it, the appreciation of traditional cultures and customs, as well as interest in native languages, such as Baure.

== Classification ==
Baure belongs to the Arawakan language family, more specifically the Southern Arawakan languages, the branch to which the Moxo languages also belong, including Trinitario, Ignaciano, Loretano, and Javierano. Baure is most closely related, in lexical and grammatical terms, to the Trinitarian and Ignatian Moxo languages. One of the distinctive characteristics of Baure, with respect to Moxo languages, is the loss of final vowels.

== Dialects ==
Three dialects or languages are recognized as part of Baure. These are Baure proper, Carmelito, spoken by only one person in 2016, and Joaquiniano, whose last fluent speaker, Concepción Mercado Bayo (nicknamed Mama Concha), died in 2005. Only some rememberers still exist of Joaquiniano.

== Phonology ==
Baure has 14 consonants, including the glottal stop, whose phonemic status is still not very clear. Four allophones are also observed:

Consonants
		Bilabial	Labiodental	Alveolar	Postalveolar	Palatal	Velar	Glottal
Plosive		p		t			k	(ʔ)
Affricate	voiceless				tʃ			
Affricate	voiced				dʒ			
Fricative	voiceless			s	ʃ			h
Fricative	voiced		v					
Nasal		m		n				
Trill					r			
Semivowel		w				j		

Baure has four basic vowels, which are not distinguished by length or nasality: i, e, o and a. The vowel o can also be realized as [u], often in combination with the semivowel /w/.

== Grammar ==
Baure has an active–stative syntax.

=== Noun classes and morphology ===
Nouns, adjectives and verbs are open word classes in Baure. Adverbs constitute a semi-closed word class, and closed word classes are possessive, personal and demonstrative pronouns, articles, clause connectors and other particles. Personal clitics, which refer to possessors, as in (1), subjects, as in (2), and objects, as in (3), and clausal clitics are important bound morphemes that function at the phrase and sentence level.

ni=shir
1SG=son
my son

pi=nik
2SG=eat
you eat/ate

ni-pa=ro ti eton
1SG-give=3SG.M DEM.1.F woman
I give/gave it to the woman

Unlike personal clitics, personal pronouns are not bound morphemes but free and are composed of a clitic and the element -ti', such as piti' 'you'. Possessive pronouns are made up of three elements: personal clitic + -ti' + -r(o), such as beep' 'yours' in (4):

tech pitir pania'
DEM.2.M 2SG.GEN towel
This cloth/towel of yours

Baure presents a set of demonstrative determiners, which always precede the noun and are distinguished according to three degrees of distance. Table 3 shows the demonstrative determinants and articles.

Demonstrative Articles and Pronouns
	Singular		Plural
	Masculine	Feminine	Plural
Article	to	ti	to
'this' DEM1	te	ti	to
'that' DEM2	tech	tich	to nech
'that (distant)' DEM3	ten	tin	to nen

Regarding nouns, three groups are distinguished according to their possession capacity: possession nouns proper, which are linked forms that cannot be used without the marking of the possessor and include kinship terms, e.g. =shir 'son', body parts, e.g. =wojis 'hand', and some other specific elements, e.g. =wer 'house'; non-possessed nouns, which are forms that can be used freely, but from which a possessed form can be derived with the possessive suffix -n(o) 'POS', e.g. e.g. yakis 'firewood' > niyakison 'my firewood', jopi 'pitcher' > nijapin 'my jug'; and nouns that can never be possessed, e.g. ses 'sun', wajis 'star', wapoer 'river'. Nouns can have the following categories marked: plural, as seen in (5), diminutives/augmentatives, as in (6), and locatives, as in (7).

ni-nev
mosquito-PL
mosquitos

sipori-chi
frog-DIM
little frog

pari-ye
house-LOC
in the house

The baure has a noun classification system that is marked through more than 50 classifiers, which are attached to adjectives, numerals and verbs, but also to the compounds of the noun, to refer to the class of which of the nouns is a member noun (human, animal, liquid, food, etc.), as seen in (8):

iyowko-a-no to ka'ano-nev
many-CLF:animal-NMLZ ART animal-PL
many animals

As for adjectives, three classes are distinguished: bound adjectives, which always have a classifier or the root of a bound noun attached and which describe size, dimension, age and a few other basic concepts, e.g. e.g. cho-pe [big-CLF:covered] 'big (knife)', chino-pi [old-CLF:long&thin] 'old (thread)'; Class II adjectives that do not have an attached classifier and include, for example, loanwords from Spanish, such as picor 'rogue', sons 'sonso'; and class III adjectives which are derived forms and include, for example, color terms such as mosero-po-n [red-CLF:crowd-NML] 'red (fish)', kotipo-sero-n [white-tooth-NML] 'white tooth'.

Verbs are the most complex class of words in Baure. They may consist of different main levels of affixation within which there are different sets of affixes that behave in different ways. These levels are the verb stem, which is the most basic lexical element of a verb, the verb stem, which is made up of the stem plus some particular affixes attached to it, and the verb base, which is the actual unit of the verb. meaning of the verb and also its form of citation. Aspectual affixes and valence modifiers can be attached to the base of the verb, which do not change the meaning of the verb, as well as clitics, which can be personal, as seen in Table 4, and clausal.

Table 4: Intransitive verb paradigm =kach 'go'
ni=kach	1SG=go	‘I go/leave’
pi=kach	2SG=go	‘You go/leave’
ri=kach	3SG.F=go	‘she goes/leaves’
ro=kach	3SG.M=go	‘he goes/leaves’
vi=kach	1PL=go	‘we go/leave’
yi=kach	2PL=go	‘you (pl) go/leave’
no=kach	3PL=go	‘they go/leave’

In Baure, locative adverbs are distinguished, as locative. e.g. ne’ 'here', noiy 'there', temporal adverbs, as p. e.g. katir 'soon, early', nariki 'now, today', adverbs of degree, as e.g. imir 'very', ijiriaw 'so much', adverbs of mode, as e.g. kik, kiyok 'really', moeh 'certainly', etc.

Furthermore, a set of connecting particles are distinguished e.g. ach 'and', apo 'or', tiwe' 'but', etc.

=== Syntax ===
In Baure, the least marked order of constituents is VSO, with the verb or non-verbal predicate at the beginning of the clause.

no=nik to aren to ro=soki
3PL-eat ART bird ART 3SG.M-seed
The birds eat the seeds (of a tree)

In Baure, it is very common, however, to have only one central argument represented by an explicit NP, that is VS or VO, as seen in (10a) and (10b):

ro=kach tech sipori
3SG.M-go DEM.2.M toad
The toad left

ro=asko-pa tech sipori
3SG.M-help-go DEM.2.M toad
He went to help the toad

The imperative is marked through the nominalizing suffix -no 'NML', as seen in (11):

pi=amo-no in
2SG-bring-NMLZ water
Bring water!

For negation, the negative particle nga 'no' is used, or other more specific particles, such as porok 'never', which always precede the verb or the predicate, as observed in (12a) and (12b):

riti’ ri=veko-wo tiwe’ ndi’ nga ni=cho-wo=ro
3SG.F 3SG.F=speak-COP but 1SG NEG 1SG=understand-ABS=3SG.M
She is singing, but I don't understand it

ri=jewe-sa-wo porok ri=aviko-po
3SGf=take.dip-CLF:water-COP never.again 3SG.F=came.back-RFLX
She took a dip in the water and never came back

Only a few questions include an interrogative particle, as seen in (13). In most cases, questions are constructed as specific interrogative predicates, as in (14), where the question for a person's name is constructed on the verb -woyo- 'to have a name' in the reduplicated form, or in (15), where the question about someone's identity is constructed based on the verb -woyik- 'to be'. As seen in these examples, most questions in Baure are marked by the nominalizing suffix -n(o) 'NML', which is attached to the main verb.

ko=pi ejevipoeko-wo-no
why=2SG fall-COP-NMLZ
Why did you fall

pi=woyo~woyo-wo-n
2SG.name~INT-COP-NMLZ
What is your name

ro=woyiko-wo-n eton apo jir
3SG.M=be-COP-NMLZ woman or man
What are you - a woman or a man?

== See also ==
- Llanos de Moxos (archaeology)
