= Araona language =

Pano–Tacanan language spoken in Bolivia

Araona
- alaōna
- Pronunciation: [aɽaoːna]
- Native to: Bolivia
- Region: La Paz Department (Bolivia)
- Ethnicity: Araona
- Native speakers: 110 (2006)
- Language family: Pano–Tacanan: Tacanan; Araona–Tacana; Araona
- Writing system: Latin

Official status
- Official language in: Bolivia

Language codes
- ISO 639-3: aro
- Glottolog: arao1248
- ELP: Araona

Araona or Cavina is an indigenous language spoken by the South America Araona people; about 90% of the 90 Araona people are fluent (W. Adelaar). Use of the language amongst the tribe is considered vigorous although Spanish knowledge is increasing. The Araonans live in the headwaters of the Manupari river in northwest Bolivia. Their language has a dictionary and portions of the Bible have been translated into Araona.

Capachene and Machui are dialects of either Araona or of Cavineña.

== History ==
The Araona people and their language were long ignored in the written, European-based historical traditions, long after the Conquest of the Americas and what is now Bolivia. The first written historical mention of the Araona people and their language comes from the Franciscan missionaries Manuel Mancini and Fidel Codenach in the late 1800s, were unable to found any sort of mission in this area of the La Paz department because of the conditions on the ground. The Araona were the most populous ethnic group in the region of Colonia Nacional, and were one of the many indigenous groups who were displaced from their villages and used as slaves for the rubber industry at the end of the 19th century. Those who managed to survive and escape from servitude went on to establish themselves in various settlements in the area between the Manorimi and Monopare Rivers. In 1965, Protestant Evangelical activists and missionaries from the SIL International created a permanent settlement and cooperated with the Araona communities to establish links with other indigenous groups.

== Phonology ==
The Araona phonemic inventory consists of four vowels (/a/, /e/, /i/, /o/), and 19 consonants.

Consonant phonemes
		Labial	Alveolar		Post-alv./ Palatal	Velar		Glottal
		Labial	plain	sibilant	Post-alv./ Palatal	plain	labial	Glottal
Nasal		m	n		(ɲ) ⟨n⟩			
Stop	voiceless	p	t	t͡s ⟨ts⟩	t͡ɕ ⟨ch⟩	k	kʷ ⟨kw⟩	ʔ ⟨’⟩
Stop	voiced	b ~ ᵐb ⟨b⟩	d ~ ⁿd ⟨d⟩		dʲ ⟨dy⟩			
Fricative	voiceless			s	ç ⟨sh⟩			h
Fricative	voiced			z				
Approximant			l ~ ɽ ⟨l⟩		j ⟨y⟩		w	

== Verbal morphology ==
Like other Tacanan languages, Araona has four periodic tense markers: diurnal -tseiñe, nocturnal -sisa, auroral -huena and vesperal -niapona, with cognates in Cavineña
