= Reyesano language =

Endangered Tacanan language of Bolivia

Reyesano
- Chirgua, Chiriba, Sapiboca
- Native to: Bolivia
- Region: Beni Department
- Ethnicity: 1,130 (1994 census)
- Native speakers: 12–15 (2011)
- Language family: Tacanan: Araona–Tacanan; Cavinena–Tacana; Tacana Proper; Reyesano

Official status
- Official language in: Bolivia

Language codes
- ISO 639-3: rey
- Glottolog: reye1240
- ELP: Reyesano

Reyesano, or Chirigua (Chiriba), is a nearly extinct Tacanan language that was spoken by only a few speakers, including children, in 1961 in Bolivia. It is spoken by the Maropa people who number 4,505 in 2012.

There still are adult speakers in the largely indigenous community of El Cozar in Reyes. However, it is doubtful that this language will survive much into the 21st century. Such is the margination of the indigenous people in the Beni that very little Reyesano words have entered the popular criollo Spanish, very unlike the situation in Quechua and Aymara influenced areas. There are many indigenous terms in "camba" (Spanish of the Beni) but they are mostly of Guaraní origin carried to the Beni by the original settlers from Santa Cruz.

Evidently the name Reyesano comes from the name of the town of Reyes, of the José Ballivián Province in the Department of the Beni in the plains adjacent to the Bolivian Amazon. The language is also known as Sapiboca (Sapibocona), Maropa, Chumana, and perhaps Warisa (Guariza); these may have corresponded to different dialects.

== Phonology ==
=== Consonants ===
| | | Labial | Dental/ Alveolar | Retroflex | (Alveolo-) palatal | Velar | | Glottal |
| | | Labial | Dental/ Alveolar | Retroflex | (Alveolo-) palatal | plain | lab. | Glottal |
|---|---|---|---|---|---|---|---|---|
| Plosive/ Affricate | voiceless | p | t | tʂ | tɕ | k | kʷ | |
| Plosive/ Affricate | vd./prenasal | b ~ ᵐb | | dʐ ~ ᶯdʐ | | | | |
| Fricative | voiceless | | s | | ɕ | | | h |
| Fricative | voiced | (β) | ð | | | | | |
| Nasal | | m | n | | | | | |
| Rhotic | | | ɾ | | | | | |
| Approximant | | w | l | | j | | | |

Voiced sounds /b, dʐ/ are heard as prenasal [ᵐb, ᶯdʐ], except in word-initial positions, where the nasal component is weak or not heard.

/w/ may also be heard as a fricative [β] when before front vowels /i, e/.

=== Vowels ===
| | Front | Central | Back |
|---|---|---|---|
| Close | i | | ʊ |
| Mid | e | | ʊ |
| Open | | a | |

Sounds /i, ʊ/ may also be heard as semivowels [j, w] when in the position of consonants.
