= Tacana language =

Western Tacanan language of Bolivia

Tacana
- Native to: Bolivia
- Region: La Paz Department (Bolivia)
- Ethnicity: 7,400 Tacana people (2012)
- Native speakers: 1,200 (2012)
- Language family: Tacanan: Araona–Tacanan; Cavinena–Tacana; Tacana Proper; Tacana

Official status
- Official language in: Bolivia

Language codes
- ISO 639-3: tna
- Glottolog: taca1256
- ELP: Tacana

Tacana is a Western Tacanan language spoken by some 1,800 Tacana people in Bolivia out of an ethnic population of 5,000. They live in the forest along the Beni and Madre de Dios rivers in the north of La Paz Department. Numerous dialects, now extinct, have been attributed to Tacana: Ayaychuna, Babayana, Chiliuvo, Chivamona, Idiama (Ixiama), Pamaino, Pasaramona, Saparuna, Siliama, Tumupasa (Maracani, "Tupamasa"), Uchupiamona, Yabaypura, and Yubamona.

== Phonology ==
=== Consonants ===
| | | Labial | Dental/ Alveolar | | Post- alveolar | Velar | Glottal |
|---|---|---|---|---|---|---|---|
| Plosive | voiceless | p | t | | | k | ʔ |
| Plosive | voiced | b | d | | | | |
| Affricate | | | t͡s | | t͡ʃ | | |
| Fricative | voiceless | | s | | ʃ | | h |
| Fricative | voiced | β | ð | | | | |
| Nasal | | m | n | | | | |
| Rhotic | | | ɾ | r | | | |
| Semivowel | | w | | | j | | |

=== Vowels ===
| | Front | Central | Back |
|---|---|---|---|
| Close | i | | u |
| Mid | e | | |
| Open | | a | |
