= Cayubaba language =

Language isolate of Bolivia

Cayubaba
- Kayuvava
- Native to: Bolivia
- Region: Beni Department
- Ethnicity: 2,203 Cayubaba people (2012)
- Native speakers: 3 rememberers (2005)
- Language family: Language isolate

Official status
- Official language in: Bolivia

Language codes
- ISO 639-3: cyb
- Glottolog: cayu1262
- ELP: Cayuvava

Cayubaba (Cayuvava, Cayuwaba, Kayuvava) is a moribund language of the Bolivian Amazon. The Cayubaba people inhabit the Beni region to the west of the Mamoré River, North of the Santa Ana Yacuma, with a population of 794 inhabitants.

Since the declaration of the Supreme Decree N.º 25894 on September 11, 2000, Cayubaba has been one of the official indigenous languages of Bolivia, which was included in the Political Constitution, which was introduced on February 7, 2009.

== History ==
The first European to establish contact with the Cayubaba was the Jesuit missionary priest P. Agustín Zapata in 1693. As Crevels and Muysken (2012) point out, it was during this first visit to Cayubaba territory that Father Zapata saw seven villages, of which six had approximately 1,800 inhabitants and one had more than 2,000. At the beginning of the 18th century, P. Antonio Garriga funded the Mission of Exaltation of the Holy Cross, which was primarily inhabited by the Cayubaba. Later the Missions of San Carlos, Conception, and Peñas were founded.

In 1909, when Swedish geologist and paleontologist Erland Nordenskiöld visited the Cayubaba, there were only 100 people from the group, who apart from their language, kept very little of their native culture. The Cayubaba region was famous for growing tobacco. At the time of the exploitation of rubber, the commercialization of tobacco was intense throughout the country, and Exaltación became a busy port on the Mamoré River. In the mid- 20th century, however, the cultivation of tobacco was almost stopped by the mass emigration of Cayubaba to Exaltación, who were fleeing the measles epidemic that almost decimated the population.

=== Current situation ===
As shown by Crevels and Muysken (2012), the territory of Cayubaba forms part of a region historically known as Mojos (or Moxos), that covers approximately 200,000 square kilometers of what is currently the Department of Beni. Above all, the Cayubaba focus on traditional farming, growing rice, yucca, corn, bananas, sugar cane, beans, pumpkins, sweet potatoes, etc. They also raised livestock, although on a small scale. The Cayubaba community meets at the Subcentral Indígena Cayubaba, which is affiliated to the Indigenous Peoples Center of Beni (CPIB) and is, therefore, a member of the Confederation of Indigenous Peoples of Eastern Bolivia (CIDOB). Only 6 speakers were reported in 1975.

As of 2005, Mily Crevels reported that only two elderly speakers remain in the village of Exaltación, located on the left bank of the Mamoré River. An additional elderly speaker was also found in the city of Trinidad.

According to the 2012 Bolivian census, there were 2,203 of Cayubaba, of whom 1,246 learned speak Cayubaba language in their childhood and for only 12 Cayubaba was their main language.

== Language contact ==
Jolkesky (2016) notes that there are lexical similarities with the Arawak, Bororo, Takana, and Tupi language families due to contact.

== Genetic classification ==
As indicated by Crevels and Muysken (2012), despite all the tentative proposals to genetically classify Cayubaba (see, for example, Greenberg, 1987); Kaufman, 1990, 1994; Suárez, 1974), the language is still considered a language isolate.

== Phonology ==
=== Consonants ===
Cayubaba presents the following system of consonantal phonemes based on Key (1961, 1962, 1967).

Consonant phonemes
		Bilabial	Alveolar	Palatal	Velar	Glottal
Occlusive	Voiceless	p	t	tʃ ⟨ch⟩	k	
Occlusive	Voiced	b	d	dʒ ⟨dy⟩		
Nasal		m	n	ɲ ⟨ñ⟩		
Continuant	Voiceless		s	ʃ ⟨sh⟩		h
Continuant	Voiced	β ⟨v⟩				
Flap/Vibrant			r			
Semivowel		w		j ⟨y⟩		

/r/ has allophones that include [ɾ~ l~ d̥].

=== Vowels ===
The system of vowel phonemes is taken from Crevels and Muysken (2012, 2023) and based on Key (1961).

Vowel phonemes
	Front	Central	Back
High	i	ɨ ⟨ï⟩	u
Mid	e		o
Low	æ ⟨ë⟩	a	ɔ ⟨ò⟩

== Grammar ==
=== Word classes ===
Regarding the vocabulary and word classes in Cayubaba, the following can be pointed out (Crevels and Muysken, 2012):

In Cayubaba, there are five distinct word classes: verbs (for example boro 'give', tavu 'swim'), nouns (for example veje-veje 'wind', ñoko 'monkey'), pronouns (for example ãre-ai '1SG', ãre-a '2SG'), modifiers and particles, for example kóra 'perhaps', ñõhõ (now).

==== Adjectives ====
In regards to adjectives, many adjectival concepts are expressed through predicate adjectives formed with the affixes pa(+i)... +ha, for example: pa-i-ra-ha ''Well, be well', pa-tï-ha 'red, is red'. This is to say, it is difficult to establish criteria for the class of adjectives separate from verbs.

==== Adverbs ====
In addition, Cayubaba presents some adverbs, such as pïïrë boro 'slowly', irire 'good'.

==== Numerals ====
The basic numerical system includes five numerals: karata/kata 'one', mitia/mite 'two', kurapa 'three', chaada/chaad 'four', y me(i)da(ru) 'five'. These numerals can be combined with the rirobo element (irobo/erobo/iro/hiro/kiro) 'five more' to form numbers up to ten. The numbers eleven to nineteen are formed with the augmentative suffix -hiiñe 'and, in addition to'. Starting from one hundred, borrowed words from Castilian are used, such as karata-siento [one-one hundred] 'one hundred', karata-mirie [one-thousand] 'a thousand'.

=== Morphology ===
Regarding the nominal morphology, Cayuvava shows a process of full reduplication, for example wïrï-wïrï 'iguana', and partial, for example uku-ku 'pig'. In addition, there are also six complex and productive processes of nominal composition:

Composition processes	Example
noun nucleus (possessed) + noun modifier (possessor)	hebë-kafe ‘coffee husk'
sequence of roots with figurative meaning	ridore-maka‘año’ (lit. ‘burning-sun’)
verb + noun	vede-ñika‘dueño de casa’ (lit. ‘have-home’)
onomatopoeic element + noun	sĩsĩha-ñõko 'type of monkey’
modifier + noun	chakïrï-hiki ‘maíz suave’ (lit. ‘soft corn’)
modifier + noun + modifier	sïsïha-pichï-yïtï‘pequeña hormiga negra’(lit. ‘small-ant-black’)

The plural nominal is expressed through the proclitic me = as observed in (Figure 1). In nominal sentences, the proclitic me, is appended to the first element of the sentence, as seen in (Figure 2).

me=i-asi
PL=ART-man
'the men'

me=rishò raviri
PL=new oars
‘new oars'

- The personal pronouns in Cayubaba function as independent elements, but they actually are derived from verb forms. The basic pronouns, which are presented in Table 3, are derived from the existential verb ãre 'there are', 'exist'. In this verb form, the direct object marker is suffixed. In the case of plural pronouns, you can put the personal markers before the suffix -hi ‘present active state'. These pronouns may be considered, then, like presentative pronouns in the sense of 'I'm the one who...'.

Table 3: Base Pronouns
	singular	plural
1st person	ãre-ai	ãre-ere/ãre-hi-ere
2nd person	ãre-a	ãre-pere/ãre-hi-pere
3rd person	ãre-e/ããr-e	ãre-riki/ãre-hi-riki

- As for the verbal morphology, there are processes of reduplication and affixation, as well as a set of proclitic and enclitic elements. There are certain types of reduplication, for example [root + root] reduplication in ròmò-ròmò 'kneel down' to express an ongoing action. As for the process of affixation, the verb can be modified by a series of prefixes and suffixes that indicate the subject, object, time, appearance, mode, etc., for example, the first-position prefixes that mark time and appearance, such as the mara-'hypothetical future' in (3) and mera- 'simple future' in (4).

mara-h-i-bachari-dya
FUT.HIP-1SG-CL-inform-2SG.OI
‘(I) would inform you.’

mera-h-i-bekere~re-ë
FUT-1SG-CL-learn~CAUS.INC-2SG.OD
‘I will teach.’

- The verbal complex can also be modified by a series of proclitic and enclitic elements. Within the proclitic elements, there are modal/evidential proclitics, chui='certainty', manoro= 'almost' (surely), to have the intention. Within the enclitic elements, there are locative enclitics, e.g. "=jahi" 'below', "=puti"'outside', the temporal or aspectual enclitics, e.g. "koidi" 'sometimes', "=ñoho" 'now', and the relational enclitics, e.g. "=dyë" 'together', = ma 'with respect to a woman'.

=== Syntax ===
With regard to the syntax of Cayubaba, the following is seen (Crevels and Muysken, 2012):

- Cayubaba does not present a fixed constituent order. The only mandatory element in the clause is that the predicate usually precedes the subject and objects, as is observed in (5). If the subject is a free personal pronoun, then it always precedes the predicate, as observed in (6).

ari-a-ñuhu kita ki=tò̃rene dy-a-ñika-che
{CMPL-INTL-to bring} water ART-woman COM.LOC-3SG-house-3SG.POS
‘The woman brought water to her house.’

ãree a-poërëre-ha karata toro-takorako mitia takorako
PRO:3SG {CL-to buy-RES} one M-rooster two hens
'He buys a rooster and two hens.’

- With respect to the nominal phrase, the modifier precedes the nucleus, as shown in (7). However, the possessive element follows that which is possessed, as is observed in (8).

mitia tò̃rene
two women
‘two women’

avope ki=ñeatò̃rene
father {ART-my wife}
‘the father of my wife'

- In Cayubaba, processes of incorporation are observed, as in (9), which consist of the incorporation of the direct object in the verb, which is in the same accent group.

mera-h-i-dïkï-ñika ãrehidya
FUT-1SG-CL-make-house PRO:2SG.OI
‘I will build the house.’

- Cayubaba also presents different subordination processes. The proclitic ki = in its subordinate function, for example, is used to indicate add-ons, as in (10), and it can also complete an adverbial subordinate, as in (11). It also distinguishes conjunctions that mark subordinate clauses and appear at the beginning of the sentence, for example, "=chu" 'because' in (12).

ye-pe-h-a-ve-dya ki-h-i-hudyuhi-a
{NEG-always-1SG-CL-to say-2SG.OI} {SUB-1SG-CL-to leave-2SG.OD}
'I tell you, I will never leave you.’

ki-t-i-bòechò k-a-ukuku-che
{SUB-3SG-CL-to sell} ART-3SG-pork-3SG.POS
‘when he sold his pig’

chu h-i-bachari-e
because {1SG-CL-to tell-3SG.O}
'Because I told him’

== See also ==
- Llanos de Moxos (archaeology)
