= Cavineña language =

Tacanan language of Bolivia

Cavineña
- Native to: Bolivia
- Region: Beni Department
- Native speakers: 600 (2012)
- Language family: Pano–Tacanan: Tacanan; Araona–Tacana; Cavinena–Tacana; Cavineña

Official status
- Official language in: Bolivia

Language codes
- ISO 639-3: cav
- Glottolog: cavi1250
- ELP: Cavineña

Cavineña is an indigenous language spoken on the Amazonian plains of northern Bolivia by over 1,000 Cavineño people. Although Cavineña is still spoken (and still learned by some children), it is an endangered language. Guillaume (2004) states that about 1200 people speak the language, out of a population of around 1700. Nearly all Cavineña are bilingual in Spanish.

The Cavineño people live in several communities near the Beni River, which flows north from the Andes. The nearest towns are Reyes (to the south) and Riberalta (to the north).

== Phonology ==
Where the practical orthography is different from IPA, it is shown between angled brackets:

Consonants
		Labial	Alveolar	Palatal	Velar	Labiovelar	Glottal
Nasal		m	n	ɲ ⟨ny⟩			
Plosive	voiceless	p	t	c ⟨ty⟩	k	kʷ ⟨kw⟩	
Plosive	voiced	b	d	ɟ ⟨dy⟩			
Affricate			ts	t͡ɕ ⟨ch⟩			
Fricative			s	ɕ ⟨sh⟩			h ⟨j⟩
Lateral			ɺ ⟨r⟩	ʎ ⟨ry⟩			
Approximant				j ⟨y⟩		w	

Vowels
	Front	Central	Back
High	i		ʊ ⟨u⟩
Mid	e/ɛ ⟨e⟩		
Low		a	

Examples in the morphology and syntax sections are written in the practical orthography.

== Morphology ==
=== Verbs ===
Verbs do not show agreement with their arguments, but are inflected for tense, aspect, mood, negation, and aktionsart, among other categories. There are six tense, aspect, or mood affixes:

-ya	imperfective	for present, generic, habitual, and near future events
-wa	perfective	for events that occurred earlier the same day
-chine	recent past	for events that occurred between a day and a year ago
-kware	remote past	for events that occurred a year or more ago
-buke	remote future	for events far in the future
e-…-u	potential	for events that are contingent on other events

The following examples show the remote past and perfective affixes:

I-ke =bakwe [e-kwe e-wane=tsewe] kanajara-kware [e-kwe tujuri=ju].
1SG-FM =CONTR 1SG-GEN 1-wife=ASSOC rest-REM.PAST 1SG-GEN mosquito.net=LOC
'Me, I was resting with my wife in my mosquito net.'

Pakaka-wa =mi [manga=ju=ke].
fall-PERF =2SG(-FM) mango.tree=LOC=LIG
'You fell from the mango tree.'

Aktionsart suffixes include:

-tere and tirya	completive
-bisha	incompletive
-nuka	repeated/reiterative

The following examples show the completive and reiterative suffixes:

Shana-tirya-kware =tuna [piya=kwana mariku=kwana jadya].
leave-COMP-REM.PAST =3PL(-ERG) arrow=PL bag=PL and
'(They ran away and) left all their arrows and bags behind.'

Peadya tunka mara=kwana ju-atsu =tu ekwita kwa-nuka-kware babi=ra…
one ten year=APPROX be-SS =3SG(-FM) person go-REITR-REM.PAST hunt=PURP.MOT
'After about ten years or so, the man went hunting again.'

Cavineña is the first language in the Amazon for which an antipassive voice has been described.

Cavineña has a periodic tense paradigm with four suffixes: diurnal -chinepe, nocturnal -sisa, auroral -wekaka and vesperal -apuna (Guillaume 2008:126), with cognates in the rest of Tacanan. These markers can be redundantly combined with temporal adverbs:

meta-tu nei ju-sisa-kware.
at.night-3SG rain be-NOCT-REM.PST
‘It rained all night long.’

Among the verbal suffixes, we also find a celerative -wisha encoding quick speed.

Iji-wisha-kwe e-na!
drink-CELER-IMP:SG DUMMY-water
‘Drink your water quickly (and let’s go)!’ (Guillaume 2008: 202)

== Syntax ==
=== Nouns and noun phrases ===
==== Subtypes of nouns ====
There are three subtypes of nouns in Cavineña:

1. e-nouns, which are a closed class of about 100 to 150 terms which must take a prefix e-. (The prefix is realised as y- before the vowel a).
2. kinship nouns, which are a small class of about 30 terms which are obligatorily inflected for their possessor.
3. independent nouns, which are an open class of a couple of thousand terms. Independent nouns do not take any e- prefix nor any possessor inflections.

==== Case marking ====
Case marking on noun phrases is shown through a set of clitic postpositions, including the following:

=ra	ergative case
=tsewe	associative case (= English 'with')
=ja	dative case
=ja	genitive case
=ju	locative case

The dative and genitive cases are homophonous.

Pronouns (independent or bound) also show these case distinctions.

The following example shows several of the case markers in context:

I-ke =bakwe [e-kwe e-wane=tsewe] kanajara-kware [e-kwe tujuri=ju].
1SG-FM =CONTR 1SG-GEN 1-wife=ASSOC rest-REM.PAST 1SG-GEN mosquito.net=LOC
'Me, I was resting with my wife in my mosquito net.'

Pakaka-wa=mi [manga=ju=ke].
fall-PERF=2SG(-FM) mango.tree=LOC=LIG
'You fell from the mango tree.'

Ai=tu-ke=mi mare-wa?
INT=3SG-FM=2SG(-ERG) shoot-PERF
'What did you shoot?'

==== Order in noun phrases ====
Noun phrases show the order:

(Relative Clause)-(Quantifier)-(Possessor)-Noun-(Adjective)-(Plural marker)-(Relative clause)

The following examples show some of these orders.

E-marikaka ebari=kwana
NPF-cooking:pot big=PL
'big cooking pots'

dutya tunaja etawiki=kwana e-tiru=ke
all 3PL:GEN bedding=PL RES-burn-LIG
'all their bedding that had burnt'

(The clitic =ke 'ligature' appears at the end of a relative clause.)

=== Pronouns ===
Pronouns in Cavineña can appear in either independent or bound forms. The two kinds of pronouns are pronounced almost exactly the same, but the bound pronouns appear in second position, after the first word of the sentence. Independent pronouns tend to be contrastive, and usually appear first in the sentence.

The following pronouns are found:

Absolutive pronouns
		singular	dual	plural
1st person		i-Ø-ke	ya-tse	e-kwana
2nd person		mi-Ø-ke	me-tse	mi-kwana
3rd person	neutral	tu-Ø-ke	ta-tse	tu-na
3rd person	proximate	ri-Ø-ke	re-tse	re-na

Ergative pronouns
		singular	dual	plural
1st person		e-Ø-ra	ya-tse-ra	e-kwana-ra
2nd person		mi-Ø-ra	me-tse-ra	mi-kwana-ra
3rd person	neutral	tu-Ø-ra	ta-tse-ra	tu-na-ra
3rd person	proximate	riya-Ø-ra(?)	re-tse-ra	re-na-ra

Dative pronouns
		singular	dual	plural
1st person		e-Ø-kwe	ya-tse-ja	e-kwana-ja
2nd person		mi-Ø-kwe	me-tse-ja	mi-kwana-ja
3rd person	neutral	tu-Ø-ja	ta-tse-ja	tu-na-ja
3rd person	proximate	re-Ø-ja	re-tse-ja	re-na-ja

notes that the formative suffix -ke (of singular absolutive bound pronouns) and the ergative suffix -ra (in ergative bound pronouns) do not show up when absolutive or ergative pronouns occur last among the second position clitics.

=== Sentences ===
Cavineña has ergative case marking on the subject of a transitive verb. For sentences with a non-pronominal subject, this is shown with an ergative case clitic /=ra/:

Iba=ra=tu iye-chine takure.
jaguar=ERG=3SG(-FM) kill-REC.PAST chicken
'The jaguar killed the chicken.'

For a sentence with a pronominal subject, there are distinct ergative and absolutive forms of the pronouns:

I-ke=bakwe kwa-kware=dya=jutidya.
1SG(ABS)-FM=CONTR go-REM=FOC=RESTR
'I just went.'

E-ra=tu [e-kwe tata-chi] adeba-ya=ama.
1SG-ERG=3SG(-FM) 1SG-GEN father-AFFTN know-IMPFV=NEG
'I do not know my father.'

Verbs do not inflect for the person of the subject or other arguments in the clause. Instead, a set of clitic pronouns occurs in the second position of the clause, as in the following examples:

Tume=tuna-ja=tu-ke=Ø be-ti-wa budari.
then=3PL-DAT=3SG-FM=1SG(-ERG) bring-go.TEMP-PERF banana
'I will go and bring bananas for them.'

Kwadisha-ya =tu-ke =e-ra =e-kwe encomienda [e-kwe ata=ja=ishu].
send-IMPFV =3SG-FM =1SG-ERG =1SG-DAT package 1SG-GEN relatives=GEN=PURP.GNL
'I am sending a package to my relative.'

The clitics are ordered so that 3rd person pronouns precede 2nd person pronouns, which precede 1st person pronouns. (Some of the clitic pronouns in these examples have a formative element /-ke/ after them and some do not.)
