= Madidi River =

River in La Paz Department, Bolivia

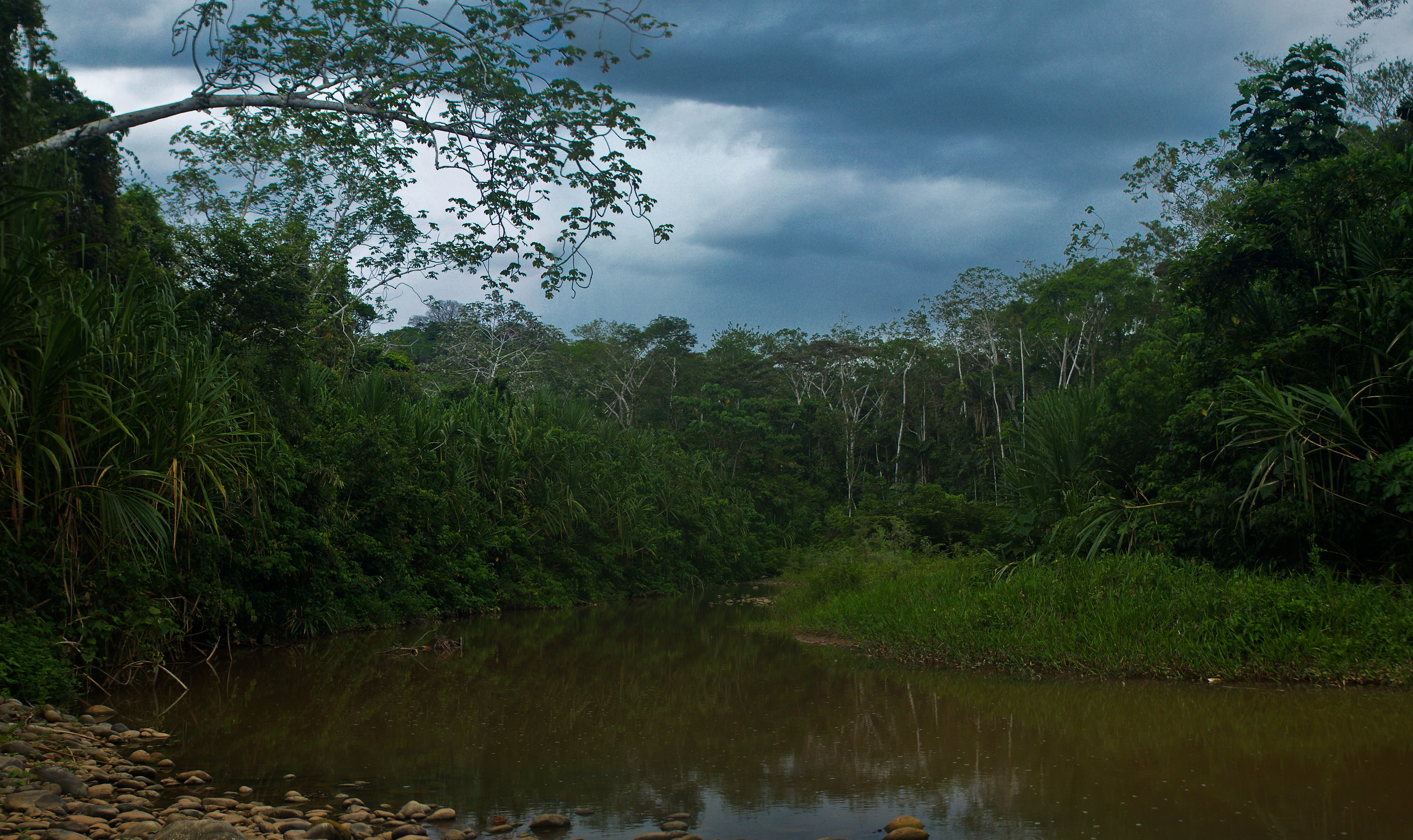
- The Madidi River in Madidi National Park

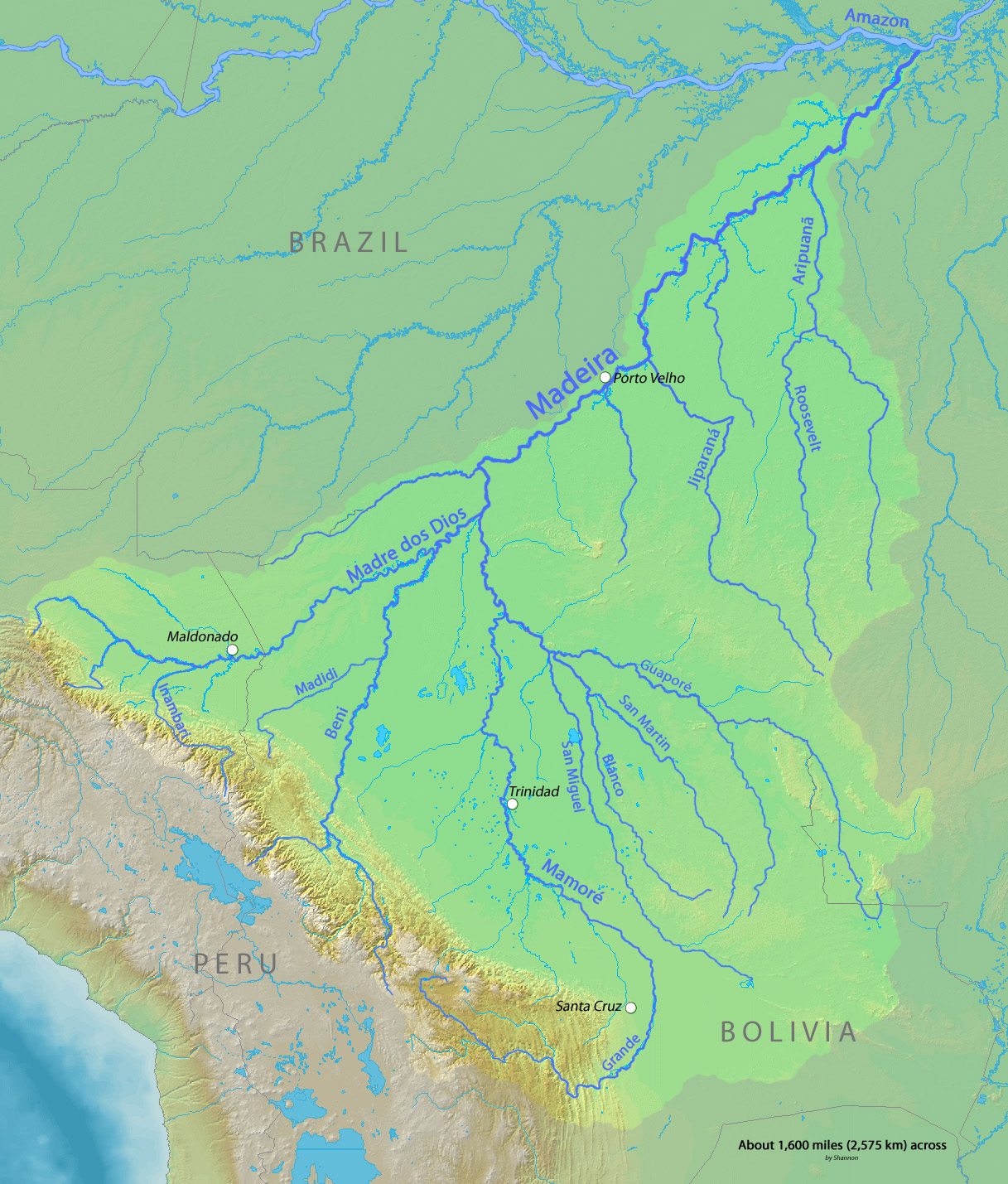
- Map of the Madeira River watershed with Madidi River in the southwest

Location
- Country: Bolivia

Physical characteristics
- Source
  - location: Bolivia
  - elevation: 1,060 m (3,480 ft)
- Mouth: Beni River
  - location: Bolivia
  - coordinates: 12°33′58″S 66°57′52″W
  - elevation: 159 m (522 ft)
- Length: 350 km (220 mi)

Madidi (Spanish pronunciation: [maˈðiði]) is a river located in the La Paz Department of Bolivia. It is a tributary of the Beni River and a part of the Amazon Basin. It runs through the Madidi National Park.
