= Tacanan languages =

Language family of Bolivia

Takanan
- Tacanan
- Geographic distribution: Bolivia
- Linguistic classification: Pano–Tacanan?: Takanan
- Subdivisions: Ese Ejja; Araona–Tacana

Language codes
- Glottolog: taca1255
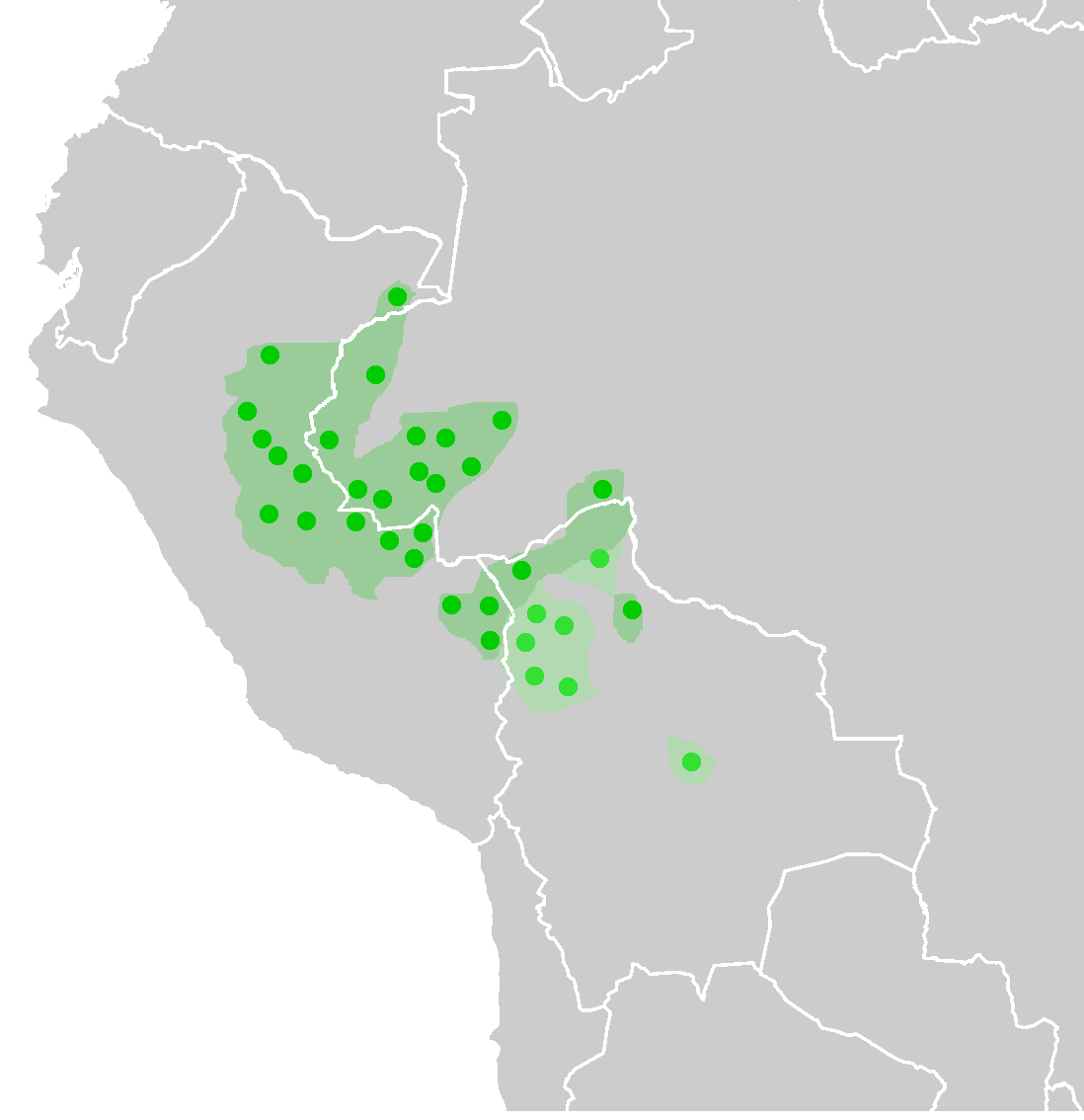
- Takanan languages (light green) and Panoan languages (dark green). Spots indicate documented locations.

Tacanan is a family of languages spoken in Bolivia, with Ese’ejja also spoken in Peru. It may be related to the Panoan languages. Many of the languages are endangered.

== Family division ==
- Tacanan
  - Ese Ejja (a.k.a. Ese’eha, Tiatinagua, Chama, Huarayo, Guacanawa, Chuncho, Eseʼexa, Tatinawa, Ese exa)
  - Araona–Tacana
    - Araona (a.k.a. Carina, Cavina)
    - Cavineña–Tacana
      - Cavineña (a.k.a. Kavinenya)
      - Tacana
        - Tacana (a.k.a. Tupamasa, Takana)
        - Reyesano (a.k.a. San Borjano, Maropa)
        - Toromona (†?)

Toromono may be extinct. Another extinct Tacanan language is Mabenaro; Arasa has been classified as Tacanan, but appears to have more in common with Panoan.

=== Loukotka (1968) ===
Below is a full list of Tacanan language varieties listed by Loukotka (1968), including names of unattested varieties.

- Tacana - language with many relationships with the Arawak and Pano languages, spoken on the Beni River, Tuichi River, and Tequeje River, territory of Colonia, Bolivia; now spoken by only a few families. Dialects are:
  - Tumupasa / Maracáni - spoken on the Uchipiamona River in the same region.
  - Isiama / Ydiama - spoken on the Unduma River and around Ydiama.
- Araona - spoken on the Madre de Dios River and Manuripi River in Colonia, Bolivia
- Capechene / Capaheni - unknown language spoken on the Xapuri River and Rosiano River, Acre territory, Brazil. (Unattested.)
- Sapiboca - extinct language once spoken at the old mission of Reyes, Beni province, Bolivia.
- Chirigua / Shiribá - extinct language once spoken at the old mission of Santa Buenaventura, Beni. (Unattested.)
- Guarizo - extinct language once spoken at the old missions of Reyes and San Antonio de Isiama.
- Maropa - spoken in the vicinity of Lake Rogoaguado, Beni, now probably extinct.
- Guacanahua / Chama / Ese'ejja - spoken by a small tribe on the Madidi River and Undumo River, La Paz province, Bolivia.
- Mabenaro - spoken on the Manuripi River.
- Caviña / Cavineña - once spoken on the Cavinas River, Madidi River, and Beni River, now probably extinct.
- Toromona - once spoken between the Madidi River, Beni River, and Madre de Dios River, now perhaps extinct.
- Arasa - language spoken by the greater part of the Arazaire tribe (of Pano stock) on the Marcopata River and Arasa River.
- Tiatinagua / Mohino / Chuncho / Huarayo / Baguaja / Tambopata-Guarayo / Echoja - spoken by a tribe on the Peru-Bolivia border, on the Tambopata River.

== Language contact ==
Jolkesky (2016) notes that there are lexical similarities with the Kayuvava, Tupi, and Arawak language families due to contact.

== Vocabulary ==
Sample vocabulary of four Tacanan languages, along with Proto-Panoan for comparison, from Nikulin (2019):

gloss	Ese Ejja	Araona	Cavineña	Tacana	Proto-Panoan
liver	e-kakʷa	tákʷa	e-takʷa	e-takʷa	*takʷa
tongue	ej-ana	e-ána	j-ana	j-ana	*hana
blood		ami	ami	ami	*himi
you (sg.)	mi-a	mi	mi-	mi	*mi
hand	e-me	e-me	e-me-tuku	e-me	*mɨ-
earth	meʃi	mezizo	metʃi ‘soil’	med’i	*mai
meat	e-jami	e-ami	e-rami	j-ami ‘muscle’	*rami
stone		mahana	makana		*maka
bone	e-sá	e-tsoa	e-tsau	e-tsau	*ʂao
(finger)nail	e-me-kiʃe	Ø-mé-tezi		e-me-tid’i	*mɨ̃-tsis
fat	e-sei	e-tsei	e-tseri	e-tsei	*ʂɨ[n]i
tooth	e-sé	e-tse	e-tse	e-tse	*ʂɨta

== Verbal morphology ==
=== Associated motion ===
Tacanan languages, in particular Cavineña and Ese Ejja, have among the richest associated motion systems in the world's languages.
