= Ese Ejja language =

Tacanan language spoken in Bolivia and Peru

Ese'ejja
- Tiatinagua
- ese'ejja
- Pronunciation: [eseʔexa]
- Native to: Bolivia, Peru
- Region: Beni Department (Bolivia), La Paz Department (Bolivia), Pando Department, (Bolivia); Department of Madre de Dios (Peru), Department of Puno, Peru
- Ethnicity: Ese Ejja people
- Native speakers: 700 (2007)
- Language family: Tacanan: Ese'ejja

Official status
- Official language in: Bolivia

Language codes
- ISO 639-3: ese
- Glottolog: esee1248
- ELP: Ese'jja

Ese Ejja (Ese'eha, Eseʼexa, Ese exa), also known as Tiatinagua (Tatinawa), is a Tacanan language of Bolivia and Peru. It is spoken by Ese Ejja people of all ages. Dialects are Guacanawa (Guarayo/Huarayo), Baguaja, Echoja, and possibly extinct Chama, Chuncho, Huanayo, Kinaki, and Mohino. Chunene is "similar" to Ese Ejja, though whether a dialect or a separate language is not clear.

== Historical, social and cultural characteristics ==
Ese Ejja is spoken in the La Paz, Beni, and Pando departments of Bolivia (in the provinces of Iturralde, Ballivián, Vaca Diez, and Madre de Dios) on the Beni and Madre de Dios rivers; and in the Madre de Dios and Puno departments of Peru. According to Alexiades & Peluso (2009), there are approximately 1,500 Ese Ejja, distributed among different communities in Peru and Bolivia. The Bolivian Ese Ejja are divided into two clans: the Quijati, around the Riberalta region; and the Hepahuatahe in the Rurenabaque region. Crevels & Muysken (2009:15) write that in Bolivia there were 518 Ese Ejja speakers (of four years of age and older), and therefore is an endangered language. Some names used to refer to the language are Ese'eha, Chama, and Warayo; Chama is a pejorative regional name, and Guarayo is also the name of a Tupí-Guaraní language group. In Peru, the Ese Ejja language (Guacanahua, Echoja, Chuncho) is spoken along the Madre de Dios and Tambopata rivers and at their sources in three locations: Sonene, Palma Real, and Infierno. Ese Ejja is also seriously threatened in Peru, with 840 speakers in an ethnic group of the same size.

== Phonology ==
Ese Ejja has 17 consonant phonemes and four vowels. A practical orthography is shown between angled brackets in the table below.

Ese Ejja has ejective consonants such as /kʼ/ as well as voiceless implosives such as /ɓ̥/.

Ese Ejja consonants
	Bilabial	Alveolar	Postalveolar	Alveo-palatal	Velar	Labiovelar	Uvular	Glottal
Voiceless plosive	p ⟨p⟩	t ⟨t⟩	t͡ʃ ⟨ch⟩		k ⟨k⟩	kʷ ~ ɡʷ ⟨kw⟩		ʔ ⟨'⟩
Voiced plosive	(b)	(d)						
Voiceless implosive	ɓ̥ ⟨b⟩	ɗ̥ ⟨d⟩						
Fricative		s ⟨s⟩	ʃ ⟨sh⟩	ɕ ~ x ~ xʷ ⟨x⟩			(χ)	h ~ ɦ ⟨j⟩
Nasal	m ~ ᵐb ⟨m⟩	n ~ ⁿd ⟨n⟩		ɲ ⟨ñ⟩				
Glide		(l)		j ⟨y⟩		w ⟨w⟩		

- Nasal sounds /m, n/ may range to prenasalized stops [ᵐb, ⁿd] in free variation in initial position, as well as be heard as voiced plosives [b, d] in free variation. [l] may also be heard as an allophone of /n/ in free variation.
- /x/ is heard as [ɕ] when in between front vowels /i, e/, and is heard as labialized [xʷ] when following /o/. Elsewhere, it is most commonly heard as uvular [χ] or velar [x].
- /ʃ/ can be palatalized as [ʃʲ] in free variation.
- /h/ may also be heard as voiced [ɦ] in free variation.
- /kʷ/ may also be heard as voiced [ɡʷ] in free variation.
- /k/ may become palatalized as [kʲ] when before or between /i, e/.
- /k/ can also be heard as an ejective [kʼ] or a uvular [q] among emphatic speech.

Ese Ejja vowels
	Front	Central	Back
High	i		
Mid	e		o
Low		a	

Three diphthongs occur: [io], [ia], and [oe]; these are represented as ⟨yo⟩, ⟨ya⟩, and ⟨we⟩ in the practical orthography to prevent confusion with vowel sequences.

Syllables have the structure (C)V.

== Bibliography ==
- Vuillermet, Marine (2012). A Grammar of Ese Ejja, a Takanan language of the Bolivian Amazon (Doctoral dissertation in Linguistics). Lyon: Université Lyon 2. Archived from the original on 2015-04-06.
  - "Resumé" [Resumé]. Marine Vuillermet (in French and English). Archived from the original on 2015-04-06.
