= Caquihuara, Madidi, Bolivia =

Rainforest area in Bolivia

Coordinates: 14°34′20″S 67°38′15″W

Caquihuara is a rainforest area along the Tuichi River in the Madidi National Park in Bolivia, west of the Bala Gorge.

The area is known for its macaws which live in holes in a tall cliff on the north bank of the Tuichi River. Caquihuara is one of the last places on earth where the red and blue macaws live.

The Tuichi River flows west–east and joins the Beni River 7 km south west of the Bala Gorge, where the Beni River breaks through a mountain range about 12 kilometres south of Rurrenabaque. (The Beni River flows from south to north).

The San Miguel del Bala Eco-Lodge has built an eco-lodge in Caquihuara, on the north side of the Tuichi River. The eco-lodge was opened in 2010. It is a supplement to the original eco-lodge near the village of San Miguel del Bala, and the new eco-lodge in Caquihuara is a base for tours in the Madidi National Park.

== See also ==
Madidi National Park
