= San Buenaventura, La Paz =

Coordinates: 14°26′5″S 67°32′27″W

- Town
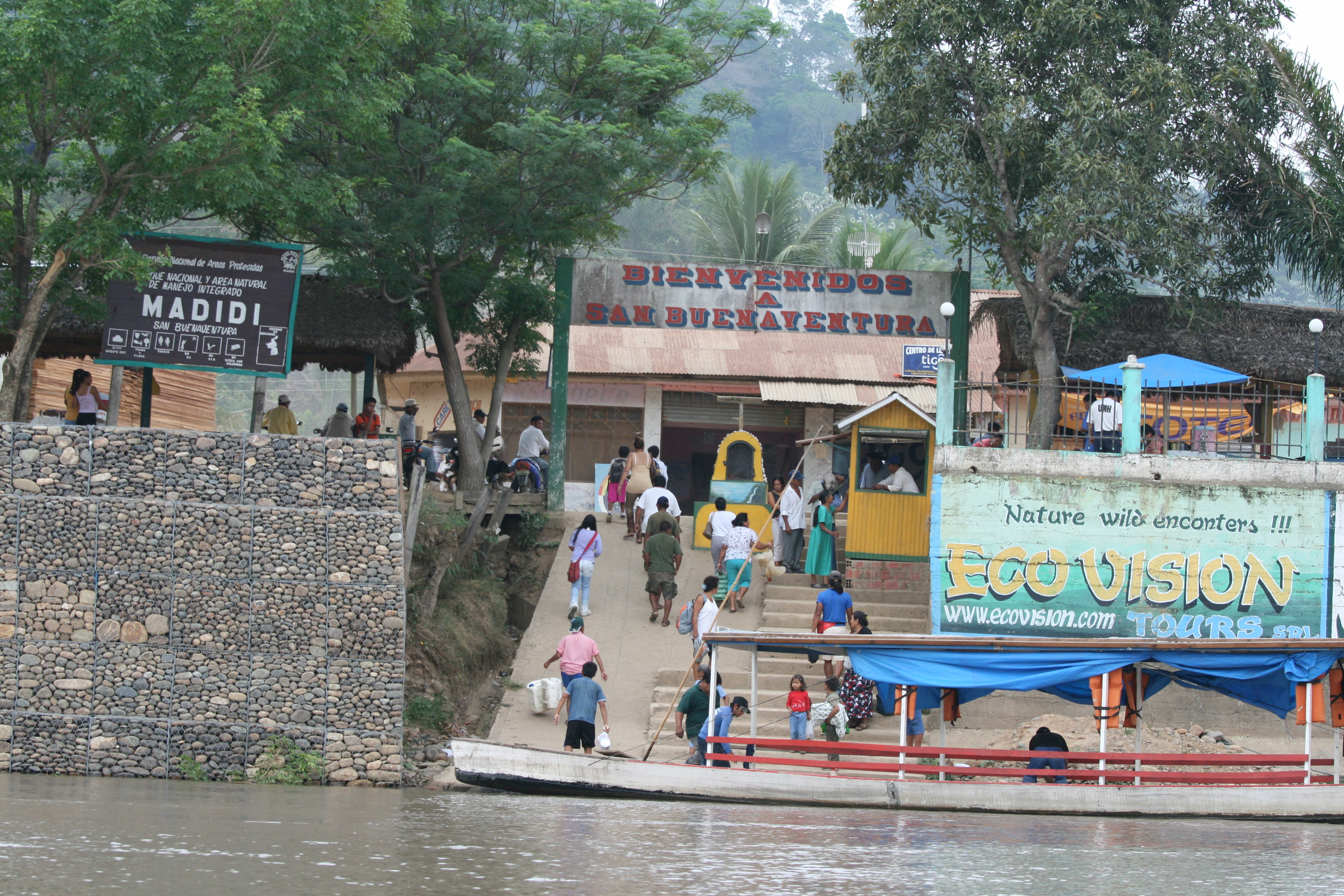
- San Buenaventura and Beni River
- Interactive map of San Buenaventura, La Paz
- Country: Bolivia
- Department: La Paz Department
- Province: Abel Iturralde Province
- Municipality: San Buenaventura Municipality

Population (2001)
  - Total: 2,264
- Time zone: UTC-4 (BOT)
- Climate: Af

San Buenaventura is a little town in northern Bolivia, on the west bank of Beni River, opposite the town Rurrenabaque on the east bank. The two towns are connected with a ferry.

The area is in the Amazon Basin, and San Buenaventura is the access to the Madidi National Park, where the local vegetation is rainforest.

San Buenaventura is in the La Paz Department, and the town is the seat of the San Buenaventura Municipality.
