= San Miguel del Bala =

Coordinates: 14°30′29″S 67°29′09″W

San Miguel del Bala is a little village in Bolivia. San Miguel del Bala is an indigenous community in the Bolivian Amazon rainforest on the banks of the Beni River, near Rurrenabaque. Its nearest neighbour is the Madidi National Park, world famous as one of the places on earth with the widest biodiversity. San Miguel del Bala is south of Rurrenabaque on the west bank of the Beni River. San Miguel is in the La Paz Department of Bolivia, while Rurrenabaque is in the Beni Department.

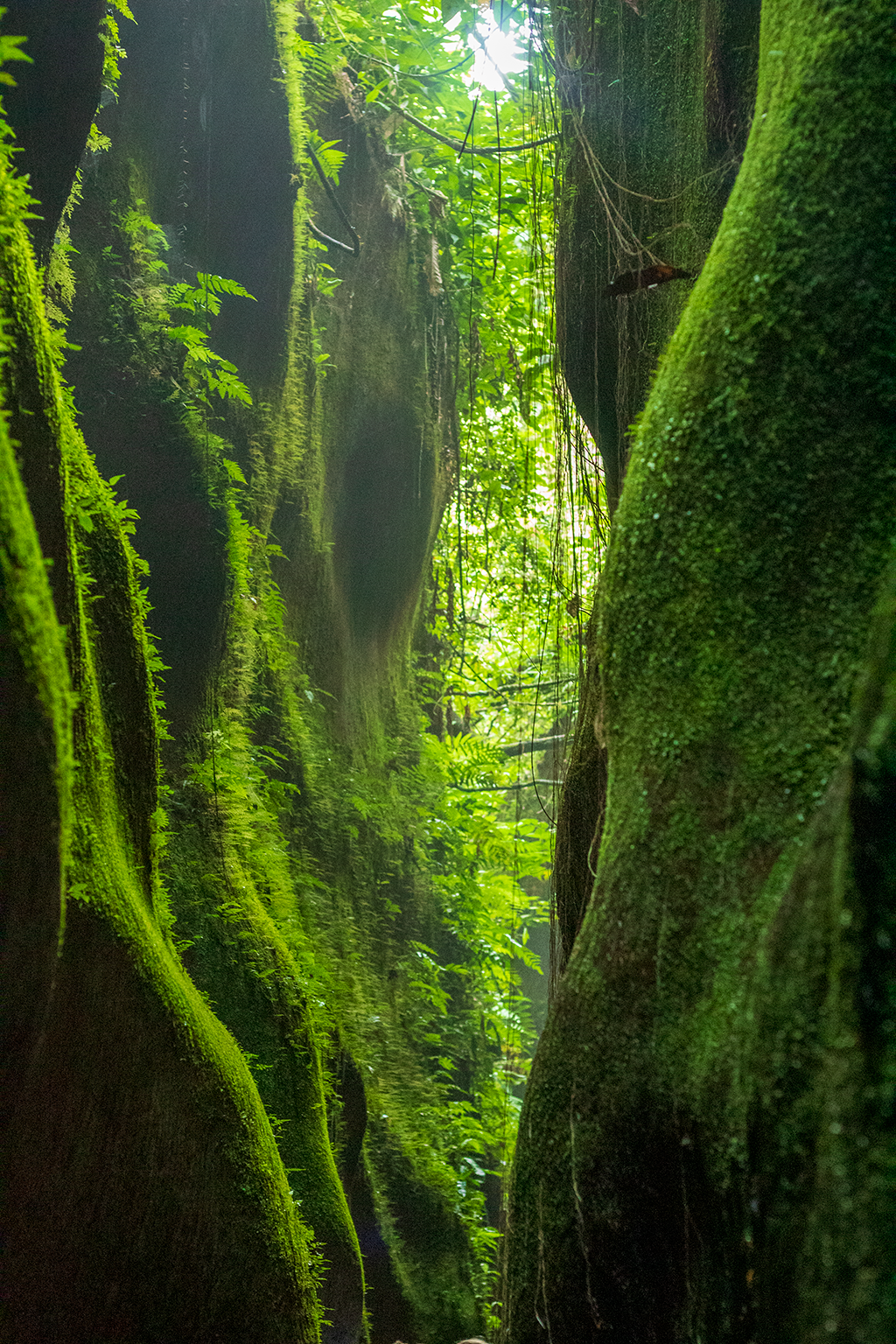

San Miguel del Bala is only reached by boat 40 minutes upstream from Rurrenabaque. The community of San Miguel has 235 inhabitants. They have built the San Miguel del Bala Eco-Lodge with the help of NGO's: CARE (CARE (relief)), Conservation International, UNDP, and Wildlife Conservation Society. The Eco-Lodge has a restaurant and 7 comfortable cabins each with 3 beds and private bathroom.

"Bala" means "bullet" or "cannon ball". The landmark is the ’shot hole’ in the nearby Mountain range that is visible from the lodge.

San Miguel is a small community of 32 families. They are Tacana Indians who have historically lived along the shores of the Beni and Tuichi rivers and within the boundaries of the famous Madidi National Park. They live in harmony with their environment and from various small commercial ventures such as handicrafts, fishing and agriculture. Now they also live from visits to their eco-tourism lodge that they have built and run themselves with the financial and technical help of local authorities and several NGOs and the United Nations Development Fund.

The inhabitants of San Miguel del Bala use the income from the community-based project to better their lives - education, health, and such - and to preserve the incredibly rich biodiversity in and around the Madidi National Park. When Madidi was created it was their biggest enemy, but tourism's many advantages to the community have completely changed their opinion. Instead of hating the national park they are now among its fiercest protectors and are proud to be nominated as honorary park rangers by the national park itself. Their way of living and the way they manage their lodge is completely sustainable and will allow their children and grandchildren to live maybe even better than they are living.
