= Conservation International Bolivia =

Country programme of Conservation International in Bolivia

- Conservación Internacional Bolivia
- Abbreviation: CI-Bolivia
- Formation: 1987
- Type: Country programme
- Headquarters: La Paz, Bolivia
- Region served: Bolivia
- Fields: Biodiversity conservation; protected areas; sustainable livelihoods; conservation finance
- Parent organization: Conservation International
- Website: bolivia.conservation.org

Conservation International Bolivia (Conservación Internacional Bolivia, CI-Bolivia) is the country programme of Conservation International in Bolivia. The programme is based in La Paz.

CI Bolivia has been involved in protected-area initiatives and conservation finance in the Bolivian Amazon, including the first debt-for-nature swap (1987). More recently, it has supported municipal protected areas in northern Bolivia such as the Área Municipal de Conservación y Manejo del Bajo Madidi in Ixiamas and the Área Natural de Manejo Integrado El Gran Manupare in El Sena, Pando Department. In 2025, it supported additional municipal protected-area initiatives in La Paz Department and Pando departments, including the Parque Municipal y Área Natural de Manejo Integrado Gran Paitití de Mapiri and the Bosques para Siempre project in Pando. Peer-reviewed studies of land-use change in Bolivia have acknowledged Conservation International Bolivia for data contributions, and CI Bolivia-affiliated researchers have co-authored work on deforestation-related carbon emissions.

== Overview ==
CI Bolivia's work has included technical support linked to municipal protected areas and protected-area management in the Bolivian Amazon, including Bajo Madidi in La Paz Department and Gran Manupare in Pando Department. Work associated with Bajo Madidi has included activities linked to sustainable production and livelihoods based on forest resources such as Brazil nuts (castaña). The programme has also been linked to conservation-finance mechanisms, including the 1987 debt-for-nature swap and later protected-area financing initiatives. Other initiatives have included technical support for municipal protected areas in La Paz and Pando departments, including Gran Paitití de Mapiri and the Los Palmares de Villa Nueva and Guardián Amazónico Pacahuara areas in Pando. CI Bolivia has also collaborated with research institutions on policy-analysis tools related to deforestation and livelihoods, including the SimPachamama simulation tool. SimPachamama combines a role-playing game with a computer simulation to explore how policy packages might affect land use, deforestation and livelihoods in the Bolivian Amazon.

Peer-reviewed studies of land-use change in the Bolivian lowlands have used CI Bolivia deforestation datasets for analyses of deforestation drivers and the expansion of mechanized agriculture. A carbon-bookkeeping analysis of deforestation in Bolivia during 1990–2000 and 2000–2010 included an author affiliated with Conservation International–Bolivia.

== History ==
Conservation International's programme in Bolivia dates to 1987.

In 1987, Conservation International helped implement the first debt-for-nature swap in Bolivia.

In 2013, CI Bolivia collaborated with research institutions to develop SimPachamama, a game and computer simulation used to explore policy options related to deforestation and livelihoods in the Bolivian Amazon.

In the municipality of Ixiamas (La Paz Department), the Área Municipal de Conservación y Manejo del Bajo Madidi was created on 29 May 2019 and covers about 1,535,495 ha (15,354.95 km^{2}). Conservation International provided technical support for the creation of the area.

In January 2024, the municipality of El Sena in Pando Department created the Área Natural de Manejo Integrado El Gran Manupare, establishing a protected area of 452,639 ha (4,526.39 km^{2}). Conservation International Bolivia supported the process alongside municipal and local partners.

In 2025, municipal protected areas were established in the municipality of Mapiri (La Paz Department) and in the municipalities of Villa Nueva and Santos Mercado (Pando) with technical support from CI Bolivia and partner organisations.

== Programmes and operations ==
Selected programme locations in Bolivia (1 La Paz, 2 Beni Biosphere Reserve, 3 El Sena (Pando), and 4 Ixiamas (La Paz))

The programme has been associated with initiatives in the following locations:

=== La Paz ===
The programme works with government and Indigenous partners on protected areas and community livelihoods in the Bolivian Amazon.

In the municipality of Ixiamas (La Paz Department), the Área Municipal de Conservación y Manejo del Bajo Madidi was created on 29 May 2019 and covers about 1,535,495 ha (15,354.95 km^{2}). Bajo Madidi has been described as the largest municipal protected area in Bolivia. The protected area was established under Ixiamas Municipal Autonomous Law No. 0151/2019. Conservation International provided technical support for the creation of the area. Communities in the area include Tacana and Araona Indigenous peoples and migrants, and livelihoods include the collection of Brazil nuts and other non-timber forest products. CI Bolivia has supported sustainable production activities in communities in the Bajo Madidi area, including Indigenous communities.

In Mapiri (La Paz Department), the municipal government created the Parque Municipal y Área Natural de Manejo Integrado Gran Paitití de Mapiri, covering about 83,835 ha (838.35 km^{2}); CI Bolivia provided technical support and worked with local communities and the Red TUSOCO alliance.

=== Beni ===
The 1987 debt-for-nature swap supported conservation funding in the Beni region, including the Beni Biosphere Reserve (about 133,500 ha (1,335 km^{2})) and three additional reserves totalling about 1,497,000 ha (14,970 km^{2}).

=== Pando ===
In Pando Department, the municipality of El Sena created the Área Natural de Manejo Integrado El Gran Manupare, covering 452,639 ha (4,526.39 km^{2}). The reserve's creation followed studies by entities including the Sena City Council, the Center for Research and Promotion of Campesinos (CIPCA) and Conservation International Bolivia, with financial support from international organisations. Gran Manupare connects with nearby conservation areas in northern Bolivia, including the Manuripi-Heath Amazonian Wildlife National Reserve and the Área Municipal de Conservación y Manejo del Bajo Madidi in Ixiamas.

CI Bolivia has also implemented the Bosques para Siempre project in Pando, together with Conservación Amazónica–ACEAA, supporting municipal protected areas including Área Natural de Manejo Integrado Los Palmares de Villa Nueva and Área Natural de Manejo Integrado Guardián Amazónico Pacahuara.

Gran Manupare supports forest-based livelihoods for local communities, including Brazil nut harvesting and açaí cultivation. The protected area is estimated to safeguard about 9.2 million metric tons of irrecoverable carbon. The protected area has also faced pressures from illegal gold mining along the Madre de Dios River and concerns about potential logging, including of high-value timber species such as mahogany.

Programme landscapes of Conservation International Bolivia
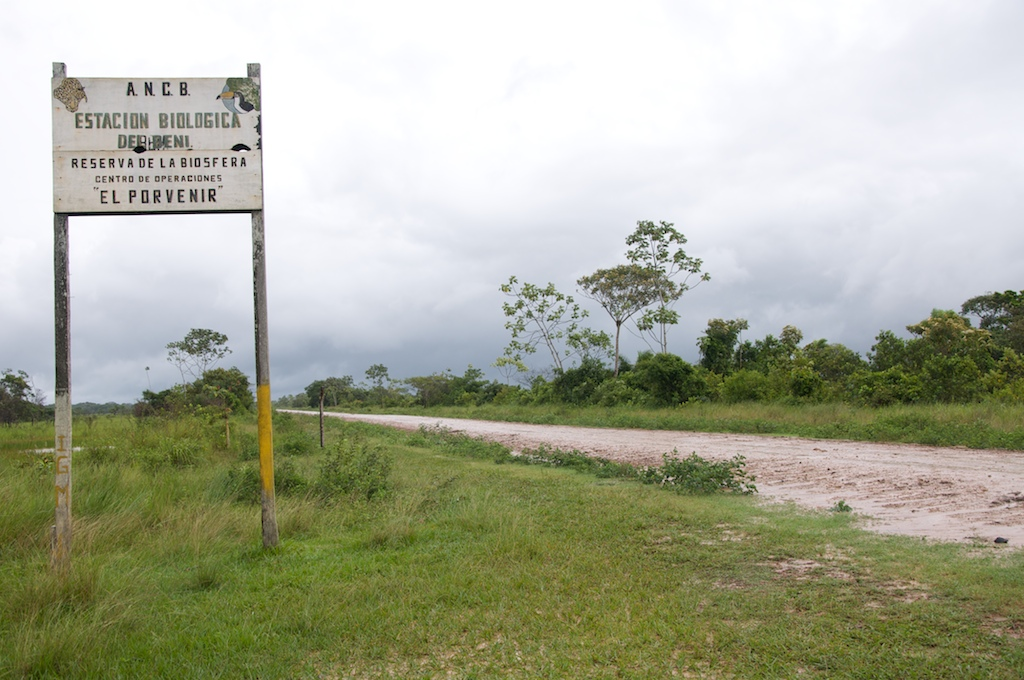
Beni Biosphere Reserve

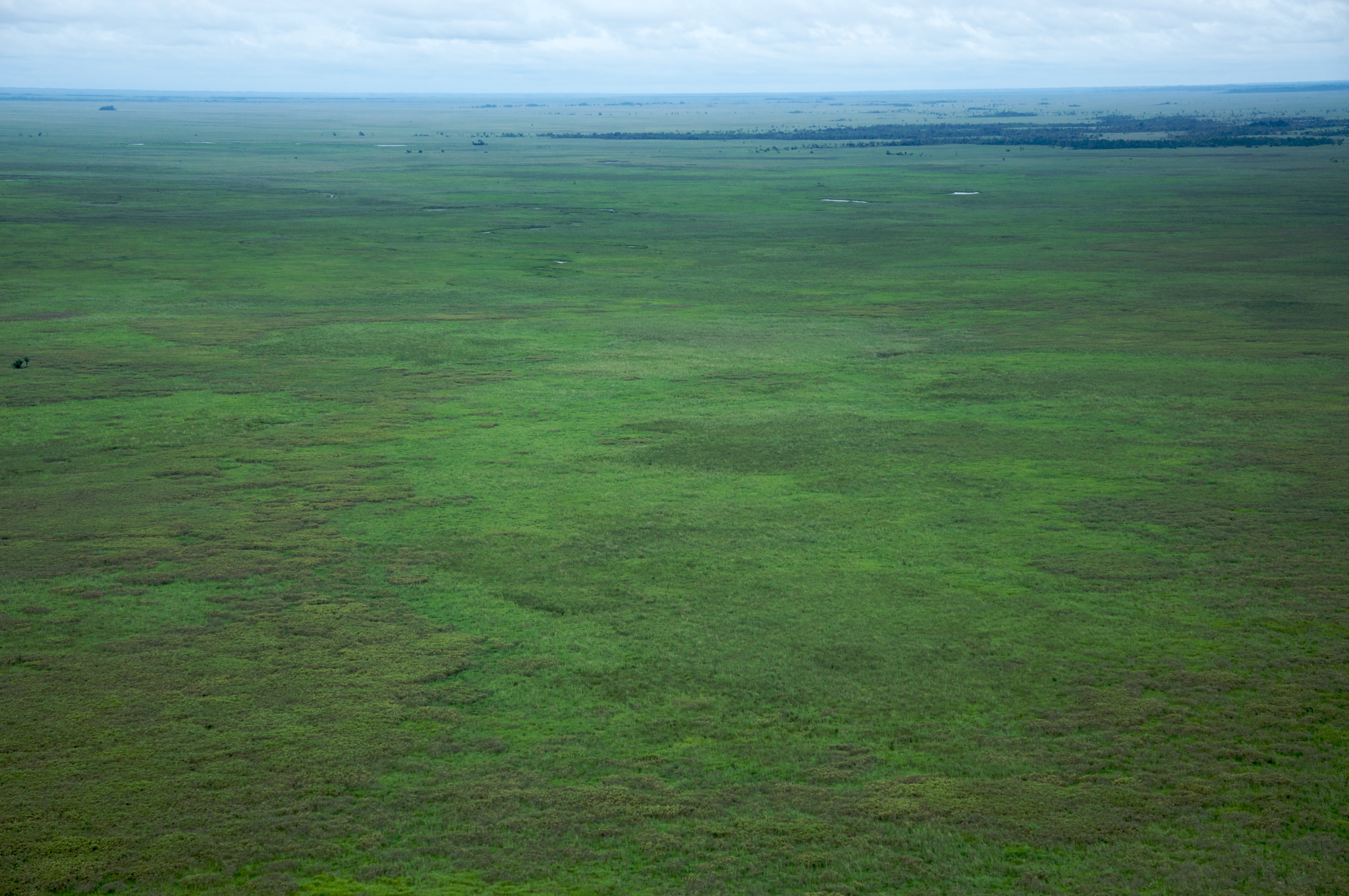
Beni Biosphere Reserve

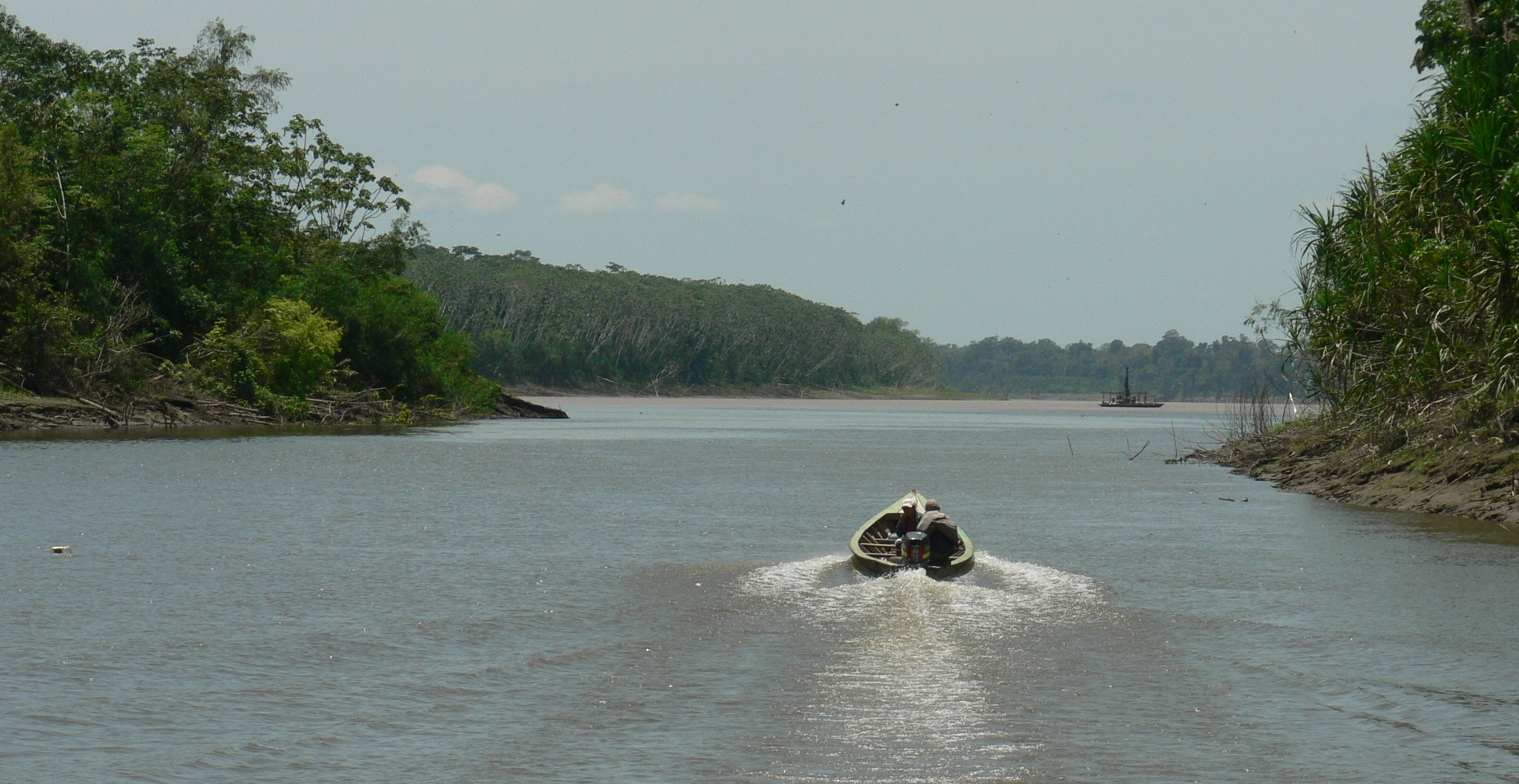
Gran Manupare

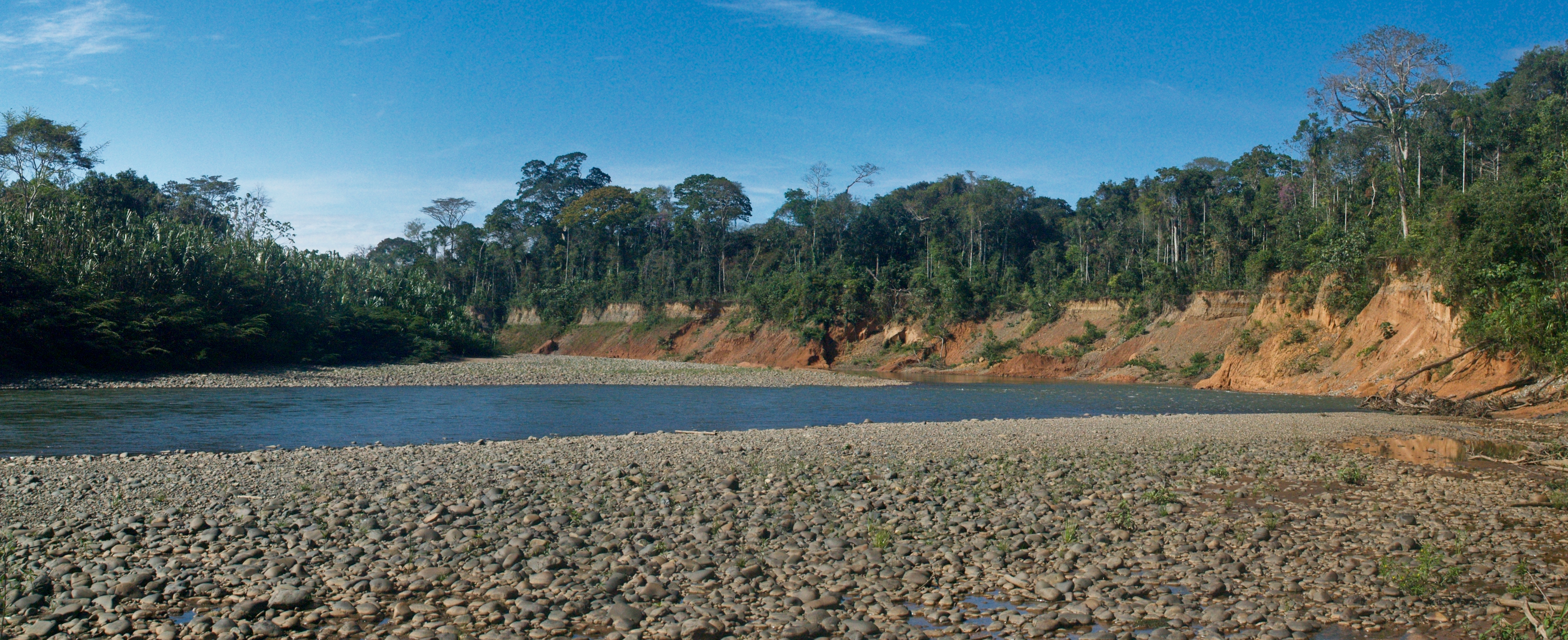
Bajo Madidi

== Partnerships ==
CI Bolivia has worked with municipal governments and local organisations on municipal protected areas in the Bolivian Amazon. In Ixiamas (La Paz Department), the Autonomous Municipal Government of Ixiamas is responsible for the Área Municipal de Conservación y Manejo del Bajo Madidi, and the protected area's creation received technical support from Conservation International; a Conservation Strategy Fund financing project for the area listed partners including Conservation International and the Andes Amazon Fund. In El Sena, Pando Department, the municipality created the Área Natural de Manejo Integrado El Gran Manupare with support from a local alliance that included AMDEPANDO, the Center for Research and Promotion of Campesinos (CIPCA) and local community organisations, with Conservation International Bolivia providing technical support. CI Bolivia has also coordinated with municipal authorities and AMDEPANDO on land-use planning instruments and a network of municipal protected areas.

Other partnerships include the Municipal Government of Mapiri and the Red TUSOCO alliance for the Gran Paitití de Mapiri municipal protected area, and cooperation with Conservación Amazónica–ACEAA through the Bosques para Siempre project in Pando. CI Bolivia has also collaborated with research organisations including the Instituto de Estudios Avanzados en Desarrollo (INESAD) on the SimPachamama deforestation and poverty simulation tool.

CI Bolivia's conservation-finance work has also involved partnerships with government agencies and financial institutions, including the Bolivian government and the United States Agency for International Development in the context of the 1987 debt-for-nature swap.

== Funding and conservation finance ==
Debt-for-nature swaps are a form of debt conversion used to generate domestic funding earmarked for conservation, typically by purchasing external debt at a discount and exchanging it for local-currency commitments dedicated to conservation programmes and protected-area management. The 1987 Bolivia debt-for-nature swap involved Conservation International purchasing US$650,000 of Bolivian debt owed to Citicorp for US$100,000. The swap generated local-currency conservation funding, including contributions linked to the United States Agency for International Development (USAID) and the Bolivian government, and supported reserve-management arrangements in the Beni region. The transaction set aside the Beni Biosphere Reserve (about 133,500 ha (1,335 km^{2})) and supported the establishment of three additional reserves totalling about 1,497,000 ha (14,970 km^{2}). The swap generated domestic controversy over sovereignty, but it did not involve a transfer of land ownership. Implementation disputes included questions around the enforcement of forestry concessions and Indigenous access rights in parts of the Chimane Forest Reserve area.

Analyses of climate and conservation finance have continued to discuss debt-for-nature (and "debt-for-climate") swaps as a mechanism for funding environmental objectives, often citing the Bolivia transaction as an early example.

A Conservation Strategy Fund financing analysis for the Área Municipal de Conservación y Manejo del Bajo Madidi discussed management-financing options including a trust fund (fideicomiso), user fees or tariffs linked to Brazil-nut (castaña) transport and tourism, and corporate social responsibility contributions.

The Gran Manupare initiative formed part of the Our Future Forests – Vital Reserves project, supported by the French Ministry for Europe and Foreign Affairs and the Andes Amazon Fund, among other donors. The Bosques para Siempre project in Pando has been supported by donors including the Andes Amazon Fund, Rainforest Trust, the Embassy of Sweden and the European Union. Support for the Gran Paitití de Mapiri municipal protected area has included funding from the Andes Amazon Fund and Rainforest Trust and support from the Wyss Foundation.

== Impact and evaluation ==
Implementation summaries of the 1987 debt-for-nature swap included measures intended to strengthen legal protection for the Beni Biosphere Reserve and adjacent conservation areas (including the Yacuma Regional Park and the Cordeveni water basin), establish an additional buffer zone for sustained development and use in parts of the Chimane Forest Reserve, and create an operational fund (US$250,000) to support programmes in the reserve and buffer zone. The transaction was politically contentious in Bolivia but did not involve a transfer of land ownership; implementation discussions also noted delays in government payments, an additional local-currency contribution from USAID, and disputes over the allocation of forestry concessions and Indigenous access in the Chimane forest reserve.

A 2024 evaluation of a 2022–2025 forest-conservation project associated with CI Bolivia highlighted reported outcomes including strengthened inter-institutional coordination and capacities at municipal and departmental levels, an operational network of municipal protected areas with a work agenda, and the establishment of the Área Natural de Manejo Integrado El Gran Manupare (452,639 ha (4,526.39 km^{2})), alongside conservation agreements covering 5,115 ha (51.15 km^{2}) in Zongo. The evaluation also identified challenges including frequent turnover of municipal and departmental authorities affecting coordination and continuity of processes.

A financing strategy for the Área Municipal de Conservación y Manejo del Bajo Madidi assessed recurrent management costs and proposed a staged package of revenue mechanisms, including a trust fund (fideicomiso), fee systems linked to Brazil-nut production and tourism, potential carbon-credit revenue and corporate social-responsibility contributions, together with revenue projections and an implementation roadmap.

Peer-reviewed studies of land-use change in the Bolivian lowlands have used CI Bolivia deforestation datasets to analyse deforestation drivers and the expansion of mechanised agriculture, and analyses of deforestation-related carbon emissions have included authors affiliated with Conservation International Bolivia.
