= Bala Gorge (Bolivia) =

Gorge in Rurrenabaque, Bolivia

Coordinates: 14°32′44″S 67°29′55″W

The Bala Gorge (in Spanish 'Angosto del Bala' (or 'Estrecho del Bala')) in Bolivia is where the Beni River breaks through the Bala Mountain Range (in Spanish 'Serranía del Bala') about 12 kilometres south of Rurrenabaque in Bolivia. (The Beni River flows from south to north).

The Bala Gorge is in the Bolivian Amazon rainforest and the west side of the Gorge is in the Madidi National Park. The boundary of the Park follows the Bala Mountain Range towards the west and the Beni River towards the south. (The Park is south of the Mountain Range and west of the River).

A hydroelectric dam project in the Bala Gorge has been proposed (about the year 1998). It has been given up, but the idea came up again in 2007.

"Bala" means "bullet" or "cannon ball". The landmark "Bala" is the 'shot hole' in the Bala Mountain Range a little west of the Bala Gorge.

The most notable view of the Bala Gorge (and the 'shot hole' Bala landmark) is from the north side, seen upstream from the Beni River, when passing the San Miguel del Bala Eco-Lodge, situated 3 kilometres north of the Bala Gorge.

In 1971-1972 D. Sommer and his wife, evangelical missionaries, lived in a house at the foot of the mountain south west of the Gorge, in one of the areas where an indigenous group called the Ese Ejja lived at that time. The missionaries built a house out of jungle materials, but had to move away due to health problems, and later the house was destroyed when the river flooded.
