= RBQ =

RBQ may refer to:

- Round Britain Quiz, a panel game that has been broadcast on BBC Radio since 1947
- Rurrenabaque Airport (IATA airport code RBQ), Bolivia
