= Reyes, Bolivia =

Reyes
- Town and municipality
- Location of Reyes city in Bolivia
- Coordinates: 14°17′45″S 67°20′07″W
- Country: Bolivia
- Department: Beni Department
- Province: José Ballivián Province
- Elevation: 620 ft (190 m)

Population (2010)
  - Total: 8,824
- Time zone: UTC-4 (BOT)

Reyes is the city capital of the José Ballivián Province in the Beni Department of northern Bolivia and as well as of the Reyes Municipality.

== History ==
The Jesuit mission of Santos Reyes was founded in 1706. Maropa Indians resided at the mission.

== Infrastructure ==
Reyes is 24 kilometres (15 mi) northeast of Rurrenabaque, and flights to Rurrenabaque may be weather diverted to Reyes Airport.

Reyes has recently become a tourist stop before proceeding to Rurrenabaque.
