= Tuichi River =

Coordinates: 14.35°S 67.95°W

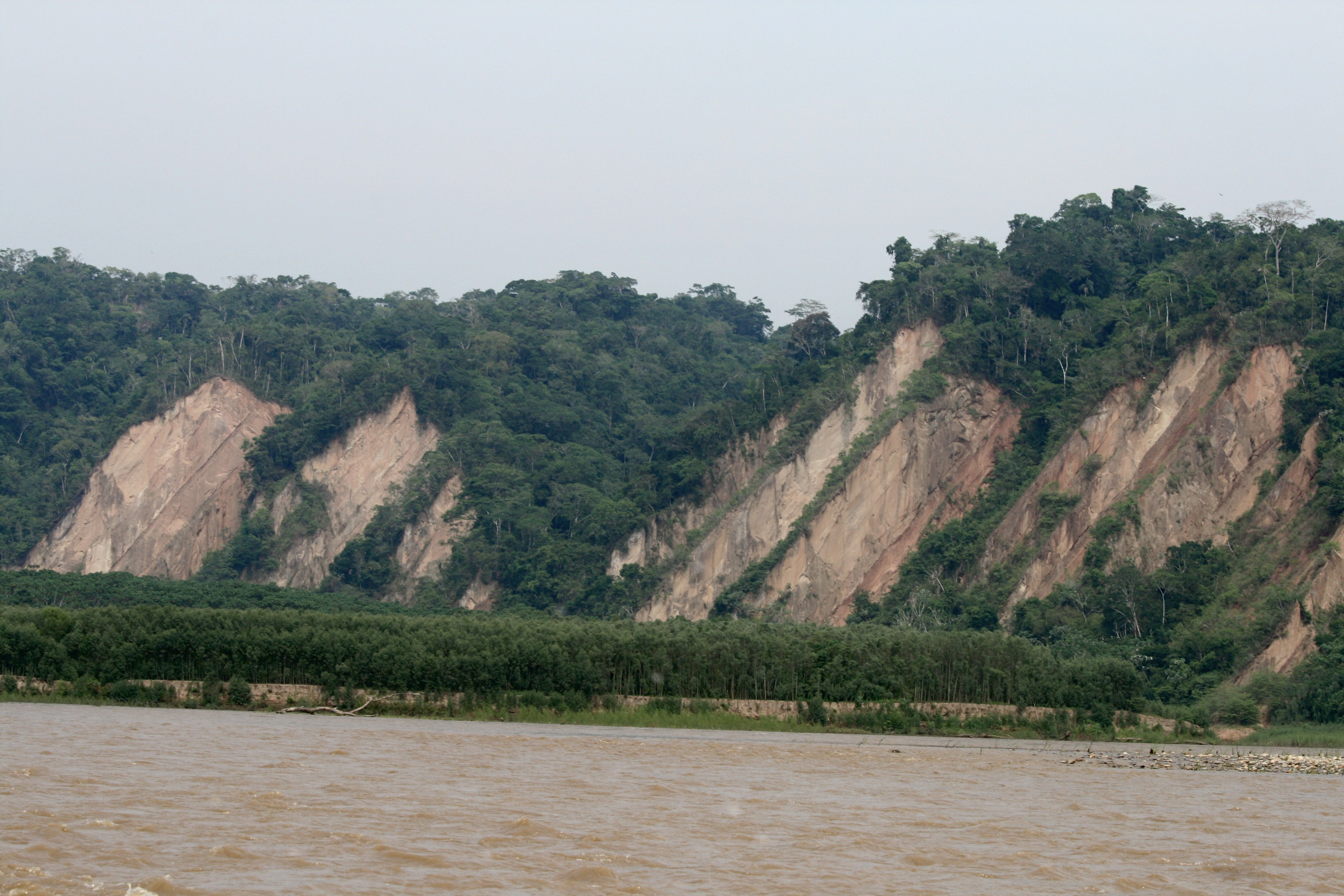
- Cliffs along Tuichi River, Madidi National Park

Location
- Country: Bolivia
- Region: La Paz Department
- Municipality: Franz Tamayo Province, Abel Iturralde Province

Physical characteristics
- Mouth: Beni River

The Tuichi River (in Spanish Río Tuichi) is a river in the Madidi National Park in the north of Bolivia. The Tuichi flows through the rainforest and joins the Beni River upstream from the town of Rurrenabaque.

== See also ==
- Madidi River
