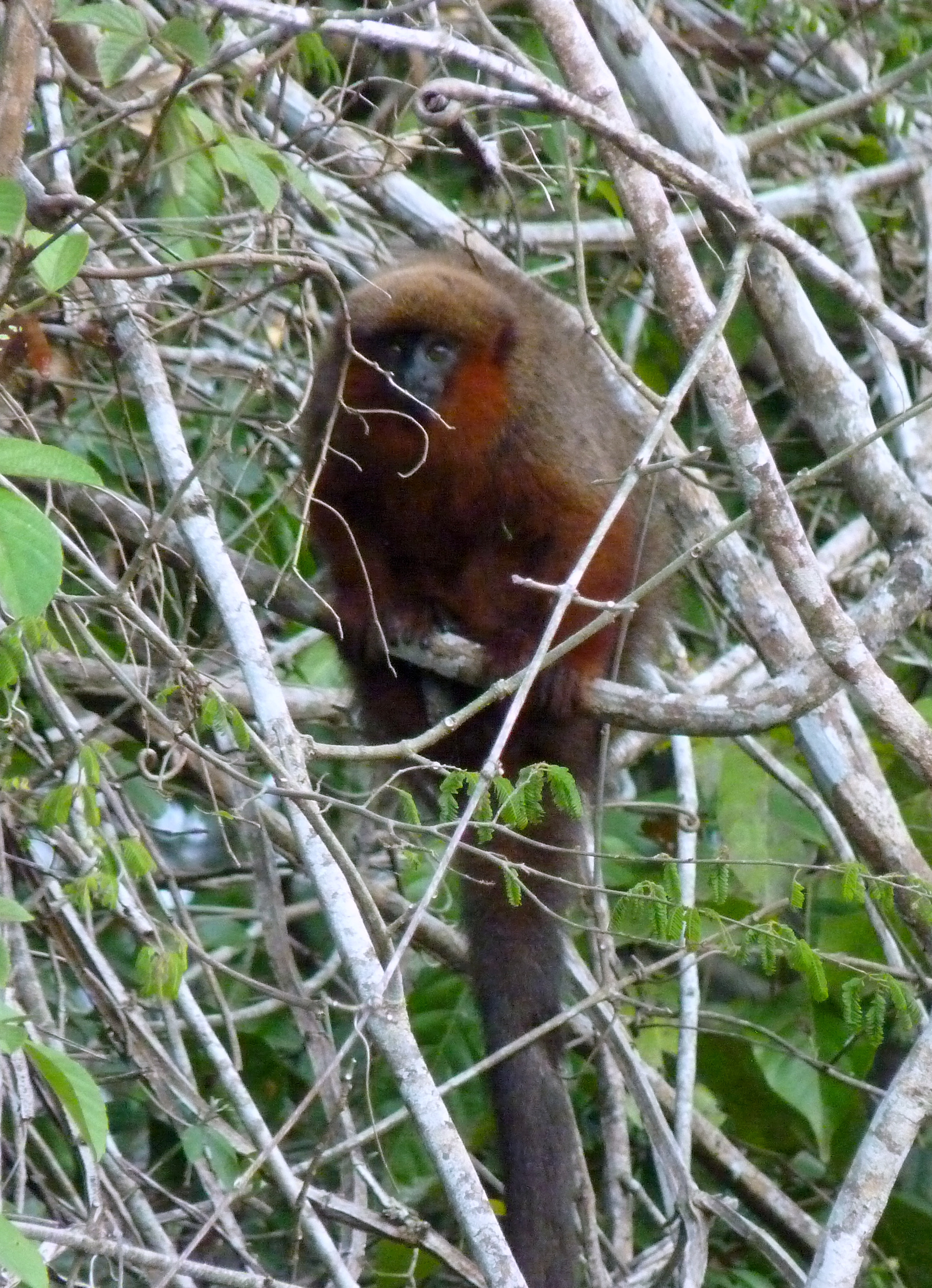

Conservation status
- Least Concern (IUCN 3.1)

Scientific classification
- Kingdom: Animalia
- Phylum: Chordata
- Class: Mammalia
- Infraclass: Placentalia
- Order: Primates
- Family: Pitheciidae
- Genus: Plecturocebus
- Species: P. aureipalatii

Binomial name
- Plecturocebus aureipalatii (Wallace, Gómez, A. M. Felton, & A. Felton, 2006)

Synonyms
- Callicebus aureipalatii Wallace, Gómez, A. M. Felton, & A. Felton, 2006

= Madidi titi monkey =

Madidi titi

Species of New World monkey

The Madidi titi monkey, also known as the GoldenPalace.com monkey or the golden palace monkey, is a titi, a kind of New World monkey, discovered in western Bolivia's Madidi National Park in 2004. Its scientific name is Plecturocebus aureipalatii, the specific epithet meaning "of the Golden Palace", in reference to GoldenPalace.com, an online casino. The casino paid US$650,000 to have the species named after it, with benefits going toward the nonprofit organization that maintains the park where the titi was discovered.

== Distribution ==
The species was discovered in low-lying lands of northwestern Bolivia, in the forest at the foot of the Andes. Studies indicate that it inhabits the western bank of the river Beni. The extension to the east and north of its range is not known. Preliminary studies indicate that the species is not endemic to Bolivia, with habitats that may extend to the south of Peru (at least to the Tambopata River).

== Description ==
The Madidi titi has orange-brown fur, a characteristic golden crown, a white tip to its tail, and dark red hands and feet. Like other titis, it is monogamous, mating for life. A pair maintains a territory against rival pairs primarily through territorial calling. The male usually carries the infants until they can survive on their own.

Madidi titis rest during 61% of the day.

== Discovery ==
British biologist Robert Wallace of the Wildlife Conservation Society and the Bolivian biologist Humberto Gómez first spotted the monkey in 2000 when studying the animals of Madidi National Park. It became the first primate species discovered in Bolivia in the last 60 years when it was recognized as a new species in 2006. The field expedition team, consisting of Annika M. Felton, Adam Felton, and Ernesto Cáceres, were the first researchers to film and record this species, previously unknown to science. Rather than choosing a name themselves, Wallace, his team, and WCS auctioned off the naming rights to raise funds for FUNDESNAP (Fundación para el Desarrollo del Sistema Nacional de Áreas Protegidas), the nonprofit organization that maintains Madidi National Park. The online casino GoldenPalace.com, one of over a dozen bidders, paid US$650,000 to have the species named after it.
