= José Ballivián Province =

Coordinates: 14.000°S 67.000°W

José Ballivián
- Province
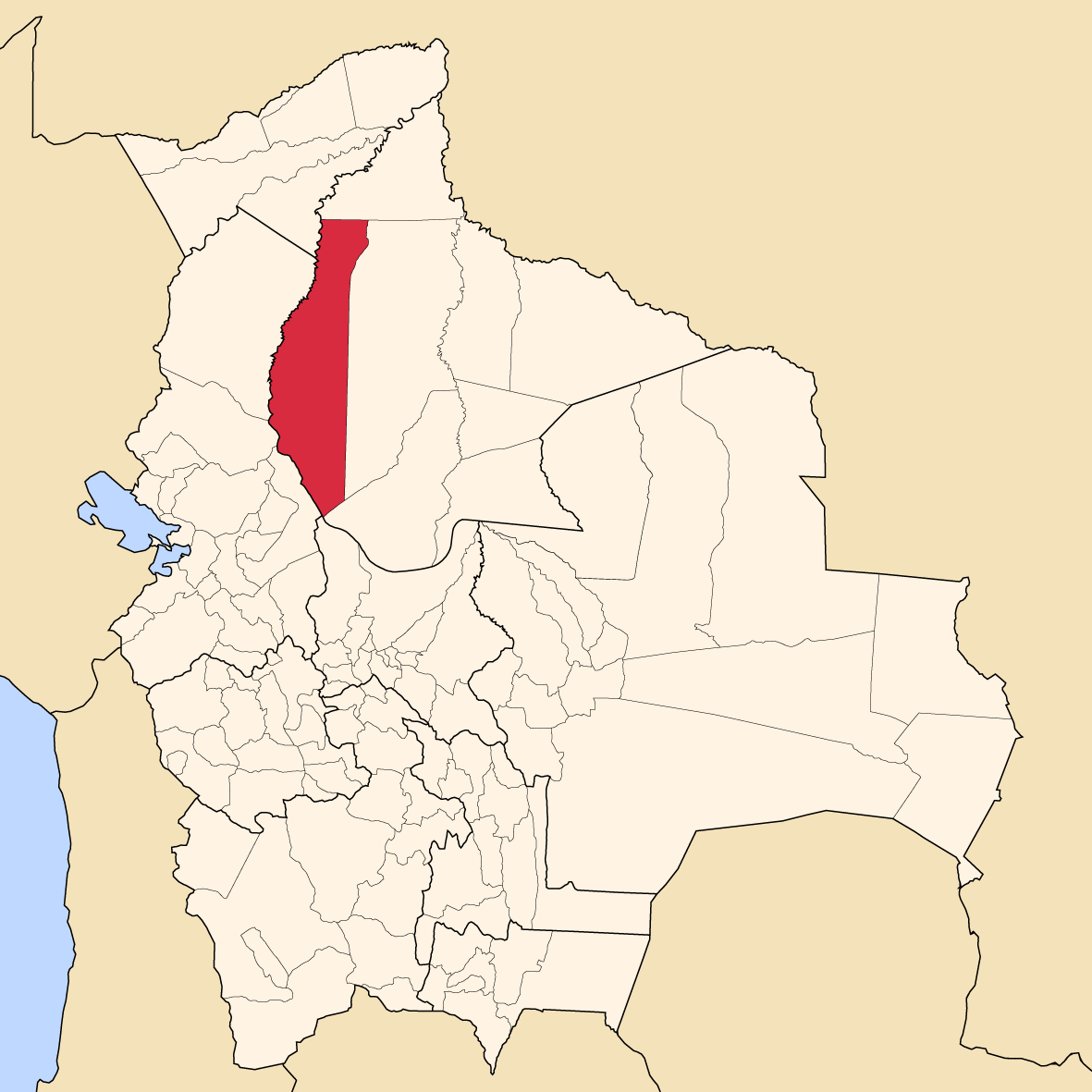
- Location of José Ballivián in Bolivia

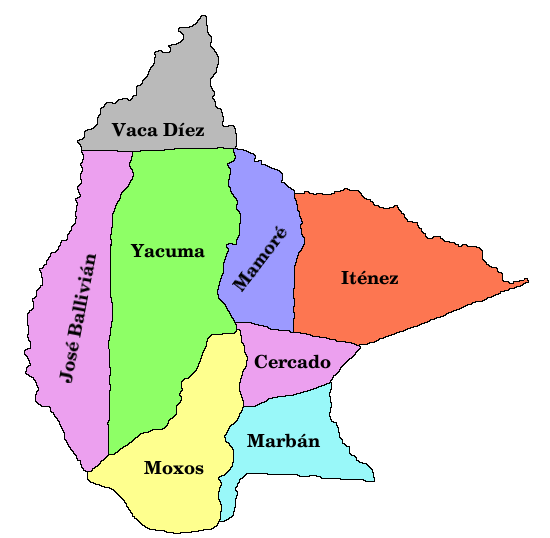
- Location of José Ballivián in Beni
- Country: Bolivia
- Department: Beni
- Seat: Santos Reyes
- Settlements: Municipalities: Reyes; San Borja; Santa Rosa; Rurrenabaque

Area
  - Total: 15,616 sq mi (40,444 km^{2})

Population (2024 census)
  - Total: 88,764
  - Density: 5.6843/sq mi (2.1947/km^{2})
- Time zone: UTC-4 (BOT)

José Ballivián is a province of the Beni Department in northern Bolivia. It is named for José Ballivián, a general and former president of Bolivia who lived from 1805 until 1852. The province has a north-south extent. To the west the province is bounded by the Beni River (with the La Paz Department on the west (left) bank), to the east it borders on the Yacuma Province of the Beni Department.

The capital of the José Ballivián is Reyes (Reyes, Bolivia). Other towns in the province are San Borja, Rurrenabaque and Santa Rosa.

The province is sparsely populated. According to Instituto Nacional de Estadística de Bolivia the population in 2001 was 68,000, of this 38,000 in urban area and 30,000 in rural area.

Using Rurrenabaque as the starting point the pampas east of Reyes (Reyes, Bolivia) with its rich wildlife is a popular destination. Rurrenabaque is also the point of access to the 'jungle', la 'selva', that is the rain forest west and south of Rurrenabaque, with the Madidi National Park known for its great biodiversity. Crossing the Beni River to Rurrenabaque means going from the Beni Department to the La Paz Department of Bolivia.

== Places of interest ==
- Beni Biological Station Biosphere Reserve
- Pilón Lajas Biosphere Reserve and Communal Lands
