= Reyes Airport =

- IATA: REY; ICAO: SLRY

Summary
- Airport type: Public
- Serves: Reyes, Bolivia
- Elevation AMSL: 597 ft / 182 m
- Coordinates: 14°18′20″S 67°21′14″W

Map
- Location of Reyes Airport in Bolivia

Runways
Direction	Length		Surface
Direction	m	ft	Surface
01/19	1,440	4,724	Grass
- Source: Landings.com Google Maps GCM

Reyes Airport Spanish: Aeropuerto de Reyes, (IATA: REY, ICAO: SLRY) is an airport serving Reyes, the capital of the José Ballivián Province in Bolivia's Beni Department. The runway is 2 kilometres (1.2 mi) west of the town.

The Reyes non-directional beacon (Ident: REY) is located on the field.

== See also ==
- Transport in Bolivia
- List of airports in Bolivia
