= Madidi National Park =

National park in Bolivia

- IUCN category II (national park)
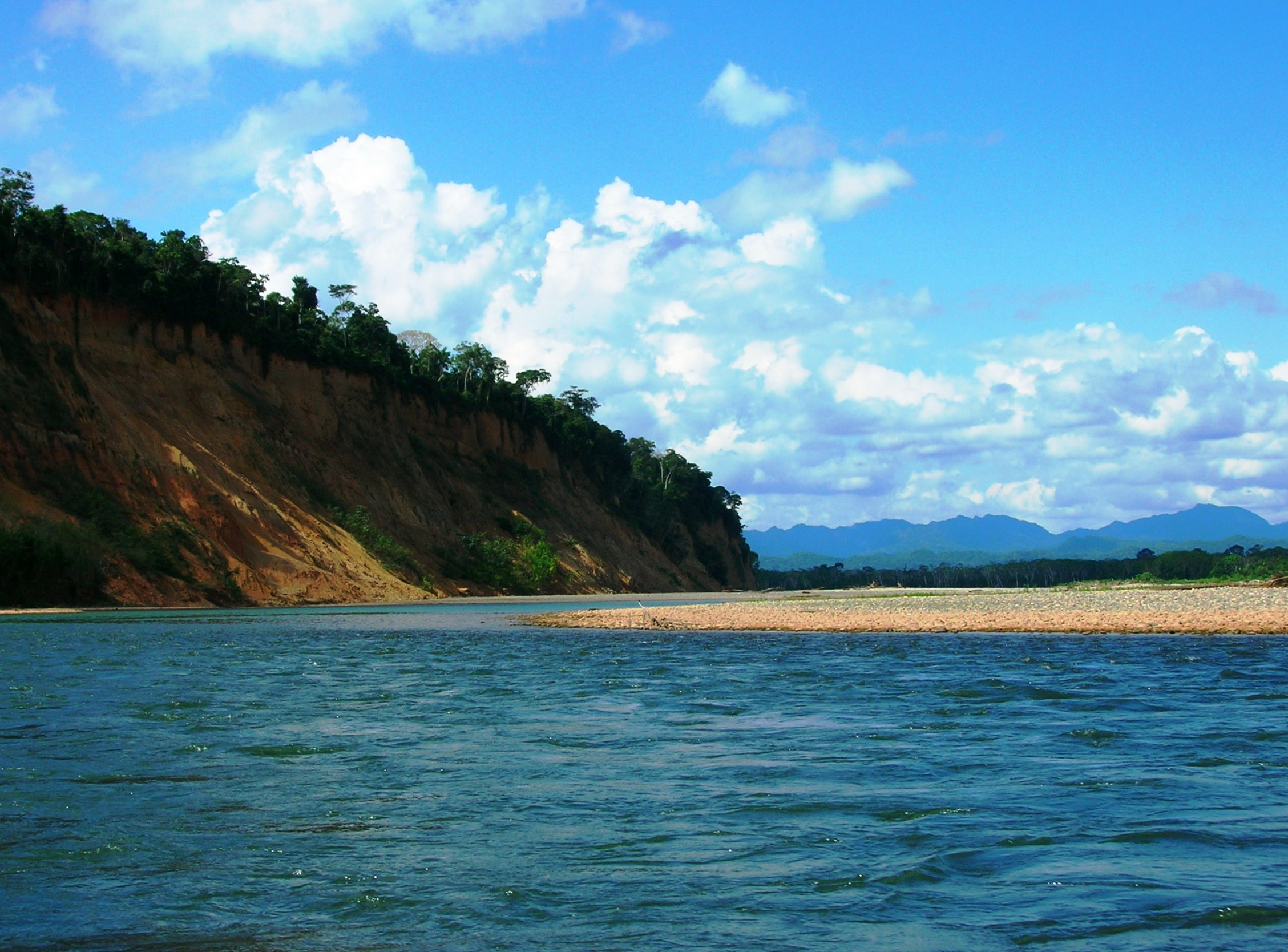
- Madidi National Park, Bolivia

- Location within Bolivia
- Location: La Paz, Bolivia
- Nearest city: Rurrenabaque, Beni
- Coordinates: 13°48′0″S 67°38′0″W
- Area: 18,957.5 km^{2}
- Established: September 21, 1995
- Governing body: SERNAP Servicio Nacional de Áreas Protegidas

Madidi National Park (Spanish pronunciation: [maˈðiði]) is a national park in the upper Amazon River basin in Bolivia. It was established in 1995 with a total land area of 18,958 km^{2} (approximately 11,779 sq mi). Together with the nearby (though not all contiguous) protected areas Manuripi-Heath and Apolobamba and the Manu Biosphere Reserve (Peru), Madidi is part of one of the largest protected areas in the world.

Ranging from the Andes Mountains to the rainforests of the Tuichi River, Madidi was recognized in 2018 by the Wildlife Conservation Society as the world's most biologically diverse national park. Madidi extends to protect parts of the Bolivian Yungas and Bolivian montane dry forests ecoregions.

Madidi National Park is accessible from San Buenaventura by crossing the Beni River via passenger ferry from Rurrenabaque.

The local inhabitants, many of whom migrated from the Andean highlands, speak the Quechua language. The park is home to indigenous groups including the Tacanan-speaking Tacana and Ese Ejja, the closely related Tsimané and Mosetén, and the voluntarily isolated Toromona.

Ecolodges are found in and around Madidi National Park. The oldest and most well-known is Chalalan Ecolodge, situated in Chalalán on the Tuichi River, a community-based enterprise that generates economic benefits for indigenous communities.

== Location ==
Madidi National Park (NP) and Integrated Management Natural Area (IMNA) is located in the northwest region of the Department of La Paz, in the provinces Franz Tamayo, Iturralde, and Abel Bautista Saavedra. The involved municipalities are Apolo, San Buenaventura, Ixiamas, Curva, and Pelechuco.

The park is bordered to the west by the Tambopata-Candamo Reserve and Bahuaja-Sonene National Park in Peru, to the east by the TCO (Tierra Comunitaria de Origen, 'indigenous community land') Tacana I, to the north by TCO Tacana II, and to the south by the Apolobamba Integrated Management Natural Area, TCO Lecos Apolo, TCO Lecos Larecaja, and the Pilón Lajas Biosphere Reserve and Communal Lands.

Madidi NP and IMNA constitute one of the largest protected areas in Bolivia. According to the Supreme Decree, they have a total land area of 18,957.5 km^{2} (7,319.5 sq mi) of which 12,715 km^{2} (4,909 sq mi) come under the heading of National Park and 6,242.5 km^{2} (2,410.2 sq mi) come under the heading of Integrated Management Natural Area.

The park boundaries are between 12°30' and 14°44' southern latitude and between 67°30' and 69°51' western longitude.

The area under conservation ranges in elevation from 180 to 5,760 metres (590 to 18,900 ft) above sea level and includes a variety of ecosystems.

== Weather ==
The climate varies significantly with elevation: it is cold in the alpine region, moderate at mid-level elevations, and tropical in the northern lowlands.

Winds predominantly blow from the north, while cold fronts from the south have little impact on the temperature of the Madidi region. The dry season aligns with the southern hemisphere's winter. The average annual temperature is 26°C, though it varies widely depending on altitude.

Annual precipitation averages around 716 mm. The wet season spans from October to March, while the dry season lasts from May to September.

== Flora ==
Madidi National Park hosts more than 8,000 documented species of vascular plants, with a high likelihood of many more being discovered.

The Madidi Project of the Missouri Botanical Garden had identified at least 132 new plant species in Madidi as of 2010.

== Wildlife ==
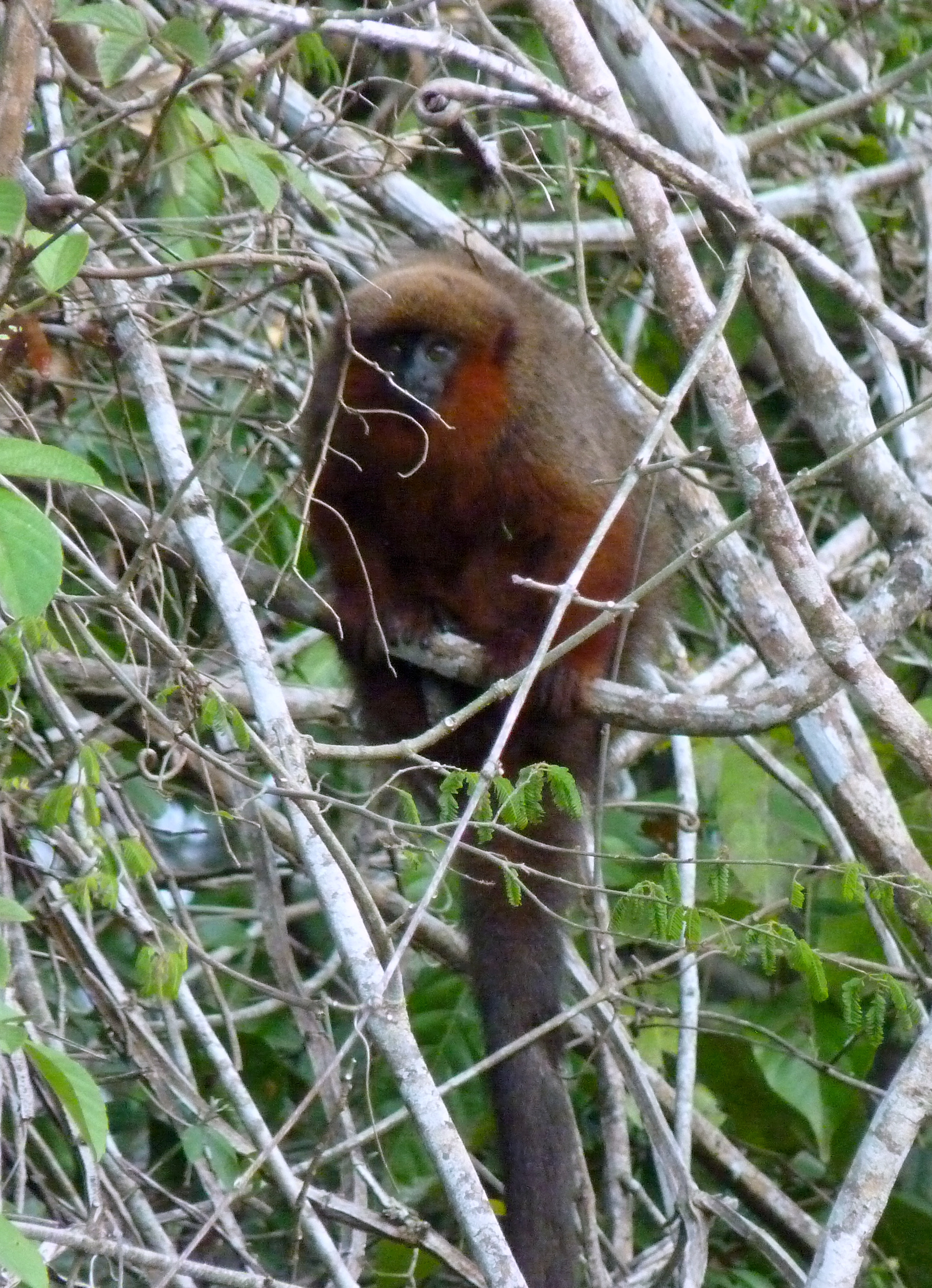
Plecturocebus aureipalatii, a species of titi monkey found in the national park

Dr. Robert Wallace, a wildlife biologist, is credited for discovering a previously unidentified species of titi monkey in Madidi. This monkey is endemic to the area. The right to name the new species was auctioned through an agreement between the scientists, the Bolivian National Protected Area Service (SERNAP), and the Foundation for the Development of the Protected Areas (FUNDESNAP). The auction was won by online casino GoldenPalace.com, who paid US$650,000 into a trust fund that now generates enough income to pay for fourteen park guards annually. The species was named Plecturocebus aureipalatii with the specific epithet meaning "of the Golden Palace".

The park is also notable for being home to over 1,254 bird species, representing 14% of the world's approximately 9,000 bird species. Megafauna living in the park include jaguar, spectacled bear, maned wolf, vicuña, and giant otter. In addition to its land biodiversity, there is also a rich and varied aquatic life.

- Mammals: 272 species
- Birds: 1,254 species
- Fish: 496 species
- Amphibians: 213 species
- Reptiles: 204 species
- Arthropods: over 120,000 species

(undescribed species not included)

== Ecotourism ==
Madidi National Park is known for its efforts in responsible tourism and community ecotourism. Notable ventures include the Chalalan Ecolodge, which is owned by the indigenous people of San José de Uchupiamonas, and the San Miguel del Bala Ecolodge, owned by the San Miguel Tacana community. These lodges are situated within the park. Additionally, there have been recent openings of local initiatives such as the Berraco del Madidi Amazon adventure tour, Madidi Jungle Ecolodge, Sadiri Ecolodge, and Ecolodge Madidi Heart.

Chalalan Ecolodge is a community ecotourism venture owned by the indigenous village of San José de Uchupiamonas, which receives profits from the hostel's operations and contributes to areas such as health and education. Established in 1999, Chalalan offers tours to Madidi National Park. The tourism package includes transportation from Rurrenabaque to the hostel, a tour of the Beni and Tuichi rivers, cabin accommodation in Tacana-style rooms with private bathrooms, international fusion cuisine (English Amazon), and guidance from indigenous community members who speak Quechua and Spanish and are trained and certified. Chalalan operates with a system of solar panels for clean energy and has implemented solid waste management and wastewater treatment systems to minimize environmental impact. The hostel consists of nine cabins located near Lake Chalalan, which inspired its name. Chalalan features 30 kilometers of environmental interpretation trails, paddle canoes for exploring the lagoon, a large gazebo, and a dining room with a social area. The average stay is four days and three nights.

Sadiri Lodge was established as an alternative approach to protect against extractive and deforestation activities that threaten the rich and diverse natural area and water reservoir. It operates as a responsible, non-profit community tourism initiative that also promotes local community development. Currently, Sadiri Lodge is managed and administered by members of the San José De Uchupiamonas Indigenous People, located in the heart of the Madidi National Park. The primary goal of Sadiri Lodge is to preserve the 34,000 hectares of pristine forest, natural water reservoirs, and diverse wildlife of the Bolivian jungle. The area under Sadiri's protection contains over 430 species of birds and a variety of monkeys, reptiles, insects, amphibians, and vibrant flora like bromeliads and orchids. Expert local Uchupiamonas guides identify these species using their ancestral forest knowledge, animal calling techniques, keen senses, and cultural stories, providing visitors with an enriching experience.

Berraco Madidi Amazon Adventure Tour is a private initiative led by a member of the indigenous Quechua-Tacana community José de Uchupiamonas. The project was conceived in 2007 and realized in 2010. The guided tour is operated entirely by the community to create jobs and benefits for its members. The ecocamp is situated within the community's territory, spanning 210 thousand hectares, and is accessible by a 6-hour boat ride with an outboard motor. It is the most remote camp in Madidi National Park and features cabins built in the traditional Quechua-Takana style using local natural resources.

Madidi Jungle Ecolodge, open to visitors since mid-2011, is a 100% local initiative operated by indigenous families of the TCO San José de Uchupiamonas. The lodge is situated within Madidi National Park, covering 210 hectares of forest. Accessible by a 3.5-hour motorboat ride upstream along the Beni and Tuichi rivers, the ecolodge accommodates up to 14 visitors in traditional Amazonian-style cabins.

== Conservation threats ==
=== Bala Dam Project ===
One of the threats against the Madidi National Park has been the proposed Bala Dam Project at the Beni River in the Bala Gorge, where the Beni River breaks through the Bala Mountain Range. The proposed hydroelectric dam project has a long history—it was especially relevant in 1998 but later abandoned, before resurfacing again in 2007. The dam would flood about 2,000 km^{2} (770 sq mi), including a large part of Madidi, with potentially catastrophic consequences. Simulations suggest that a dam failure or break would flood the whole area for several days.

=== Apolo–Ixiamas road project ===
Another threat to Madidi is the proposed construction of the Apolo–Ixiamas road. Altiplano communities and politicians have long wanted to colonize the park for timber and agriculture exploitation. However, independent studies from the NGO Conservation Strategy Fund have shown that this project would not be a good development alternative for the region. The project is economically unfeasible and would induce significant deforestation within the protected area.

Environmental losses caused by the road project could threaten current and future conservation and tourism activities in this protected area, which generate significant economic benefits to the region. Alternative investments, such as improving the road that connects Apolo to La Paz and directing the road investment towards social investments such as health and education, have greater prospects of improving local quality of life while maintaining the important environmental services provided by Madidi.

== See also ==
- Madidi River

== See also ==
- Panthera onca boliviensis
