= Rurrenabaque Airport =

Airport in Bolivia

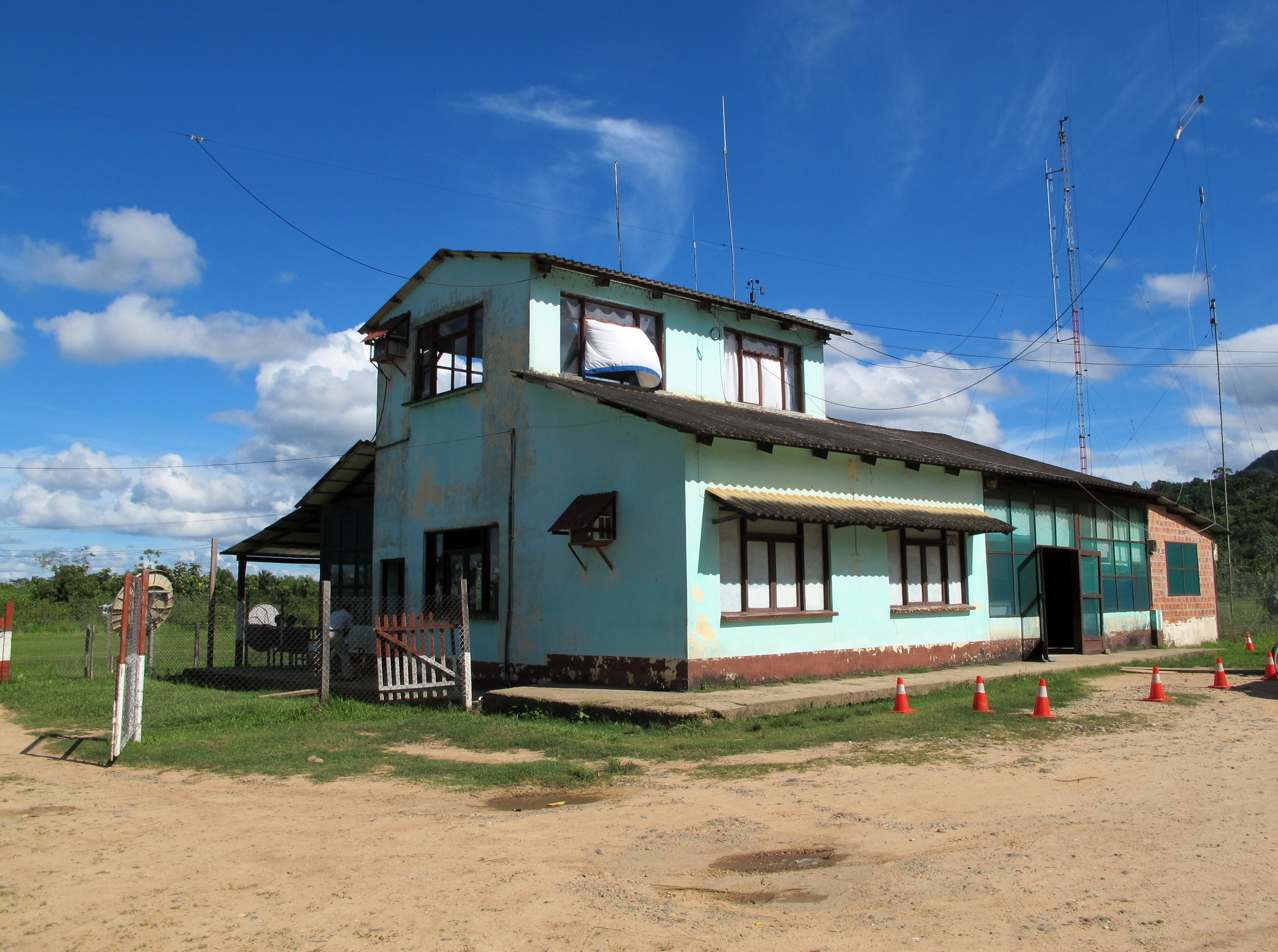
- IATA: RBQ; ICAO: SLRQ

Summary
- Airport type: Public
- Serves: Rurrenabaque, Bolivia
- Elevation AMSL: 676 ft (206 m)
- Coordinates: 14°25′30″S 67°30′05″W

Map
- Location of airport in Bolivia

Runways
Direction	Length		Surface
Direction	m	ft	Surface
14/32	1,500	4,921	Asphalt
- Sources: GCM Google Maps

Rurrenabaque Airport (IATA: RBQ, ICAO: SLRQ) is an airport serving Rurrenabaque, a port city on the Beni River in the Beni Department of Bolivia. The airport is 2 kilometres (1.2 mi) northeast of the city.

Runway 14/32 was asphalted in 2010. Before, because of the grass runways, no flights could land or takeoff on a rainy day, and delays were usual in the rainy season (December - April).

Rurrenbaque is at the base of Bolivia's Cordillera Real mountains, and there is mountainous terrain just south of the airport.

The Rurrenabaque non-directional beacon (Ident: RBQ) is located on the field.

== Airlines and destinations ==
Airlines	Destinations
Boliviana de Aviación	Cochabamba
EcoJet	Cochabamba

== See also ==
- Transport in Bolivia
- List of airports in Bolivia
