= Rurrenabaque Municipality =

Rurrenabaque
- Municipality
- Location within Bolivia
- Coordinates: 14°40′S 67°15′W
- Country: Bolivia
- Department: Beni
- Province: José Ballivián
- Seat: Rurrenabaque

Population (2001)
  - Total: 14,000
- Time zone: UTC-4 (BOT)

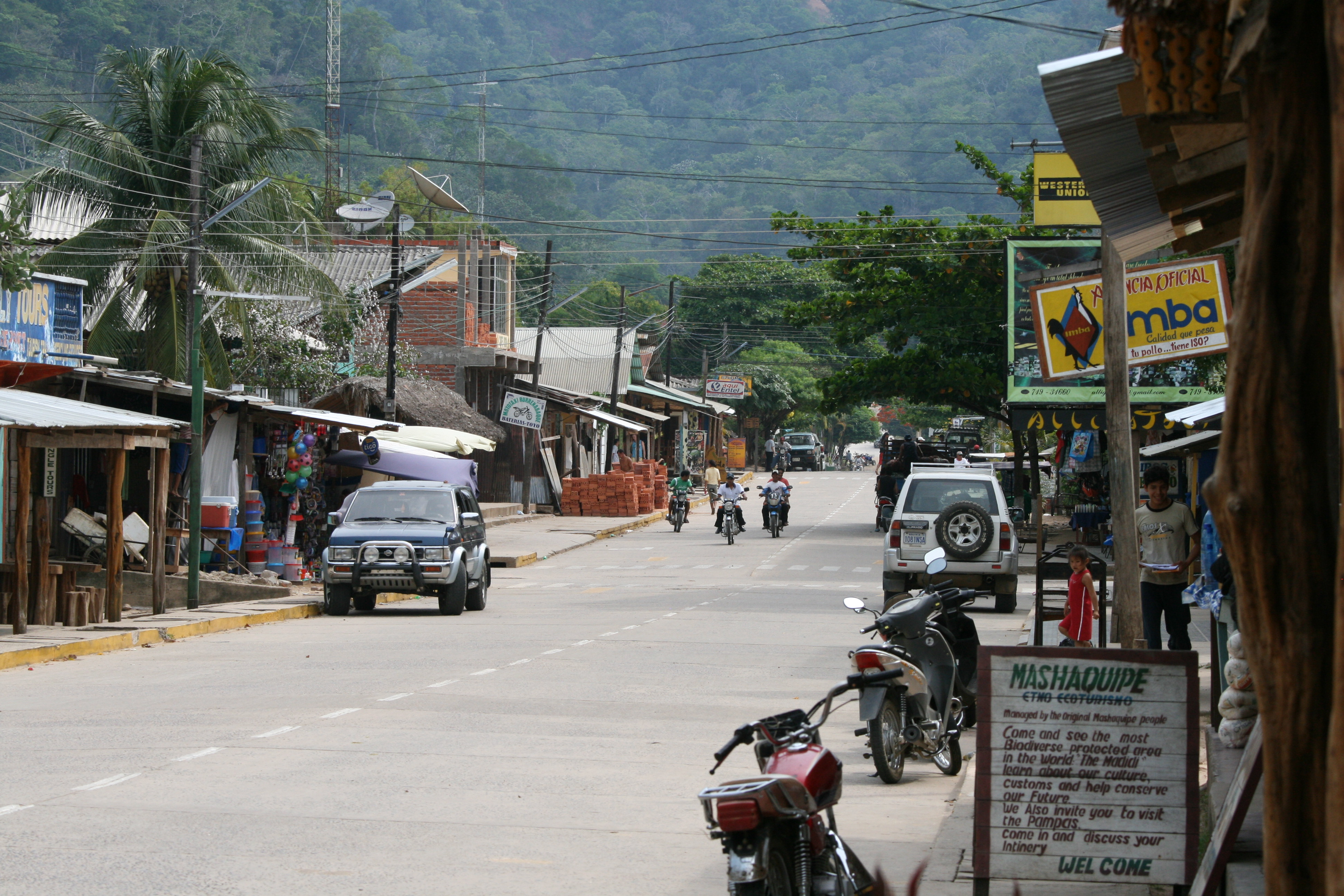
Street scene in the town of Rurrenabaque

Rurrenabaque is a municipality in the José Ballivián Province in the Beni Department of Bolivia. The seat of the municipality is the town of Rurrenabaque. At the 2001 census the municipality had 14,000 inhabitants, of which 8,000 lived in the town of Rurrenabaque.
