= Reyes Municipality =

Reyes
- Municipality
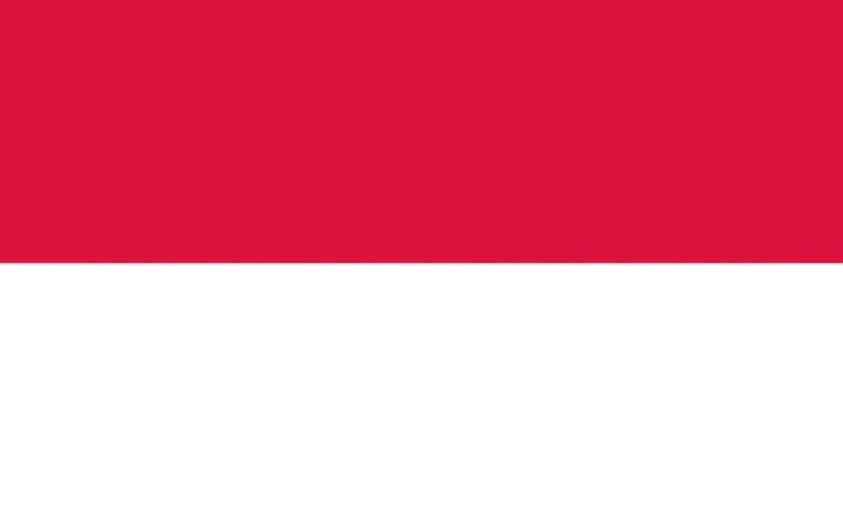
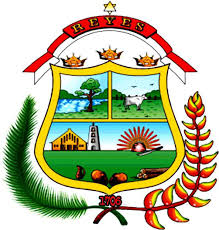
- Flag Coat of arms

- Location within Bolivia
- Coordinates: 13°20′S 66°55′W
- Country: Bolivia
- Department: Beni
- Province: José Ballivián
- Seat: Reyes

Population (2010)
  - Total: 16,468
- Time zone: UTC-4 (BOT)

Reyes is a municipality of the José Ballivián Province in the Beni Department of Bolivia. The seat of the municipality is the city of Reyes.
