= Ixiamas Municipality =

- Municipality
- Flag

- Location within Bolivia
- Coordinates: 13°0′S 68°0′W
- Country: Bolivia
- Department: La Paz Department
- Province: Abel Iturralde Province
- Seat: Ixiamas

Population (2001)
  - Total: 5,625
- Time zone: UTC-4 (BOT)

Ixiamas Municipality is the first municipal section of the Abel Iturralde Province in the La Paz Department, Bolivia. Its seat is Ixiamas.

In 2019, the municipality created the Área Municipal de Conservación y Manejo del Bajo Madidi (about 1,535,487 hectares (15,355 km2)); its creation received technical support from Conservation International Bolivia. Work in the area has also included support for sustainable production initiatives with Indigenous communities.
