= Santa Rosa Municipality, Beni =

Santa Rosa
- Municipality
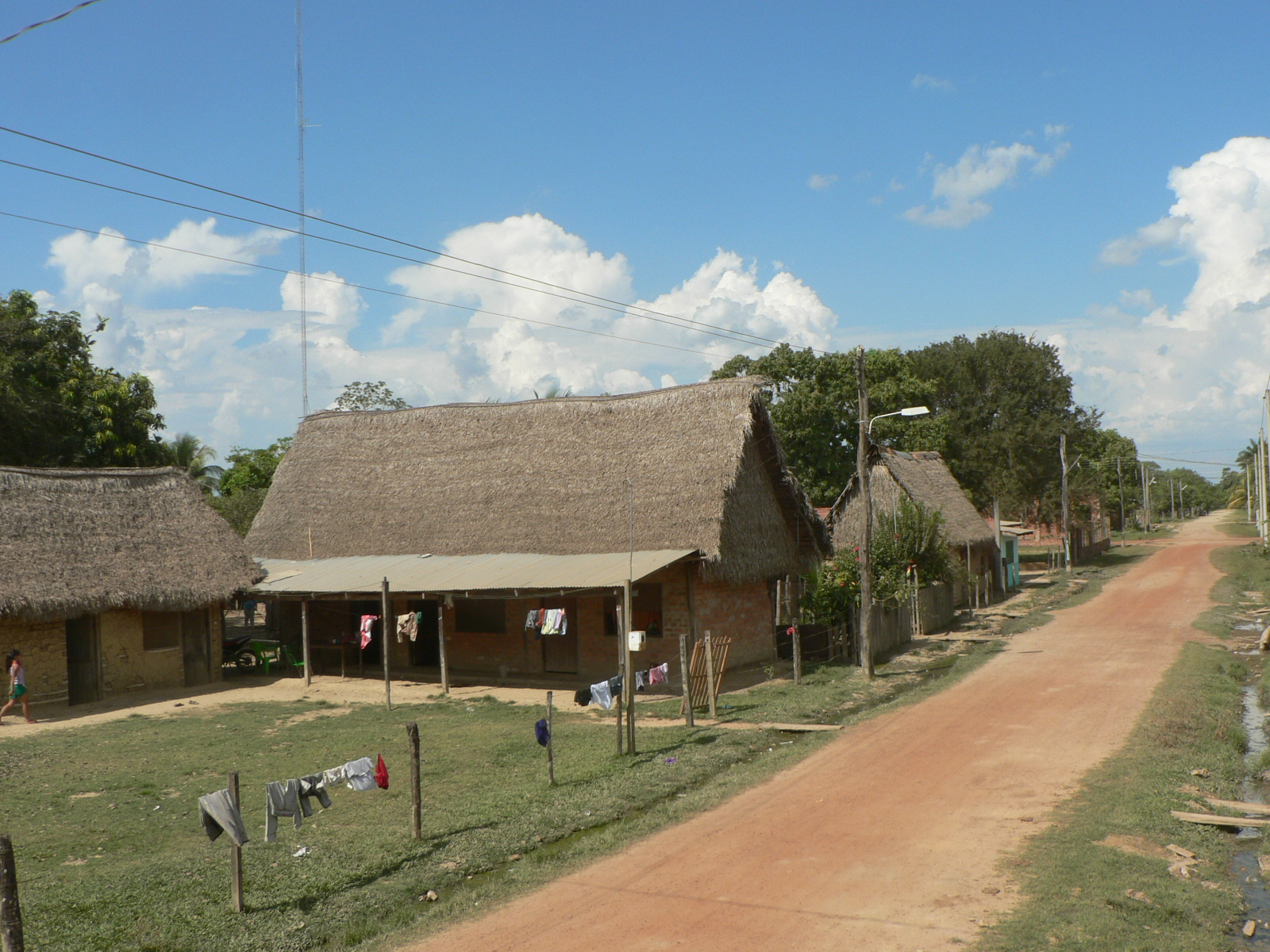
- Santa Rosa de(l) Yacuma

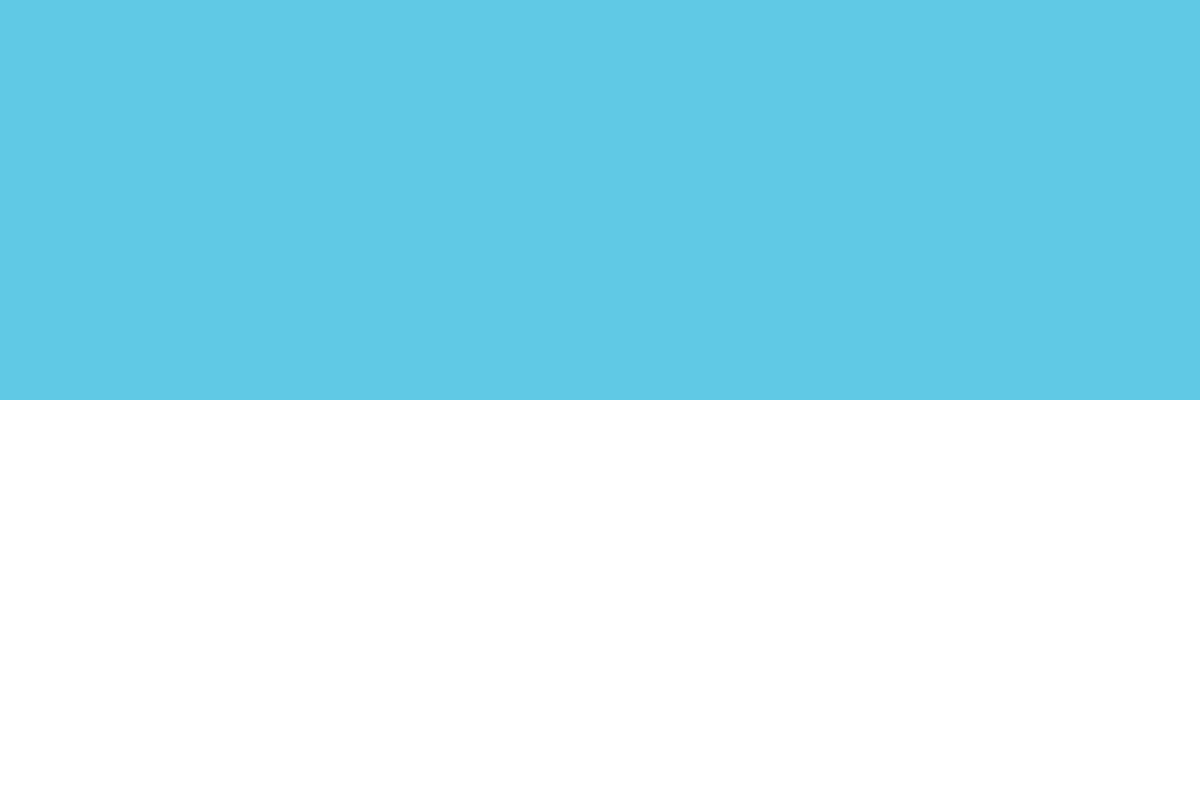
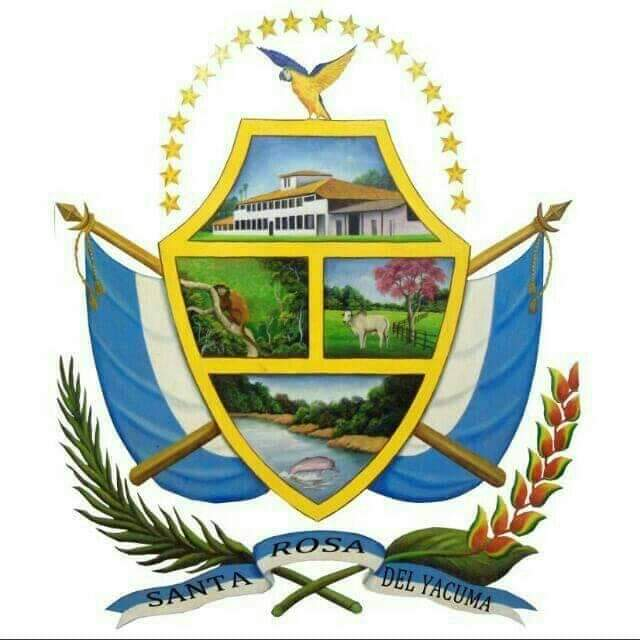
- Flag Coat of arms

- Location within Bolivia
- Coordinates: 13°00′S 66°40′W
- Country: Bolivia
- Department: Beni
- Province: José Ballivián
- Seat: Santa Rosa
- Time zone: UTC-4 (BOT)

Santa Rosa or Santa Rosa de(l) Yacuma is a municipality of the José Ballivián Province in the Beni Department of Bolivia. The seat of the municipality is the town of Santa Rosa de Yacuma.
