= Beni Biological Station Biosphere Reserve =

Beni Biological Station and Biosphere Reserve
- Reserva de Biosfera y Estación Biológica del Beni
- IUCN category VI (protected area with sustainable use of natural resources)
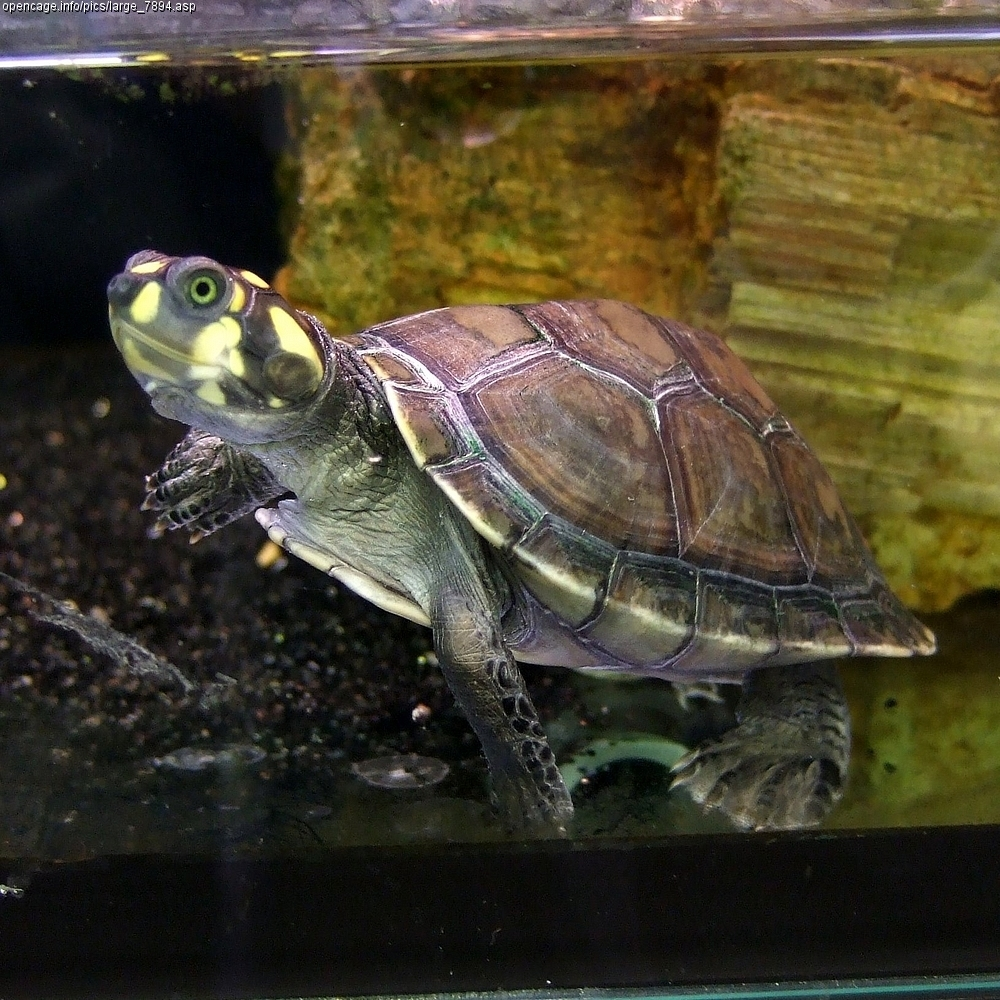
- Yellow-spotted river turtle

- Location within Bolivia
- Location: Beni Department, Bolivia
- Coordinates: 14.637°S 66.285°W
- Area: 1,350 km^{2} (520 mi^{2})
- Established: 1982
- Governing body: Servicio Nacional de Áreas Protegidas (SERNAP)

Beni Biological Station and Biosphere Reserve (Reserva de Biosfera y Estación Biológica del Beni) is a protected area in Bolivia located in the Beni Department, in the José Ballivián Province and Yacuma Province. Early financing for management activities in the reserve was linked to the 1987 debt-for-nature swap arranged with Conservation International Bolivia.
