= San Buenaventura Municipality, La Paz =

San Buenaventura
- Municipality
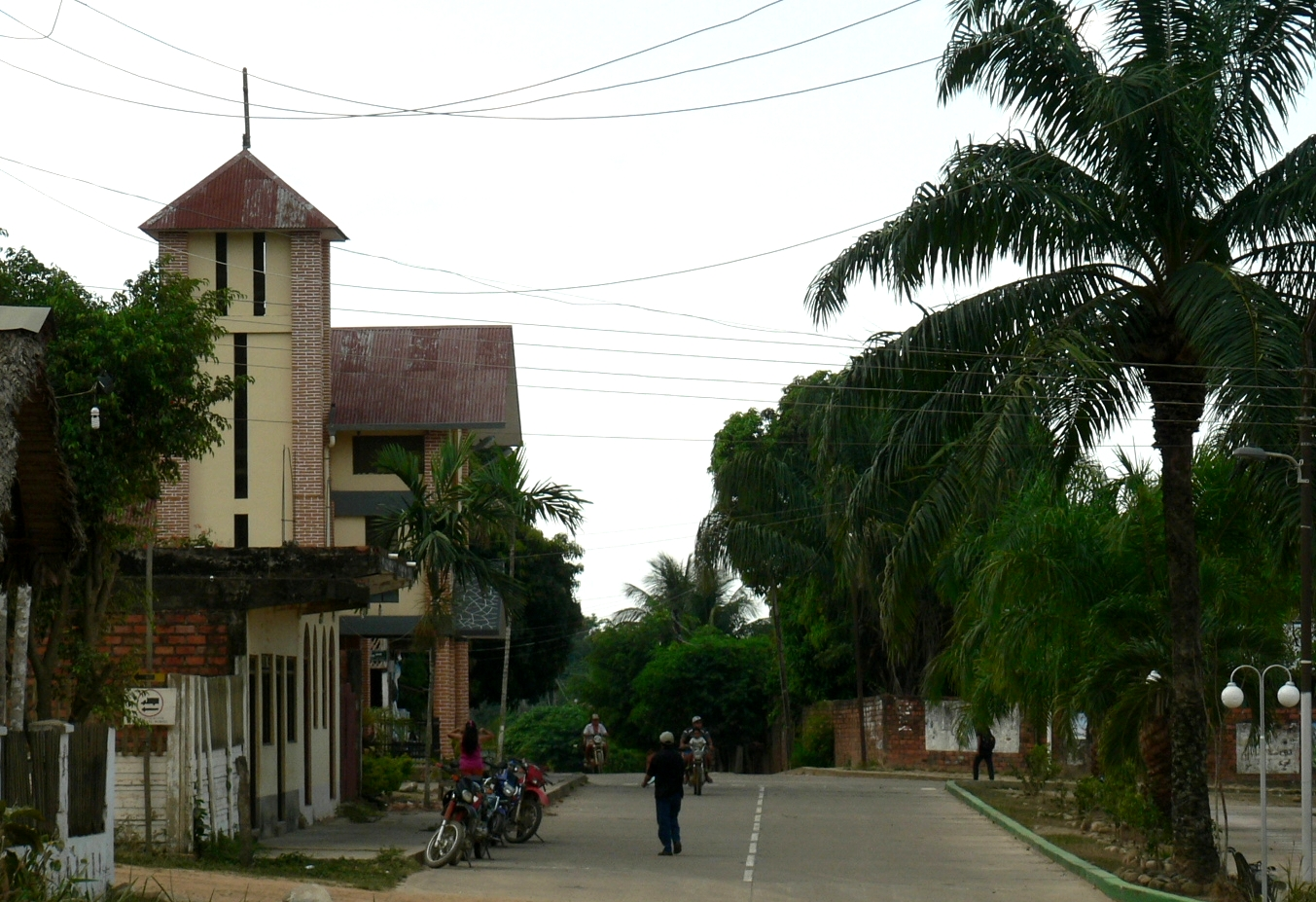
- San Buenaventura

- Location within Bolivia
- Coordinates: 14°26′S 67°32′W
- Country: Bolivia
- Department: La Paz Department
- Province: Abel Iturralde Province
- Seat: San Buenaventura

Population
  - Ethnicities: Quechua Aymara
- Time zone: UTC-4 (BOT)

San Buenaventura Municipality is the second municipal section of the Abel Iturralde Province located in the La Paz Department in Bolivia. Its seat is San Buenaventura.

== Languages ==
The languages spoken in the San Buenaventura Municipality are primarily Spanish and Quechua.

Language	Inhabitants
Quechua	640
Aymara	285
Guaraní	7
Another native	626
Spanish	5,669
Foreign	77
Only native	154
Native and Spanish	1,337
Only Spanish	4,334
