= El Sena =

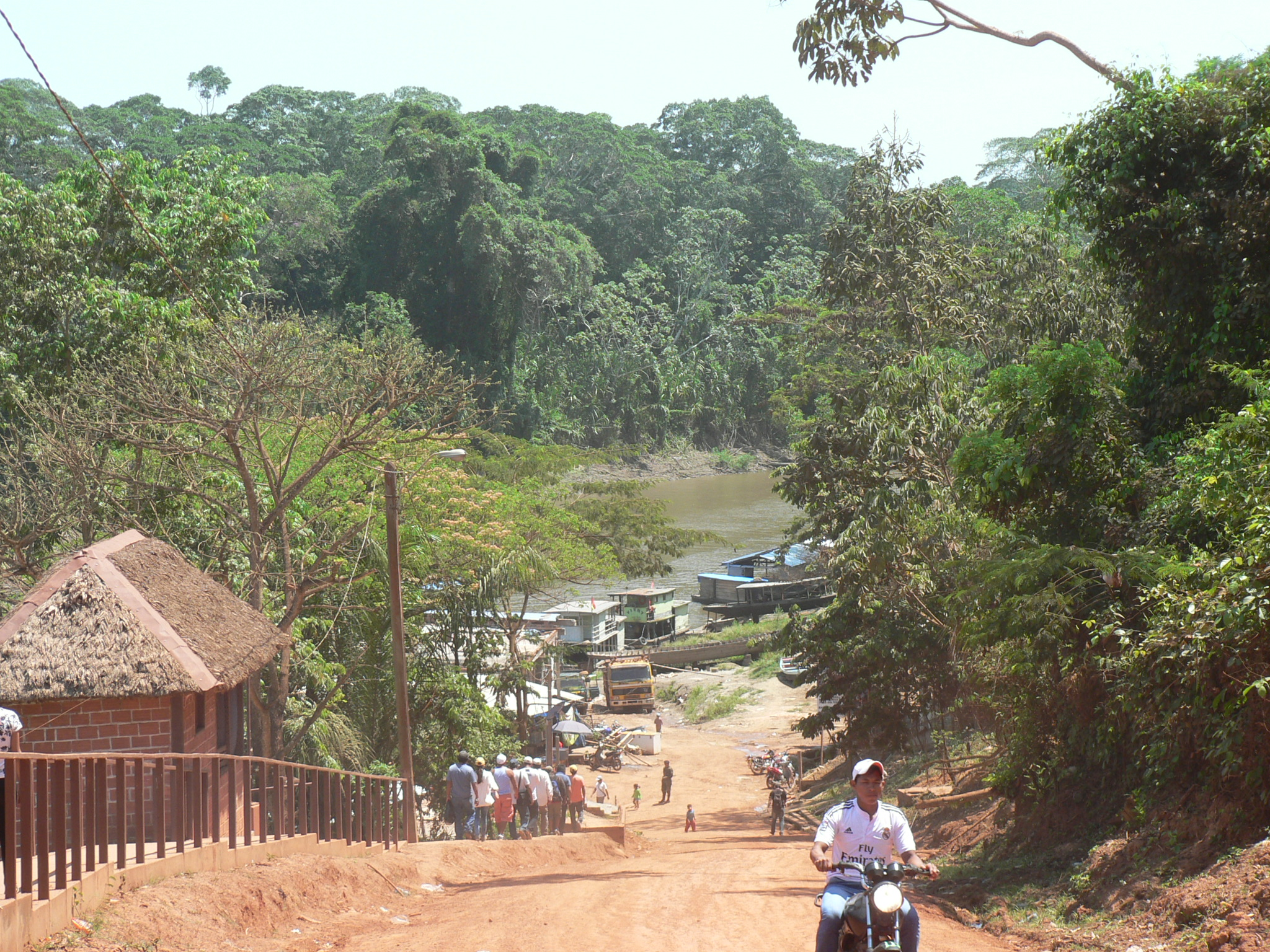

- Location in Bolivia
- Coordinates: 11°29′2″S 67°14′52″W
- Country: Bolivia
- Department: Pando Department
- Province: Madre de Dios Province
- Municipality: El Sena Municipality
- Canton: Bolívar Canton
- Elevation: 12,500 ft (3,800 m)

Population (2012)
  - Total: 2,587
- Time zone: UTC-4 (BOT)

El Sena is a village in the Madre de Dios Province, in the Pando Department of Bolivia. It is the capital of El Sena Municipality. In January 2024, the municipality created the Área Natural de Manejo Integrado El Gran Manupare, a protected area of 452,639 hectares (4,526 km2) supported by Conservation International Bolivia alongside municipal and local partners.
