= Ixiamas Airport =

Airport in Bolivia

- IATA: none; ICAO: SLIX

Summary
- Airport type: Public
- Serves: Ixiamas, Bolivia
- Elevation AMSL: 725 ft / 221 m
- Coordinates: 13°45′55″S 68°08′12″W

Map
- Location of Ixiamas Airport in Bolivia

Runways
Direction	Length		Surface
Direction	m	ft	Surface
17/35	2,200	7,218	Asphalt
- Sources: Landings.com Google Maps GCM

Ixiamas Airport (ICAO: SLIX) is an airport serving the town of Ixiamas in the La Paz Department of Bolivia.

The airport is adjacent to the west side of the town. Runway 35 has a 150 metres (490 ft) displaced threshold.

== See also ==
- Transport in Bolivia
- List of airports in Bolivia
