= Ixiamas =

Archaeological site in Bolivia

- Town
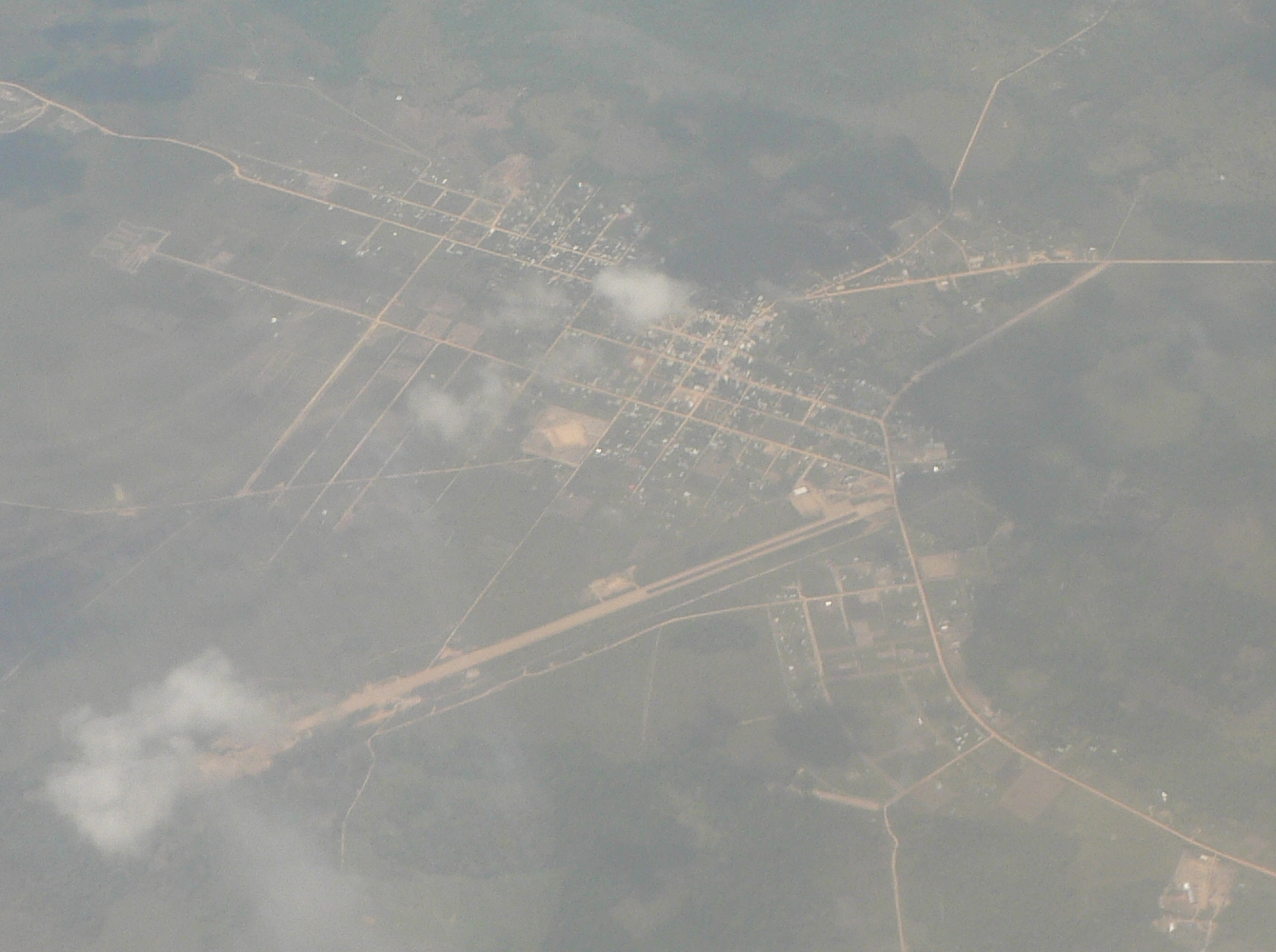
- Ixiamas as seen from the air

- Location within Bolivia
- Coordinates: 13°46′S 68°8′W
- Country: Bolivia
- Department: La Paz Department
- Province: Abel Iturralde Province
- Municipality: Ixiamas Municipality
- Time zone: UTC-4 (BOT)
- Climate: Af

Ixiamas is a town and municipality in the La Paz Department, Bolivia. It is on the level pampa 10 kilometres (6.2 mi) northeast of the Cordillera Central foothills.

It is served by Ixiamas Airport.

== Climate ==
Ixiamas has a tropical rainforest climate, sitting on the southern edge of the Amazon forest in western Bolivia. Ixiamas receives ample rainfall throughout the year and is generally hot year round, with slightly milder winter temperatures.

Climate data for Ixiamas, Bolivia
Month	Jan	Feb	Mar	Apr	May	Jun	Jul	Aug	Sep	Oct	Nov	Dec	Year
Record high °C (°F)	35.0 (95.0)	35.0 (95.0)	36.0 (96.8)	34.6 (94.3)	35.8 (96.4)	33.3 (91.9)	34.2 (93.6)	36.4 (97.5)	38.3 (100.9)	36.5 (97.7)	36.0 (96.8)	36.8 (98.2)	38.3 (100.9)
Mean daily maximum °C (°F)	30.2 (86.4)	30.8 (87.4)	31.5 (88.7)	30.7 (87.3)	29.4 (84.9)	30.1 (86.2)	30.5 (86.9)	32.1 (89.8)	33.3 (91.9)	32.2 (90.0)	31.3 (88.3)	31.3 (88.3)	31.1 (88.0)
Daily mean °C (°F)	27.1 (80.8)	27.0 (80.6)	27.1 (80.8)	26.8 (80.2)	26.4 (79.5)	25.6 (78.1)	25.7 (78.3)	27.3 (81.1)	28.2 (82.8)	28.1 (82.6)	27.7 (81.9)	27.3 (81.1)	27.0 (80.6)
Mean daily minimum °C (°F)	22.3 (72.1)	22.4 (72.3)	21.7 (71.1)	21.4 (70.5)	18.7 (65.7)	16.8 (62.2)	17.5 (63.5)	18.4 (65.1)	20.3 (68.5)	21.5 (70.7)	21.6 (70.9)	21.8 (71.2)	20.4 (68.7)
Record low °C (°F)	20.6 (69.1)	20.0 (68.0)	17.2 (63.0)	15.0 (59.0)	10.0 (50.0)	9.9 (49.8)	8.9 (48.0)	10.0 (50.0)	13.8 (56.8)	16.1 (61.0)	16.0 (60.8)	19.0 (66.2)	8.9 (48.0)
Average precipitation mm (inches)	292.3 (11.51)	382.2 (15.05)	174.2 (6.86)	127.9 (5.04)	128.3 (5.05)	63.3 (2.49)	60.0 (2.36)	94.1 (3.70)	155.3 (6.11)	164.4 (6.47)	217.2 (8.55)	279.1 (10.99)	2,138.3 (84.19)
Average precipitation days (≥ 0.1 mm)	17	17	18	13	7	3	2	2	5	10	12	16	122
Average relative humidity (%)	79	80	80	81	78	76	70	68	68	72	76	80	76
Source: SENAMHI
