= GoldenPalace.com =

Online casino

Golden Palace
- Type: Private
- Industry: Betting and gaming
- Founded: 1997
- Headquarters: Waterloo, Belgium
- Website: goldenpalace.com

GoldenPalace.com is an online casino that operates under a license granted by CIGA (Curaçao Internet Gaming Association). They are known for their publicity stunts and large "bonuses" that had to be wagered up to fifty times before claiming. On several occasions, this led to controversy when the site refused to pay players seen to be only playing to claim the free money, and not for the entertainment value. One key incident led to the site's former software provider, Microgaming, terminating their agreement. This led GoldenPalace and its sister casinos to move to rival Playtech in 2003; since 2013, it uses provider IGSONLINE.

== History ==
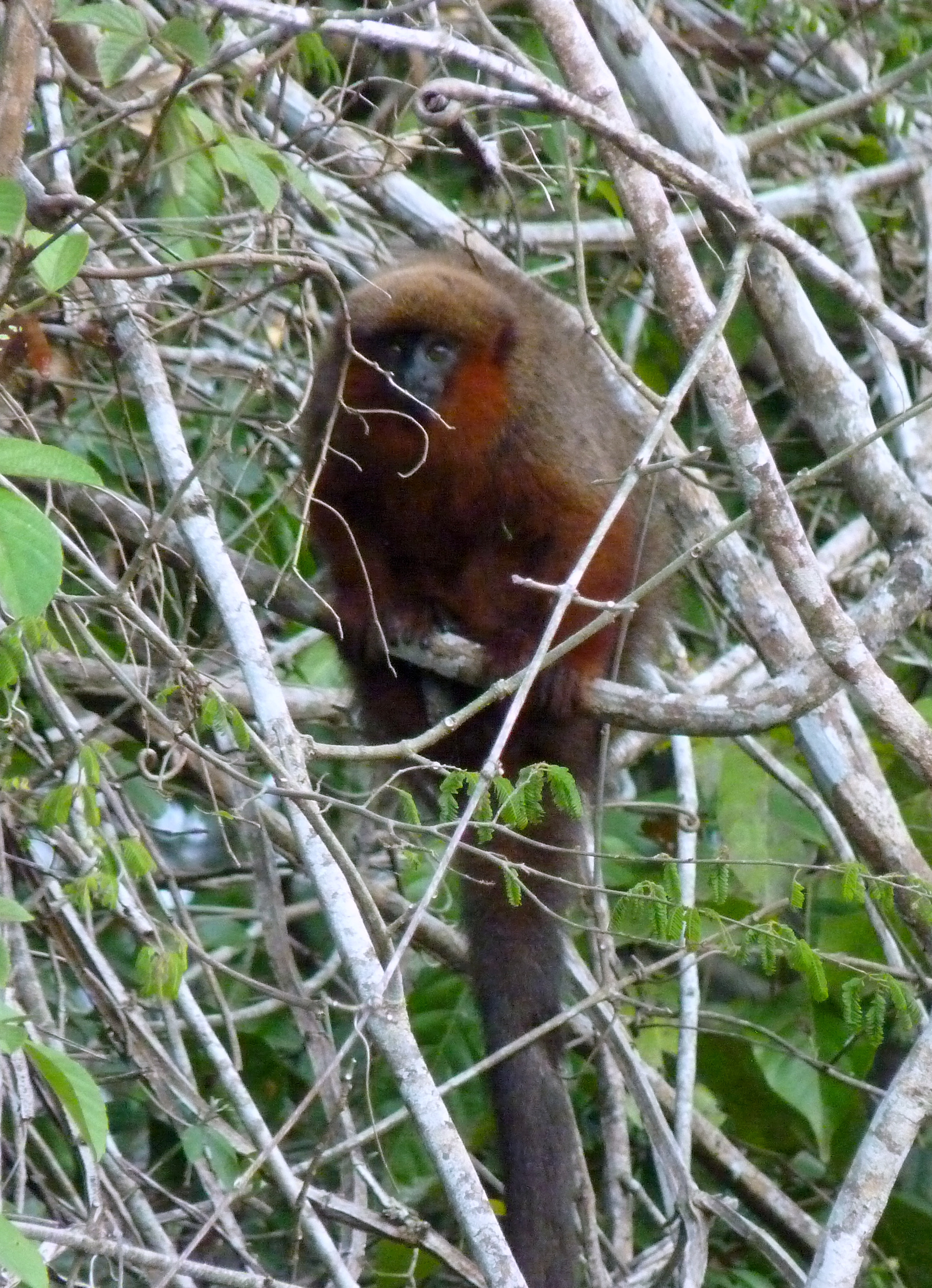
The "GoldenPalace.com monkey", which the website bought the naming rights to.

The casino has paid many boxers to wear temporary tattoos on their backs promoting the site. GoldenPalace.com has also been accused of far more disruptive ambush marketing stunts. The casino sponsored serial streaker Mark Roberts in several of his escapades, including his "performances" at the 2003 UEFA Cup final and Super Bowl XXXVIII in 2004; at both events, he wore a temporary GoldenPalace.com tattoo.

GoldenPalace.com is also well known for its winning internet auctions, mostly for bizarre items. Notable examples include a $28,000 grilled cheese sandwich purportedly displaying an image of the Virgin Mary, a $75,100 plastic French fry from a McDonald's Super Bowl commercial, a car previously owned by Pope Benedict XVI, and William Shatner's kidney stone, for which it paid $25,000. On March 3, 2005, they paid $650,000 for the naming rights of the recently discovered Madidi titi monkey. The "GoldenPalace.com monkey" was officially named Callicebus aureipalatii, with "aureipalatii" literally translating into "of the golden palace" in Latin. GoldenPalace.com also paid a woman to permanently tattoo their domain name on her forehead in 2005.
