= Abel Iturralde Province =

Abel Iturralde
- Province
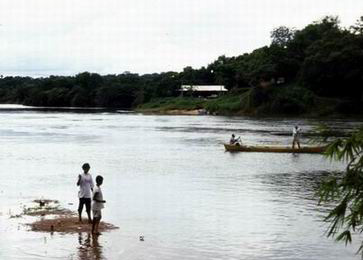
- Madre de Dios River

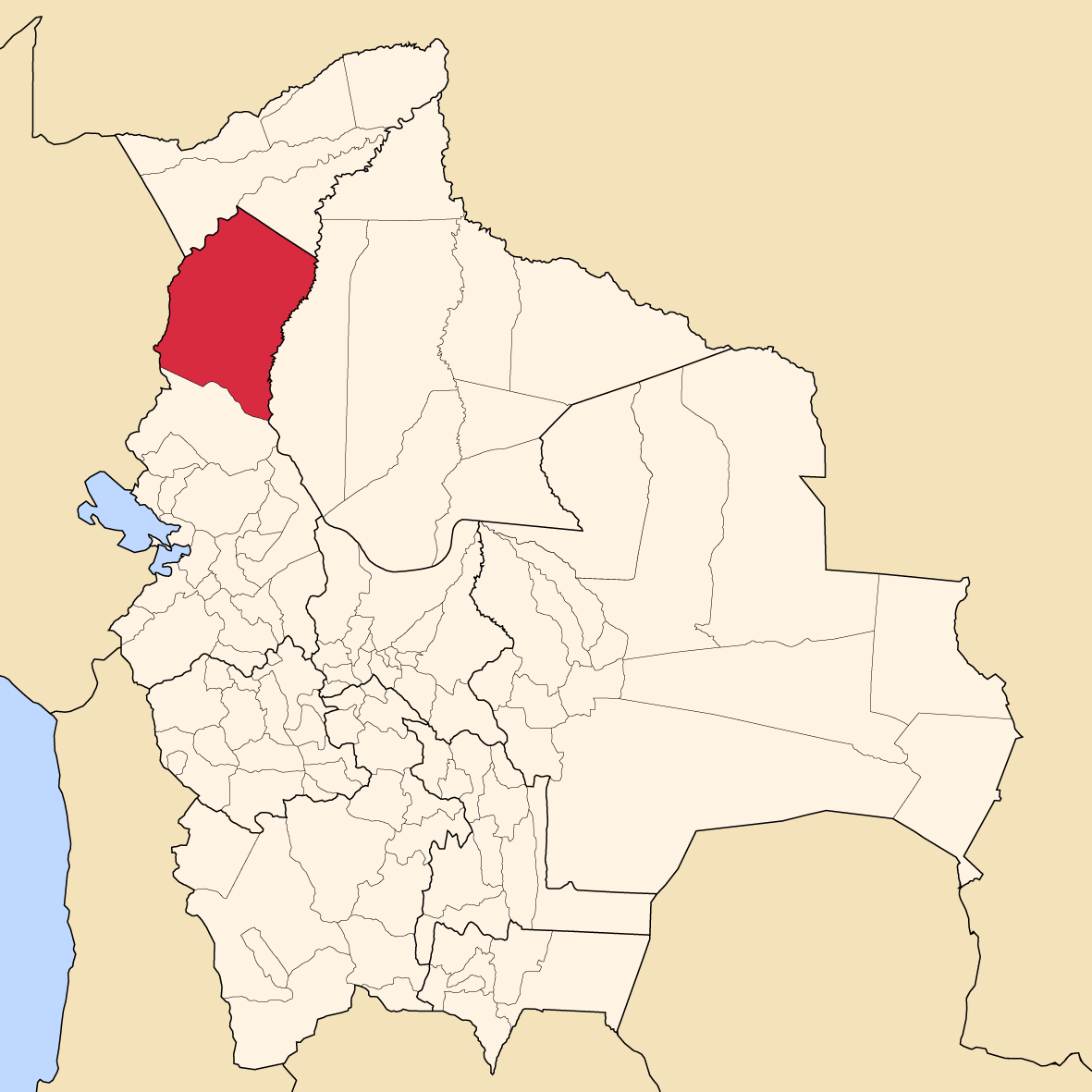
- Location of Abel Iturralde Province within Bolivia

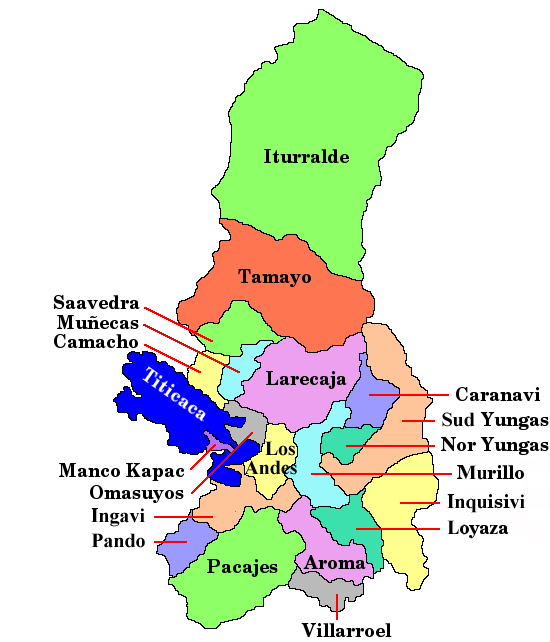
- Provinces of the La Paz Department
- Coordinates: 13°10′0″S 68°0′0″W
- Country: Bolivia
- Department: La Paz Department
- Capital: Ixiamas

Area
  - Total: 42,815 km^{2} (16,531 sq mi)

Population (2024 census)
  - Total: 22,602
  - Density: 0.52790/km^{2} (1.3673/sq mi)
  - Ethnicities: Aymara Quechua Araona
- Time zone: UTC-4 (BOT)

Abel Iturralde is one of the twenty provinces of the Bolivian La Paz Department. It is situated in its northern part. Its name honors Abel Iturralde Palacios, a Bolivian politician. Madidi National Park is partially in this province.

== Location ==
Abel Iturralde province is located between 11° 48' and 14° 35' South and between 66° 55' and 69° 05' West. It extends over 300 km from North to South, and 200 km from east to west.

The province is situated on the northern edges of the Cordillera Central. It is bordered to the west by the Madre de Dios and Heath Rivers and to the east by the Río Beni. The province borders Pando Department in the north, Peru in the west, Franz Tamayo Province in the south, and Beni in the east.

== Population ==
The population of Abel Iturralde Province has increased by 100% over the recent two decades:

- 1992: 8,226 inhabitants (census)
- 2001: 11,828 inhabitants (census)
- 2005: 14,060 inhabitants (est.)
- 2012: 18,073 inhabitants (est.)
- 2024: 22,602 inhabitants (census)

98.3% of the population speak Spanish, 12.1% speak Quechua, 6.7% Aymara, and 9.8% other indigenous languages. (2001)

The literacy rate of the province's population is 83.5%. (1992)

83.8% of the population have no access to electricity, 58.7% have no sanitary facilities. (1992)

87.0% of the population are Catholics, 10.6% are Protestants. (1992)

== Division ==
The province comprises two municipalities:

- Ixiamas Municipality - 5,625 inhabitants (2005)
- San Buenaventura Municipality - 6,203 inhabitants
