= Conservation Strategy Fund =

Conservation organization

Conservation Strategy Fund logo

Conservation Strategy Fund (CSF) is a global conservation organization headquartered in Washington, D.C., with country offices in Bolivia, Brazil, Peru, Indonesia, and Kenya.

== Achievements ==
Achievements include helping to establish 1.5 million acres of protected area in central Brazil, helping local people divert the construction of a road through Volcán Barú National Park in Panama, successfully preventing construction of a dam that would have flooded significant portions of Madidi National Park in Bolivia, and delaying the paving of highway BR-319 in the Brazilian Amazon which, without proper safeguards, could have inflicted harm on the world's largest rainforest.
