= Manuripi-Heath Amazonian Wildlife National Reserve =

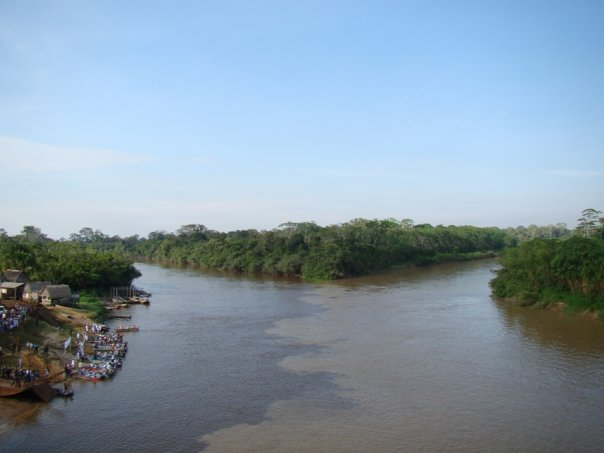
- Interactive map of Manuripi-Heath Amazonian Wildlife National Reserve
- Location: Bolivia; Pando Department
- Coordinates: 11°55′S 68°5′W
- Area: 747,000 ha (1,850,000 acres)
- Established: 1973 (D.S: Nº 11252)
- Governing body: Servicio Nacional de Áreas Protegidas (SERNAP)

Manuripi-Heath Amazonian Wildlife National Reserve (Reserva Nacional de Vida Silvestre Amazónica Manuripi-Heath) is a protected area in the Pando Department, Bolivia. It is situated in the Manuripi Province and the Madre de Dios Province.
