= Rurrenabaque =

- Town and municipality
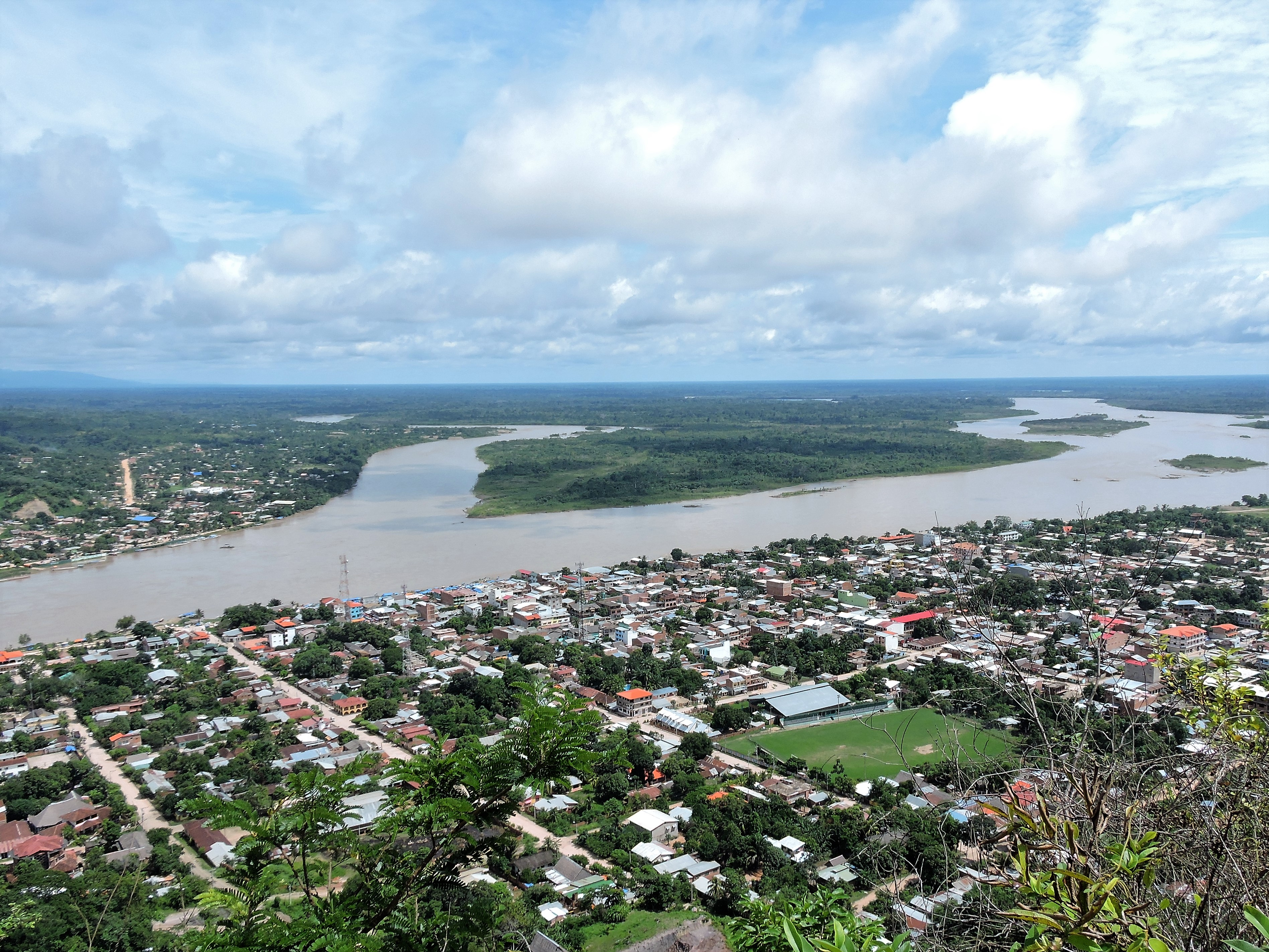

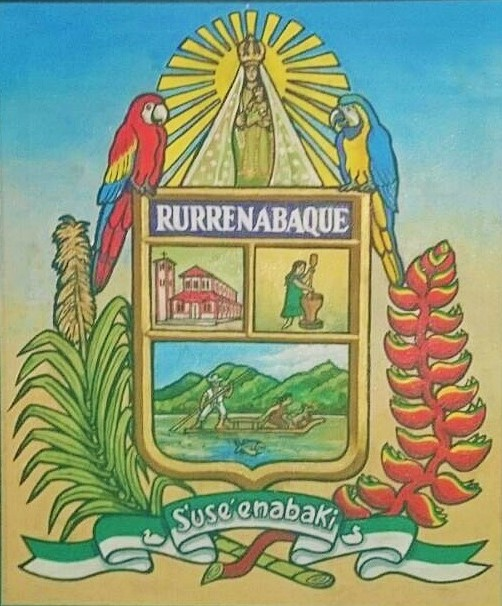
- Flag Seal

- Location of Rurrenabaque town in Bolivia
- Coordinates: 14°26′32″S 67°31′42″W
- Country: Bolivia
- Department: Beni Department
- Province: José Ballivián Province
- Elevation: 899 ft (274 m)

Population (2012)
  - Total: 19,195
- Time zone: UTC-4 (BOT)

Rurrenabaque is a small town in the north of Bolivia, on the Beni River. It is the capital of Rurrenabaque Municipality. In recent years, it has become popular with international tourism as it is an easy gateway for visits to Madidi National Park, which is within the Bolivian rainforest. It also provides access to the surrounding pampas. Locals commonly refer to the town by its shortened nickname, "Rurre."

Rurrenabaque is located in José Ballivián Province in Beni Department, Bolivia. Rurrenabaque Municipality, the fourth municipal section of José Ballivián Province, had 19,195 inhabitants as of 2012, of which 13,446 lived in urban Rurrenabaque itself.

== Transportation ==
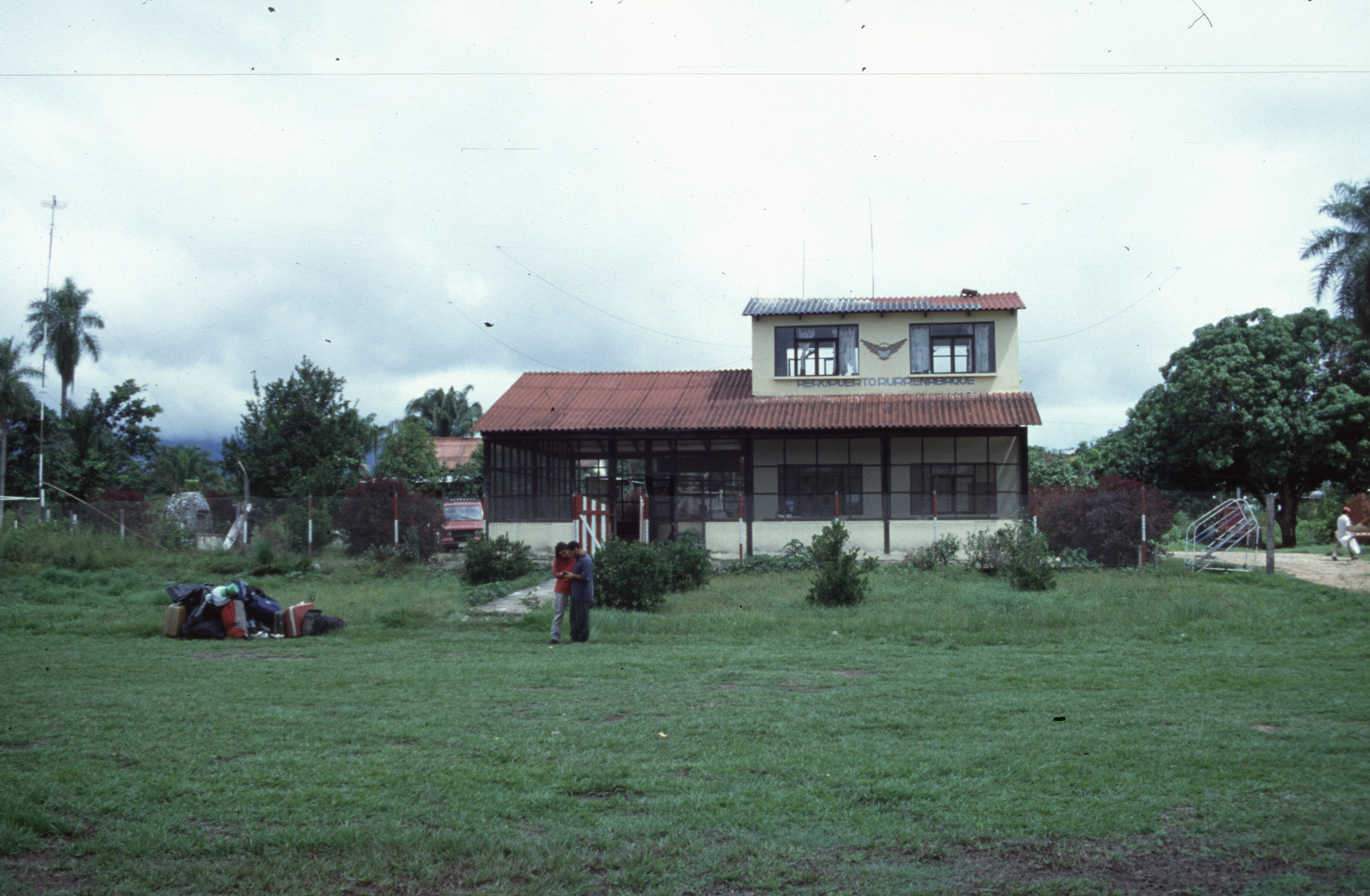
Rurrenabaque Airport

Rurrenabaque is reached by bus, 410 km (250 mi) from La Paz (18 hours), by hired taxi (12 hours), or by airplane (45 minutes to 1 hour). Ecojet offers flights to Rurrenabaque.

The buses from La Paz pass through Coroico, 70 km (43 mi) from La Paz. A new road on this route opened at the end of 2006, decreasing most motorized traffic on the older, more dangerous Yungas Road, also known as 'Death Road,' now highly popular for mountain bike tours.

Rurrenabaque Airport was paved in 2010. Sometimes, low clouds over nearby mountains can hinder planes' visibility and prevent them from landing.

A nearby airport can also be used, Reyes Airport, which is 32 kilometres (20 mi) away and about one hour by bus. There are no mountains near Reyes, and the airport often has better weather and fewer low clouds. Reyes is the capital of José Ballivián Province in the Beni Department.

Rurrenabaque lies on the east bank of the Beni River. A bridge over the Beni River connects with the town of San Buenaventura on the west bank. The bridge is a part of a regional road project promoted as a way to improve the economic relationship between the two towns, which had been described as stunted because of limited and expensive transport by boat. An argument in favor of the proposed bridge is that the shallows and strong currents at the San Buenaventura section limit the types of boats and motors capable of crossing the stretch of river, representing an investment beyond the means of most individual Bolivian families. A bridge would allow San Buenaventura to enjoy the same accessibility as that enjoyed between Rurrenabaque and the neighboring town of Reyes. Researchers cite economic and social harm for the area because of environmental damage from the road project and the location of the bridge, which may reduce the town's appeal as a destination or gateway for eco-tourists.

== Climate ==
Rurrenabaque sits on the Beni River as the waterway exits the Andean folds of western Bolivia into the Llanos de Moxos. The city has a tropical rainforest climate, bordering on a tropical monsoon climate with a noticeably drier part of the year. Rurrenabaque, like much of Bolivia, is subject to annual climactic variation, particularly as a result of climate change.

Climate data for Rurrenabaque (Rurrenabaque Airport), elevation 204 m (669 ft)
Month	Jan	Feb	Mar	Apr	May	Jun	Jul	Aug	Sep	Oct	Nov	Dec	Year
Mean daily maximum °C (°F)	31.4 (88.5)	31.1 (88.0)	31.5 (88.7)	31.1 (88.0)	29.3 (84.7)	28.1 (82.6)	28.4 (83.1)	30.5 (86.9)	32.0 (89.6)	32.6 (90.7)	32.1 (89.8)	31.8 (89.2)	30.8 (87.5)
Daily mean °C (°F)	26.6 (79.9)	26.4 (79.5)	26.4 (79.5)	25.7 (78.3)	23.9 (75.0)	22.6 (72.7)	22.1 (71.8)	23.4 (74.1)	25.0 (77.0)	26.4 (79.5)	26.6 (79.9)	26.7 (80.1)	25.2 (77.3)
Mean daily minimum °C (°F)	21.8 (71.2)	21.7 (71.1)	21.3 (70.3)	20.3 (68.5)	18.5 (65.3)	17.1 (62.8)	16.0 (60.8)	16.5 (61.7)	18.1 (64.6)	20.1 (68.2)	20.9 (69.6)	21.6 (70.9)	19.5 (67.1)
Average precipitation mm (inches)	318.2 (12.53)	306.6 (12.07)	241.2 (9.50)	157.9 (6.22)	131.2 (5.17)	129.3 (5.09)	87.9 (3.46)	73.0 (2.87)	77.2 (3.04)	135.2 (5.32)	192.8 (7.59)	256.1 (10.08)	2,106.6 (82.94)
Average precipitation days	15.1	14.6	13.6	9.3	9.2	9.0	6.6	4.9	5.4	8.0	10.2	12.7	118.6
Average relative humidity (%)	81.8	83.9	83.2	80.5	81.0	82.9	77.2	73.2	71.5	74.9	77.7	81.0	79.1
Source: Servicio Nacional de Meteorología e Hidrología de Bolivia

== Tourism ==
From Rurrenabaque, popular tours go to the jungle or rainforest ("selva" in Spanish) and to the pampas. The jungle or rainforest is south and west of Rurrenabaque (including a part of Madidi National Park), and the tours leave by boat and foot. There are many tour agencies in the town offering similar tours.

Rurrenabaque is a starting point for ecotourism, and some eco-lodges are found in the area. The following is a list of the community-based Eco-Lodges-: Mashaquipe; San Louis Grande (Mosetén); Berraco del Madidi (Quechua-Tacanas); San Miguel del Bala (Tacanas); Chalalán (Quechua-Tacanas); Mapajo (Tsiman-Mosetén).

Events, festivities: 2 February: Fiesta de Rurre - Anniversary of Rurrenabaque - The day of La Virgen de Candelaria.
