= Beni River =

Coordinates: 10.3821°S 65.3903°W

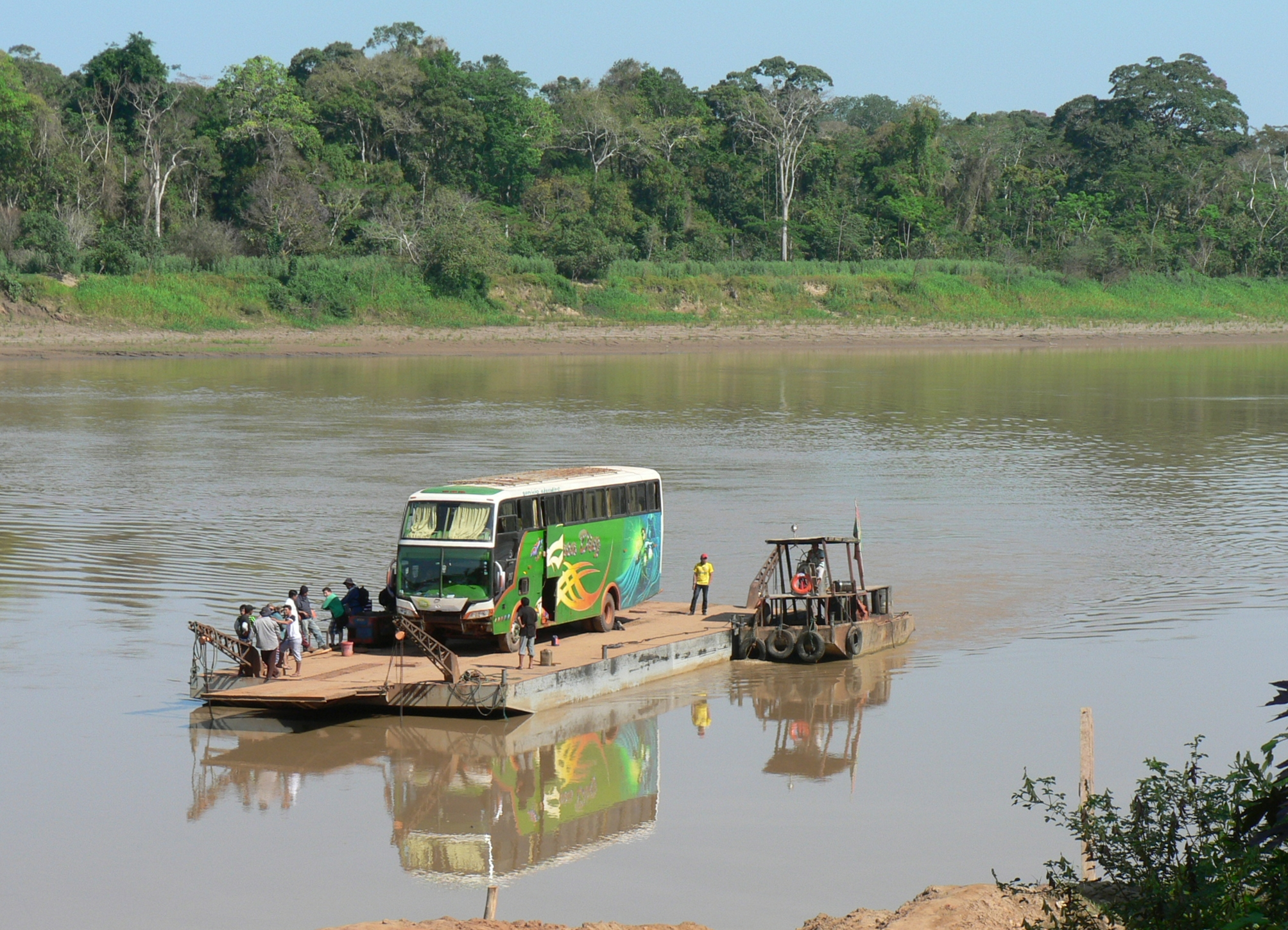

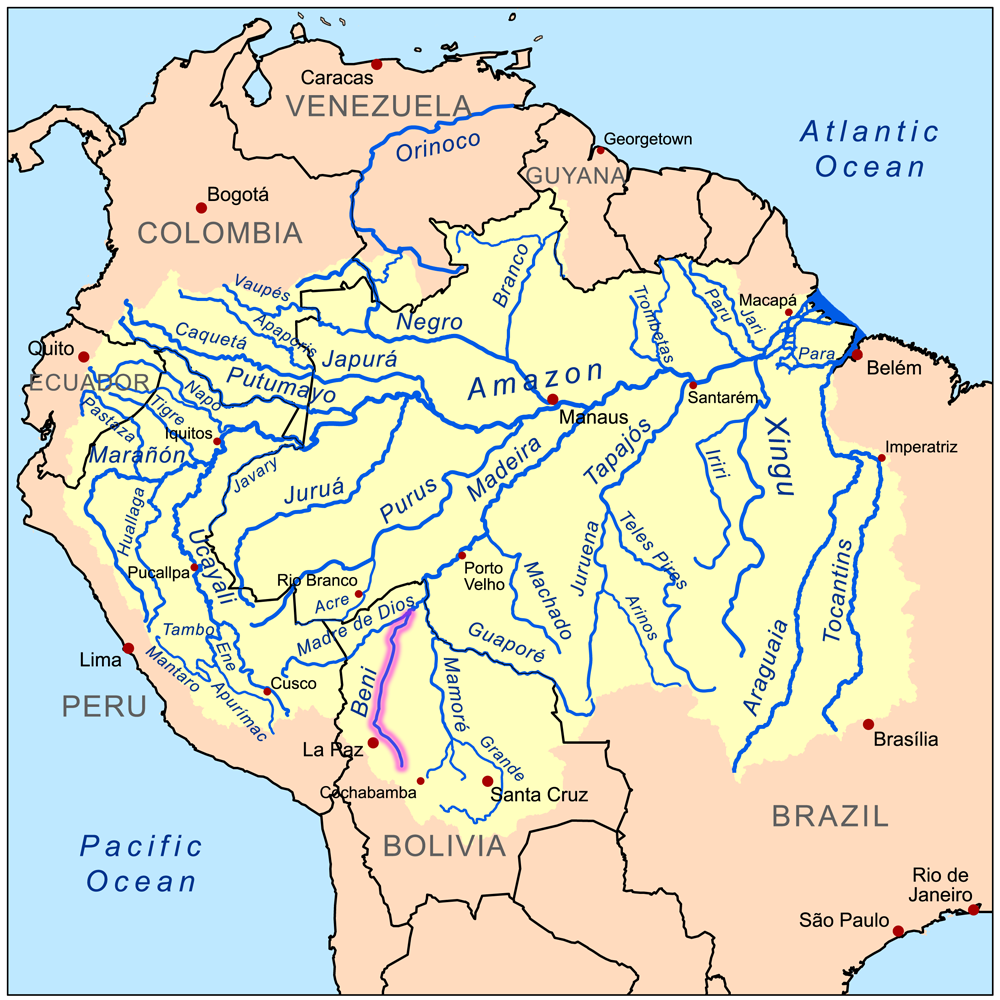
- Map of the Amazon Basin with the Beni River highlighted

Location
- Country: Bolivia, Brazil

Physical characteristics
- Source
  - location: La Paz Department, Bolivia
- Mouth: Madre de Dios River
  - location: near Riberalta, Bolivia–Brazil border
- Length: 1,100 km (680 mi)
- Discharge
  - location: mouth
  - average: 2,875 m^{3}/s (101,500 cu ft/s)

The Beni River (Spanish: Río Beni) is a river in the north of Bolivia.

It rises north of La Paz and flows northeast. The Madre de Dios River is where its mouth is at. In the upper portion of its course, it flows through highland forest and rainforest, where the rapids of Cachuela Esperanza interrupt the upstream navigability of the river. The middle river runs through dense rainforest where it is joined by the Madidi River and the Tuichi River which flow through Madidi National Park. The Tuichi River joins the Beni River upstream from the town Rurrenabaque. North of Rurrenabaque, the Beni River runs through the Llanos de Moxos also known as the Beni Savanna, which is named after the river. It empties into the larger Madre de Dios at Riberalta.

The Beni River has a number of minor tributaries, including intermittent streams such as the Emero River.

In 1947, the CIA received unverified information that suggested there were settlements of escaped Nazis along the Beni and its tributaries.
