= Pauserna =

Pauserna Guarasu
- Chief Fortunato in his headgear 1914, Orikoripe, close to Rio de Guaporé. Drawing by H. Kjellstedt.

Total population
- 250: 149 Guarasu’we in Bolivia (2024); 101 Guarasugwe in Brazil (2022)

Regions with significant populations

Languages
- Pauserna

Religion
- Roman Catholicism (often syncretic with Indigenous beliefs)

Related ethnic groups
- Guaraní, Warázu

The Pauserna (Guarasu, Warázu, Guarasugwé, or Guarasu’we) are an Indigenous people in Bolivia and Brazil who have historically lived along the upper Guaporé RIver, known as the Iténez River in Bolivia. There are three current cocmmunities: in Bella Vista in the southeastern part of Beni in Bolivia; in Picaflor in Santa Cruz department; and in Pimenteiras do Oeste in the Brazilian state of Rondônia.

The people derive the name Pauserna from the fact that the pao cerne tree is abundant in their area. Only a few of the older people speak the Pauserna language, which is closely related to Guaraní and is a member of the Tupí language family.

The Guarasugwé people were estimated to number 149 in Bolivia and 101 in Brazil according to recent census results.

== Name ==
Pauserna are also known as Araibayba, Carabere, Guarasug'we, Guarayuta, Itatin, Moterequoa, Pau Cerna and Pauserna-Guarasug'we.

== History ==
Most likely the Pauserna migrated to Bolivia from Paraguay centuries before when the Guaraní attacked the frontiers of the Incan empire. The Pauserna's ancestors are believed to be the Guaraní. Guarayos and Pauserna once made up a single group; one part of that group, the ancestors of the Guarayu, was moved into missions, and the other part remained independent and is known as the Pauserna. Their first significant contact with outside people came in the 1880s, when rubber tappers came to the area. When Erland Nordenskiöld visited them during his expedition in 1914 they were small in numbers as a result of diseases. He visited them on the Brazilian side of Rio Guaporé in a village called Orikoripe. Here lived eight families and except for these there were about 15 more families in the whole Pauserna area at the time. Most of those families lived on the Bolivian side. Their population went into a period of sustained decline in the twentieth century. From approximately 130 people in the 1930 the Pauserna declined to 60 people in 1965 to fewer than 30 in the 1970s.

== Communities ==
The Guarasu'wé people were estimated to number 149 in Bolivia and, named as the Guarasugwe people, 101 in Brazil according to recent census results. In the 2012 census they lived in 5 departments,15 provinces, and 19 municipalities in Bolivia.

Traditionally, the Warázu people had lived in the following 7 villages along the banks of the Guaporé River.

- Riozinho (Urukurɨ́ti) (on the banks of the Riozinho River, a tributary of the Guaporé River), Brazil
- Acurizal, Brazil
- Campo Grande (on the banks of the Paragúa River, a tributary of the Guaporé River), Bolivia
- Bella Vista, Bolivia
- Jangada, Bolivia
- Barranco Vermelho, Bolivia
- Flechas, Bolivia

Currently there is a substantial community in Pimenteiras do Oeste, Rondônia.

A Bolivian exhibition on the Guarasú'we names the following as major communities:

- Picaflor
- Porvenir
- Bella Vista
- Piso Firme
- Remanso

A new community of around 15 Guarasú'we families was established in Picaflor, Santa Cruz department, in 2016, when they arrived from Porvenir. A language revitalization effort is active there, led by Amalia Pereira and her sister Carmen Frey (Takva’sim), both granddaughters of community leader Miguel Frey. Pereira's language reconstruction effort draws on the knowledge of several elder relatives and resulted in the publication of an official alphabet in 2023. In Picaflor, the language is taught in a community school sponsored by the Bolivian government.

The Guarasú'we share the indigenous territory of Bajo Paraguá,with the Chiquitano people.

== Cultural traditions ==
=== Subsistance ===
Originally foragers, the Pauserna have since become horticulturists. They raised a great variety of food and other plants available before contact but now have ceased raising manioc and have adopted the cultivation of rice and caripo (yams). Groups clear and prepare fields for planting. Men plant maize, and women plant manioc and assist in the harvest. Some also collect rubber and ipecac, which is used to make pharmaceuticals. Nordenskiöld writes that the Pauserna enjoyed the meat of alligators.

=== Dwellings ===
The Pauserna once lived in multifamily dwellings but now live in single-family open sheds. Inside the house are food-storage platforms and cotton hammocks. For sitting, men have benches; women have mats.

=== Craft and clothes ===
The Pauserna make and wear bark cloth and woven cotton garments. Women spin cotton thread using a drop spindle and a vertical loom. Pots are made with clay tempered with crushed potsherds.

=== Society and culture ===
Boys were often scarified and bled to make them strong. Girls were secluded for a month at puberty, fed a restricted diet, and tattooed on their arms and breasts. Cross-cousin marriages and those between a man and his sister's daughter were preferred. A girl or woman could not marry without the consent of her father and brother. Polygyny was common. Postmarital residence was matrilocal at first, and then neolocal. Pregnant women had to observe certain food taboos. Fathers observed couvade by remaining in hammocks for three days following the birth of their children—it was believed that a child's soul follows the child's father and might be injured if it exerted itself immediately after birth. The dead were formerly buried in graves, over which a hut was built; today they are buried in their huts, wearing their paint and ornaments, wrapped up in mats, and facing west.

== Language ==
The Guarasú'we language is an endangered member of the Tupi–Guaraní language family, most closely releated to Sirionó and Yuki (Yuqui).
