= Kwaza =

Kwaza, or Coaiá, may refer to:

- Kwaza people, an indigenous people of Brazil
- Kwaza language, their language

== See also ==
- Kwasa (disambiguation)
- Koaia (disambiguation)
