= Warázu language =

Moribund Tupian language of Bolivia and Brazil

Warázu
- Pauserna
- Guarasuñée
- Native to: Bolivia
- Region: Rondônia, Brazil and Beni Department, Bolivia
- Ethnicity: 149 Guarasu’we in Bolivia (2024); 101 Guarasugwe in Brazil (2022)
- Native speakers: 4–5 (2017)
- Language family: Tupian: Tupi–Guarani; Guarayu; Warázu

Official status
- Official language in: Bolivia

Language codes
- ISO 639-3: psm
- Glottolog: paus1244
- ELP: Pauserna
- Linguasphere: 88-AAI-ca

Warázu, also known as Pauserna, Guarasú'we (in Bolivia), or Guarasugwé (in Brazil), is an endangered Tupi–Guaraní language of Brazil and Bolivia.

It is spoken by the Guarasugwé people, who were estimated to number 149 in Bolivia and 101 in Brazil according to recent census results. A 2017 linguistic investigation reported that the language had 4 or 5 active or passive speakers. There were 2 speakers in Pimenteiras do Oeste, in the Brazilian state of Rondônia, Brazil. There were also 2 or 3 speakers in Bella Vista, a town in Magdalena Municipality, Beni, on the banks of the Iténez River. Community leaders are involved in language revitalization efforts in both Bolivia and Brazil.

== Classification ==
Warázu is most closely related to Sirionó and Yuki (Yuqui). Ramirez (2017) places the classification of Warázu in the Guaraní subgroup of the Tupi-Guarani languages as follows:

- Guaraní subgroup
  - Guaraní
  - Tupinambá
  - Guarayu
  - Warázu-Sirionoid
    - Sirionoid (Sirionó, Yuqui, etc.)
    - Warázu

== Names ==
Speakers are also known as Guaraiutá, Guaraju, Pauserna, Guarasugwe, or Warazúkwe [waɾaðúkwe].

== Demographics ==
The language has been described as at high risk of extinction by anthropologists Erland Nordenskiöld in the early 20th century and by Jürgen Riester in 1974. Its extinction was even reported in 2004.

Ramirez and colleagues (2017) found only 2 remaining active speakers of Warázu, an elderly couple consisting of Känä́tsɨ [kənə́tsɨ] (José Frei Leite) and Híwa (Ernestina Moreno). They were born in Riozinho (Urukuríti) in Rondônia, Brazil, and moved back and forth between Brazil and Bolivia until finally settling in Pimenteiras do Oeste, Rondônia. They also documented two or three passive speakers in Bella Vista, Bolivia, including Mercedes and Carmelo and the older brother of Känä́tsɨ, "tio Juan."

Traditionally, the Warázu people had lived in the following 7 villages along the banks of the Guaporé River. However, the Warázu language is no longer spoken in these localities.

- Riozinho (Urukurɨ́ti) (on the banks of the Riozinho River, a tributary of the Guaporé River), Brazil
- Acurizal, Brazil
- Campo Grande (on the banks of the Paragúa River, a tributary of the Guaporé River), Bolivia
- Bella Vista, Bolivia
- Jangada, Bolivia
- Barranco Vermelho, Bolivia
- Flechas, Bolivia

A new community of around 15 Guarasú'we families was established in Picaflor, Santa Cruz department, in 2016, when they arrived from Porvenir. A language revitalization effort is active there, led by Amalia Pereira and her sister Carmen Frey (Takva’sim), both granddaughters of community leader Miguel Frey. Pereira's language reconstruction effort draws on the knowledge of several elder relatives and resulted in the publication of an official alphabet in 2023. In Picaflor, the language is taught in a community school sponsored by the Bolivian government.

== Phonology ==
Phonological inventory of Warázu:

=== Consonants ===
Warázu only has 11 consonants.

	Labial	Alveolar		Velar	Glottal
	Labial	plain	sibilant	Velar	Glottal
Nasal	m	n			
Plosive	p	t	t͡s	k	ʔ
Continuant		ð		w/kʷ	h
Trill		r			

Allophones:

- [ɲ], allophone of /n/
- [ɾʲ], allophone of /ɾ/
- [tʲ], allophone of /t/
- [ʝ], allophone of /ð/

=== Vowels ===
	Front	Central	Back
Close	i	ɨ	u
Mid	e	ə	o
Open		a	

Syllabic structure is (C)V or (C)VV.

== Pronouns ==
Warázu pronouns:

pronoun	Warázu
I	tsé
you (sg.)	né [á-pe]
we (excl.)	óre
we (incl.)	ðáne
you (pl.)	pé [peðó-pe]
he, she	áʔe
