= Masaka (disambiguation) =

Masaka is a city in Uganda.

Masaka may also refer to:

- Masaka District, a district of Uganda
- Masaka, Nasarawa, a town in Nigeria
- Masaka, Rwanda, a neighbourhood in the city of Kigali, Rwanda
- Masaka people, or Aikanã, an ethnic group of Brazil
- Masaka language, or Aikanã, a language of Brazil
- Masaka (character), a Star Trek character
- Masaka (horse), a racehorse

== See also ==
- Masaka Hospital (disambiguation)
- Massaka (disambiguation)
- Maska (disambiguation)
