= Guarayu languages =

Language group

Guarayu
- Tupi–Guarani subgroup II; Guarayo
- Geographic distribution: Bolivia and Brazil
- Linguistic classification: Tupian: Tupi–Guarani; Guarayu
- Subdivisions: Guarayu; Warázu; Sirionó–Yuqui–Jorá

Language codes
- Glottolog: tupi1278

The Guaráyu or Guaráyo languages (also known as Tupi–Guarani II) are a subgroup of the Tupi–Guarani language family.

== Languages ==
The Guarayu languages are:

- Guarayu
- Pauserna (Warázu)
- Sirionó (dialects: Yuqui, Jorá)

=== Rodrigues (2013) ===
Languages listed by Rodrigues (2013):

- Guarayo (Guarayú)
- Sirionó
- Horá (Jorá)

=== Rodrigues & Cabral (2012) ===
Languages listed by Rodrigues and Cabral (2012):

- Guaráyo (Guarayo, Guarayú)
- Sirionó
- Yúki

=== Dietrich (2010) ===
Languages listed by Dietrich (2010):

- Guarayo
- Guarasug’wä/Pauserna
- Sirionó
- Yuki / Mbyá-Jê
- Aché/Guayaki
