= Massaka =

Massaka may refer to:

- Massaka, the maintown of Kribi Premiere
- Massaka people, an ethnic group of Brazil
- Massaka language, a language of Brazil
- Massaka (rapper), Turkish rapper

== See also ==
- Masaka (disambiguation)
- Massacre (disambiguation)
