= Tubarão (disambiguation) =

Tubarão is a municipality in Santa Catarina state, Brazil.

Tubarão may also refer to:

- Tubarão River, a river in Santa Catarina state, Brazil
- Port of Tubarão, a port in Espírito Santo state, Brazil
- Tubarão people, an ethnic group of Rondônia state, Brazil
- Tubarão language, a language spoken in Rondônia state, Brazil
- Tubarão Futebol Clube, a Brazilian football club (not to be confused with Clube Atlético Tubarão)
- Bruno Tubarão, Brazilian football player
