= Jorá language =

Possibly extinct Tupian language of Bolivia

Jorá
- Hora
- Pronunciation: [hoˈra]
- Native to: Bolivia
- Region: near Baures, Beni Department
- Ethnicity: Jorá people
- Native speakers: 0–5 (2002)
- Language family: Tupian: Tupi–Guarani; Group II; Jorá

Language codes
- ISO 639-3: jor
- Glottolog: jora1240
- Linguasphere: 88-AAI-ae

Jorá (Hora) is a possibly extinct Tupi–Guaraní language of Bolivia. It is closely related to Sirionó and Yuqui and is a member of Group II. Its speakers were exterminated in a genocide perpetrated against them in the mid-20th century, and survivors of the Jorá do not use the language. Only 165 entries, including words and short sentences, were documented of the language. As a consequence, little of its grammatical structure is known.

== History ==
The Jorá people and language were never numerically large. In the 1940s, the Austrian anthropologist Wanda Hanke found out that the Jorá were being "hunted like animals" in a "systematic genocide". Previously, the Jorá had lived around Jara Lake near the town of Baures, inhabited by the Baure people, who feared their attacks. The Baure say they felt threatened by the Jorá and were therefore justified in their killings. The remaining Jorá were captured, "exposed like in a human zoo", and adopted by local families or sold into slavery, and the last speaker of their language is reported to have died in 1963, although the German anthropologist Jürgen Riester found five speakers as late as 1974. By 1995, only five Jorá remained. In 2002, Mily Crevels said that Jorá was "most probably extinct". The remaining descendants of the Jorá do not bring up their memories, even if asked. In one case, a Jorá woman who had been found orphaned as a child next to the dead bodies of her parents had been repeatedly asked to elicit some vocabulary of the Jorá language.

=== Documentation ===
The Jorá language is known solely from various vocabularies, mainly collected by non-linguists, totaling 165 "items, words, and short sentences"; the first was collected by Hanke and published in 1959, another was collected by François-Xavier Béghin in 1951 and published in 1980, and secondary data was collected in 2009 and 2011 from Baure people who had lived with the Jorá in the 1940s and 1950s.

== Classification ==
Jorá is a Tupi–Guarani language belonging to Group II of the family, within a subgroup with Sirionó and Yuqui. It has, in some classifications, been grouped as a dialect of Sirionó.

== Phonology ==
=== Vowels ===
Despite the fact that it is unattested in the corpus, the vowel [ɨ] was reported to have been much used by the Jorá, according to the Baure who remembered characteristics of Jorá. This vowel has been completely lost from Proto-Tupi-Guarani in Yuki and swapped with /i/ in Sirionó. It is thus assumed that [ɨ] was simply not distinguished by the collectors of the data.

== Morphology ==
Due to the poor attestation of Jorá, very little of the morphology can be identified of the language.

=== Person marking ===
A few personal or possessive markers may be postulated for Jorá:

se-nir
1SG.II-sister(?)
'my sister'

a-tʃi~tʃitʃa
1SG.I-RDPL~cut
'I cut myself'

Personal prefixes in Jorá
	Jorá
1SG.I	a-
1SG.II	tʃ(i)- / se- / tʃe, se
2SG.I	??
2SG.II	d- / de
3.I	?
3.II	e- / Ø

=== Tense–aspect–mood ===
The optative marker t- may be identified in Jorá:

t-a-sa
OPT-1SG.I-go
'Let me go.'

=== Modifiers ===
Modifiers in Jorá follow the noun, as is typical for languages of Group II of Tupi–Guarani:

d-ai didin-tʃi
2SG-finger little-ADJ
'your little finger'

=== Augmentative ===
The augmentative suffix in Jorá is found to be productive, and derives from Proto-Tupi-Guarani *(w)atʃú 'big':

ti-asu
pig-AUG
'wild pig'

bi-sú
snake-AUG
'snake (presumably anaconda)'

=== Reflexive ===
The reflexive prefix in Jorá is tʃi-, identical to that of Sirionó.

== Vocabulary ==
Swadesh list for Jorá
Number	Jorá
2	tvku
4	agařiřa; agriřv
10	ɛřa; dutšv́
19	sísv
20	ib̶i
23	séř-sv
26	tvʔtv
27	jířa
33	ayiři; saiyiři
34	sangi; sánkv
35	sɛntšv; santsv
37	ya
41	ɛřa
46	sake; sakį
50	tɛřuřu; sɛꟈuřu
52	sɛgvři; sɛ́yiři
54	nvřú
55	sangv
57	dɛ́l iv
59	zaku
62	díkera
67	sídɛt; ídɛt
70	tɛtvsi
72	yɛsitvʔtv
74	tɛndv
80	sinka
81	sɛřɛ
82	tša
83	atšvtšvtu
86	i
91	jura
97	iꟈia; denda
98	gvsi; yv́si
