= SRQ =

SRQ or srq may refer to:

- Sarasota, Florida, United States
- Sarasota–Bradenton International Airport (IATA airport code SRQ)
- South East Asian Airlines (SEAir), by ICAO code, Philippines
- Sirionó language, by ISO 639 code, spoken in Bolivia
- SRQ, a service request command in the IEEE-488 specification
