= Koaia =

Koaia may refer to:

- Koaia (plant), a Hawaiian tree species
- Koaiá people, an ethnic group of Brazil
- Koaiá language, a language of Brazil
