= Kwaza people =

Indigenous people in Brazil

Kwazá
Total population
- 40 (2008)

Regions with significant populations
- Brazil (Rondônia)

Languages
- Kwazá

Religion
- traditional tribal religion

Related ethnic groups
- Aikanã (through intermarriage)

The Kwazá (or Coaiá, Koaiá, Koaya, Kwaza, and Quaiá) are an Indigenous people of Brazil. Most Kwazá live with the Aikanã and Latundê in the Tubarão-Latundê Indigenous Reserve in the province of Rondônia; however, some Kwazá live in the Terra Indígena Kwazá do Rio São Pedro. In 2008 their population was 40, up from 25 in 1998.

Little is known about Kwaza people and language due to the minimal historical sources available; if mentioned in reliable documents, it is usually in reference to its neighbors. What is known, is that the Kwaza people were at one point a nation of a few thousand people, which could be subdivided into various groups.

== Language ==
As of 2005, 25 Kwazá people spoke the Kwazá language, an unclassified language.

== Geographical distribution ==
Rondônia is one of the smaller states of Brazil and shares a border with eastern Bolivia.

=== Historical ===
The history of the Kwaza people is one marked with tragedy, which may contribute to why their language is endangered. in the 1960s, the Kwaza people lost many of their members due to the opening of the BR-364, an inter-state highway in Brazil connecting the southeast states to the western states. Today there are only about 40 individuals, Kwaza, Aikanã and Latunde peoples, who have been living together for a number of decades in the south of Rondônia. These peoples also lived in the state of Rondônia and were also expelled from the fertile lands that they originally lived on, which may be why they live together now. The majority of the Kwaza have either been decimated or dispersed, and their culture destroyed by the national society which has been highly influenced by Western states. This may be the biggest conflict that the Kwaza people have faced, thus contributing to the endangerment and possible extinction of their language.

The traditional habitat of the Kwaza was the high forest in the Amazon, living and settling around rivers.

Due to the extremely limited documentation, combined with the semi-nomadic lifestyles of the Kwaza speakers and the lack of permanent settlements from a slash and burn agriculture, the historical location of the people is largely unknown. In addition, disease brought by Western contact and the imposed culture actively worked to destroy the local materials and societies. However, according to oral tradition and sporadic instances of documentation, the Kwaza lived along the São Pedro and Taboca rivers in addition to along the headwaters of the Pimenta Bueno River.

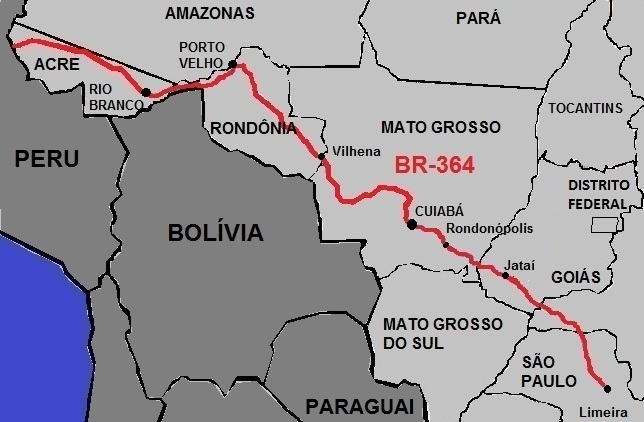
BR-364 Highway from Vilhelna to Porto Velho

Before contact with the "national society", the Kwaza held various rituals and activities. These included a several month isolation of young girls, anthropophagy, and the sport of head-ball. They decorated their bodies with shells, earrings, teeth, and painted their bodies with various dyes. Some of the Kwaza still plant bananas, manioc, peanuts, yams and tobacco. They also gather fruits and keep various types of animals such as monkeys, birds, and pigs as pets.

=== Modern day ===
In the modern day, speakers live on the Tubarão Latundê indigenous reserve. This lies on the headwaters of the Apediá or Pimenta Bueno River, in the southeast of the federal Brazilian state of Rondônia. Rondônia is part of the Guaporé region, the most diverse linguistic region of South America. Over 40 indigenous languages can be found here, including 8 unique macro-families, and possibly 10 isolates. However, like Kwaza, most of the languages here are endangered with extinction and are poorly documented.

Only three families speak the Kwaza language today. Two are scattered among the Aikanã within different indigenous terriroties, and one family is located in a Portuguese-speaking town. The Kwaza language is currently being transmitted to younger generations in two of the families.

== History ==
Kwazá people historically lived with the Aikanã, Kanoê, Tuparí, Sakurabiat, Salamãi, and other groups, that were culturally similar, even though their languages were not all mutually intelligible. These groups intermarried, battled with each other, and joined in festivals.

The Kwazá were forced off their traditional homelands by ranchers after the construction of BR-364 in the 1960s.

=== Interactions ===
==== Neighbors and invaders ====
The Kwaza people neighbored the Mekens/Sakurabiat, the Tupari, Aikanã and the Kanoê, both with unclassified languages, the Salamai of the Monde language family, and various others, several of which have gone extinct. Despite all the contact that the Kwaza people may have had with other indigenous peoples, Kwaza language not have a great amount of similarities to any other indigenous language. In fact, the Guapore region (where the Kwaza people lived), is known as one of the most linguistically diverse regions of South America, with numerous language families represented such as Tacana, Tupi, Pano, as well as ten unclassified languages, one of which is Kwaza.

The most prominent neighbors of Aikanã groups lived along Tanaru tributary, 20 km south, but all the groups in the area formed alliances across linguistic borders. The first contact with Euro-Americans is hypothesized to have been around the mid 16th century from Spanish expeditions. The middle of the 17th century offered Jesuit missionaries in Northeast Bolivia. A relationship of avoidance developed between Portuguese and indigenous people, flaring to hostility in cases of contact.

The 19th century rubber boom caused non-Indians to settle permanently in Rondônia, and the posture of avoidance and indifference turned into one of enslavement for the Kwaza people. The effects of this are seen in the turn of the language towards the Euro-Americans. Increased contact also caused detrimental epidemics among the indigenous populations. Occasionally the native groups believed the cause of the epidemics were instigated by sorcery of other tribes, which caused violent clashes between the groups and further dwindled numbers to the extreme.

When the highway B-364 opened, impoverished Brazilians, logging companies, and cattle ranchers infiltrated the area and forced the indigenous people off the best lands and onto reserves, further encouraging them to let go of their native language. By 2004, the indigenous population barely hits 5,000 out of a total population of 1.5 million.
