= Sirionó =

Miá

Total population
- 782 (2012)

Regions with significant populations
- Bolivia

Languages
- Sirionó language, Spanish

Religion
- traditional tribal religion, Christianity

Related ethnic groups
- Yuqui people

The Sirionó are an indigenous people of Bolivia. They primarily live in the forested northern and eastern parts of Beni and northwestern Santa Cruz departments of Bolivia. They live between the San Martín, Negro Rivers, and the Machado River.

== Name ==
"Sirionó" comes from a neighboring language, in which síri means "tucum palm". Their autonym is Miá, meaning "the people." They are also known as the Chori, Ñiose, Qurungua, Tirinié, or Yande people. The name "Chori" is a pejorative applied to them by the Guarayos, meaning roughly 'barbarians'. The Sirionós are tall and strong, although thin, due to the continuous movement and hardships of wildlife.

Their complexion is dark, although somewhat lighter than that of the Guarayos, probably because of their life in the shade of the trees. Some are said to have almost white skin, brown hair and light eyes. Its aspect is rather Arauco than Guarani.

== Language ==
The Sirionó language is a Guarayú language of the Tupí-Guaraní language family, written in the Latin script. The language is taught in primary schools. A whistled language has been observed among Sirionós.

== History ==
Sirionó people originated in the Gran Chaco and moved north in the Amazon rainforest. First contact with Spaniards was in the 1690s. Later Jesuits tried to missionize them and convince them to lead sedentary lives. Sirionó people died from diseases introduced by Europeans, and by the dawn of the 20th century, only 500 survived. They lived either in remote forests or worked as ranch or farm hands.

== Culture ==
Sirionó traditionally were semi-nomadic and fished, hunted, gathered wild plants, and farmed. They cultivated maize, sweet potatoes, and sweet cassava. They brewed beer from maize.

Traditional Sirionó houses were often only temporary structures with wooden supports and palm leaf roofs that could house up to 120 people at a time. Families were matrilineal and matrilocal, that is, young married couples would live in the wife's community.
