= PBQ =

PBQ may refer to:

- Painted Bride Quarterly, a Philadelphia-based literary magazine
- PBQ, the IATA code for Pimenta Bueno Airport, Brazil
