= Yuki language =

Yuki language may refer to:

- Yuqui language, also spelled Yuki, spoken by the Yuqui people in Bolivia
- Northern Yukian language, also called Yuki, spoken by the Yuki people in California
