= Yuqui =

Indigenous people of Bolivia

Yuquí Mbia
Total population
- 220 (2003)

Regions with significant populations
- Bolivia

Languages
- Yuqui language, Spanish

Religion
- traditional tribal religion

Related ethnic groups
- Sirionó people

The Yuqui are an indigenous people of Bolivia. They primarily live in the Santa Cruz and Cochabamba Departments of eastern Bolivia.

== Name ==
The Yuqui refer to themselves as Mbia, a Tupi-Guaraní term means "the people." "Yuqui" has been used by Spanish-speakers since the colonial period. A possibility is the word derived from "Yaqui," meaning "younger relative." They are also known as the Bia, Yuki, Yukí, or Yuquí people.

== History ==
Their first Spanish contact was in 1548. Linguists believe that Yuqui people may have separated from the Siriono people in the 17th century. According to their own history, Yuqui people experienced disease contracted from and warfare with local Bolivians. In the 1950s the Bolivian government came into conflict with Yuqui people.

Outsiders thought that Yuqui people were part of the Siriono people; however, after sustained contact in the 1960s, a Siriono language-speaker attempted to communicate to Yuquis and discovered they were a distinct ethnic group. In 1953, there were only 43 Yuquis, while in 1990, there were 130.

== Subsistence ==
Yuqui traditionally have been nomadic and fished, hunted, and foraged instead of farming. Today they hunt fish, farm, sell crafts, and work as paid laborers.

== See also ==
- Yuki-Ichilo River Native Community Lands
