= Rio Roosevelt State Forest =

State forest in Rondonia, Brazil from 1990 to 2010

- Floresta Estadual de Rendimento Sustentado Rio Roosevelt
- Location within Brazil
- Nearest city: Pimenta Bueno, Rondônia
- Coordinates: 11°34′30″S 60°28′55″W
- Area: 27,860 hectares (68,800 acres)
- Designation: State forest
- Created: 23 March 1990

The Rio Roosevelt State Forest (Portuguese: Floresta Estadual de Rendimento Sustentado Rio Roosevelt) was a state forest in the state of Rondônia, Brazil.

== Location ==
The Rio Roosevelt State Forest was in the municipality of Pimenta Bueno, Rondônia. The forest was on the western edge of the Aripuanã River basin. It was bounded by the Roosevelt Indigenous Territory to the north and the Roosevelt River to the east. The Parque Indígena do Aripuanã lay on the opposite side of the Roosevelt River. The forest was to be in the proposed South Amazon Ecotones Ecological Corridor. An Imazon study showed that as of 2005 the forest had lost 52% of its original vegetation. Another study showed 53% had been deforested as of July 2007.

== History ==
The Rio Roosevelt State Forest was created by state decree 4.569 of 23 March 1990 with an area of about 27,860 hectares (68,800 acres). On 31 May 2010 João Aparecido Cahulla, governor of the state, asked the legislative assembly to approve cancellation of the decree that created the forest based on recommendations of a study by a team of technicians. The request was approved on 13 July 2010, one of six conservation units cancelled at a special session of the assembly. The others were the Laranjeiras State Forest, Candeias State Park, Serra dos Parecis State Park, Rio Mequéns State Forest and Rio São Domingos State Forest. Final cancellation was by law 584 of 19 July 2010.

== Sources ==
- Ayres, José Márcio; Da Fonseca, Gustavo A. B.; Rylands, Anthony B.; Queiroz, Helder L.; Pinto, Luiz Paulo; Masterson, Donald; Cavalcanti, Roberto B. (2005), Os Corredores Ecológicos das Florestas Tropicais do Brasil (PDF) (in Portuguese), Sociedade Civil Mamirauá, archived from the original (PDF) on 2016-07-31
- Jensen, Pedro Diego (May 2011), Bacia Hidrográfica do Rio Aripuanã (PDF), vol. 1 - Texto Apêndice F - Avaliação Ambiental, Ministério de Minas e Energia, archived from the original (PDF) on 2016-03-05
- João Aparecido Cahulla (31 May 2010), Mensagem no 090 de 31 de Maio de 2010 (PDF) (in Portuguese)
- Millikan, Brent; Cardozo, Ivaneide Bandeira; Leroy, Jean Pierre; Caminha, Ludmila; Hargreaves, Maria Inês; Motta, Rogério Vargas; Alves, Vânia; Glass, Verena (2008), O Fim da Floresta?: A Devastação das Unidades de Conservação e Terras Indígenas no Estado de Rondônia (PDF), Grupo de Trabalho Amazônico - GTA Rondônia
- "Rondonia risca parques e reservas do mapa", O Eco (in Portuguese), 15 July 2010
- Silva, Jucicleide Theodoro da (2014), Revogação de unidades de conservação no estado de Rondônia – o caso da floresta estadual de rendimento sustentado do Rio Mequéns (PDF) (in Portuguese), Porto Velho/RO: Fundação Universidade Federal de Rondõnia
- Vicária, Luciana (10 July 2005), "Parques de papel", G1 Globo (in Portuguese), ISTOÉ
