= Native Community Lands =

Protected territories in Bolivia

Native Community Lands (Spanish: Tierra Comunitaria de Origen, acronym: TCO; also translated as Communal Lands of Origin), according to Bolivian law, are territories held by indigenous people through collective title. The creation of these territories has been a major goal of Bolivian indigenous movements and a political initiative pursued by both neoliberal and indigenous-identified national governments. TCOs are being included under the Indigenous Originary Campesino Autonomy regime. As of June 2009, 60 TCOs had been proposed in the lowlands, of which 12 had completed titling, and 143 had been proposed in the highlands, of which 72 had final titles. More than 16.8 million hectares have been incorporated within Native Community Lands as of December 2009, more than 15% of Bolivia's land area.

Titling of indigenous territories was propelled by the March for Territory and Dignity in July and August 1990, organized by the Confederation of Indigenous Peoples of the Bolivian East (CIDOB). This march demanded the recognition of four indigenous territories, which was granted through Supreme Decrees issued on 24 September 1990. State recognition was formalized through the 1993 Agrarian Reform Law, which authorized community land ownership and formalized Native Community Lands as the vehicle for this ownership. Responsibility for verifying and awarding title fell to the National Institute of Agrarian Reform. In the 1994 revision of the Constitution, indigenous rights to exercise "social, economic, and cultural rights" through Native Community Lands were recognized in Article 171. In the 2009 Constitution, Native Community Lands reappear as Indigenous Originary Campesino Territories in Article 403. A study by the Fundación Tierra found that while the Morales government has significantly advanced titling of Native Community Lands, it has resisted ensuring the constitution rights of TCO residents over the management of their territories and resources.

TCO	Location	Size (hectares)	Date Established	Established by	Indigenous Peoples	Previous Status
Sirionó Indigenous Territory		52,408.71 ha	24 September 1990	Supreme Decree 22609	Sirionó	
Isiboro Sécure National Park and Indigenous Territory	Cochabamba/Beni Department border	1,372,180 ha	24 September 1990	Supreme Decree 22610	Trinitario Mojeño, Yuracaré, Chimán	National Park (since 1965)
Multiethnic Indigenous Territory I	Beni	365,483.26 ha	24 September 1990	Supreme Decree 22611	Trinitario Mojeño, Ignaciano Mojeño, Movima, Yuracaré, Tsimané	
Chimán Indigenous Territory I	Beni	337,360.44 ha	24 September 1990	Supreme Decree 22611	Tsimané	
Pilón Lajas Biosphere Reserve and Communal Lands	Yungas region, northern La Paz Department and Beni	400,000 ha	9 April 1992	Supreme Decree 23110	Mosetén, Tsimané, Tacana	Biosphere Reserve (since 1977)
Chayantaka Native Community Lands	north Potosí	36,366.79	July 2005	INRA titling completed	Chayantaka ayllu	
Lomerío Chiquitano Indigenous Territory		259,188	9 April 1992; June 2006	Supreme Decree 23112; INRA Titling Complete	Chiquitano	
Monte Verde Chiquitano Indigenous Territory	Ñuflo de Chávez Province, Santa Cruz	947,440.8	3 July 2007	Titling completed and awarded	Chiquitano	
Araona Indigenous Territory			9 April 1992	Supreme Decree 23108		
Yuki-Ichilo River Native Community Lands	Cochabamba		9 April 1992; April 1997	Supreme Decree 23111; INRA Title RTIT00-000006	Yuki, Yuracaré, Trinitario, Movima	
Yuracaré Native Community Lands	Cochabamba	241,170.5			Yuracaré	
Avatiri Ingre Native Community Lands	Chuquisaca				Guaraní	
Avatiri Huacareta Native Community Lands	Chuquisaca				Guaraní	
Avatiri Ingre Native Community Lands	Chuquisaca				Guaraní	
Machareti-Ñancaroinza-Carandayti Native Community Lands	Chuquisaca				Guaraní	
Itikaraparirenda Native Community Lands	Chuquisaca				Guaraní	
Alto Parapetí Native Community Lands	Santa Cruz				Guaraní	Ranches with Guaraní in conditions of servitude
Nor Lípez Native Community Lands	Nor Lípez Province, Potosí	2,000,291	19 April 2011	INRA titling completed	Central Única Provincial de Comunidades Originarias de Nor Lípez	
Jatun Ayllu-Juchuy Ayllu-Chaupi Ayllu Native Community Lands	Sur Lípez Province, Potosí	1,557,532	19 April 2011	INRA titling completed	Jatun Ayllu, Juchuy Ayllu, Chaupi Ayllu indigenous communities	
Enrique Baldivieso Native Community Lands	Enrique Baldivieso Province, Potosí	227,003	19 April 2011	INRA titling completed	Central Única de la Provincia de Comunidades Originarias Enrique Baldivieso	

== links ==
- List and maps of TCO in 2000
