= Maska =

Maska may refer to:

- Maska (2009 film), an Indian Telugu-language action film
- Maska, a 2010 animated film based on Lem's short story The Mask
- Maska (2020 film), an Indian Hindi-language film by Neeraj Udhwani
- Maska (album), a 1998 album by Greek artist Glykeria
- Maska (rapper), member of French rap band Sexion d'Assaut
- Maska (Hazara tribe), a tribe of the Hazara people, found in Afghanistan and neighboring countries
- Maska (company), Canadian power transmission product manufacturer, a member of the ABB Group

== See also ==
- Masaka (disambiguation)
