= Serra dos Parecis State Park =

Former state park in Rondônia, Brazil

- Parque Estadual Serra dos Parecis
- IUCN category II (national park)
- Location within Brazil
- Nearest city: Alto Alegre dos Parecis, Rondônia
- Coordinates: 11.874677°S 62.057637°W
- Designation: State park
- Created: 23 March 1990
- Administrator: (defunct)

The Serra dos Parecis State Park (Portuguese: Parque Estadual Serra dos Parecis) was a state park in the state of Rondônia, Brazil. It was meant to protect an area of Amazon rainforest, but after being abandoned for twenty years it was cancelled in 2010.

== Location ==
The Serra dos Parecis State Park was in the municipality of Alto Alegre dos Parecis, Rondônia. It had an area of 38,950 hectares (96,200 acres). The park was in the Amazon biome. Vegetation was 73.56% open rainforest, 19.38% savanna and 7.06% seasonal semi-deciduous forest.

== History ==
The Serra dos Parecis State Park was created by state decree 4,570 of 23 March 1990. It was administered by the Secretaria de Estado do Desenvolvimento Ambiental. The park was one of several conservation units created in 1990 under PLANAFLORO, subsequently abandoned to land grabbing and deforestation, and then cancelled.

On 13 July 2010 an extraordinary session of the Legislative Assembly of Rondônia convened by Governor João Cahulla approved repeal of the decrees that had created six protected areas. These were the Rio Roosevelt State Forest, Laranjeiras State Forest, Candeias State Park, Serra dos Parecis State Park, Rio Mequéns State Forest and Rio São Domingos State Forest. The decree creating the park was revoked by law 588 of 19 July 2010, which meant that the park is now legally defunct.

== Sources ==
- Legislação Estadual (in Portuguese), Ministério Público do Estado de Rondônia
- Parque Estadual Serra dos Parecis (in Portuguese), Via Rural, archived from the original on December 20, 2016
- PES Serra dos Parecis (in Portuguese), ISA: Instituto Socioambiental
- "Rondonia risca parques e reservas do mapa", O Eco (in Portuguese), 15 July 2010
- Silva, Jucicleide Theodoro da (2014), Revogação de unidades de conservação no estado de Rondônia – O caso da floresta estadual de rendimento sustentado do Rio Mequéns (PDF) (thesis) (in Portuguese), Porto Velho/RO
