= Alto Alegre dos Parecis =

Municipality in Rondônia, Brazil

- Municipality
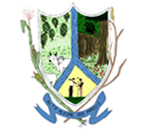
- Flag Coat of arms

- Location in Rondônia state

- Location in Brazil
- Coordinates: 12°7′40″S 61°51′3″W
- Country: Brazil
- Region: North
- State: Rondônia

Area
  - Total: 3,958 km^{2} (1,528 sq mi)

Population (2020)
  - Total: 13,255
  - Density: 3.349/km^{2} (8.674/sq mi)
- Time zone: UTC−4 (AMT)

Alto Alegre dos Parecis (Brazilian Portuguese: [ˈawtu aˈlɛɡɾi dus paɾeˈsis]) is a municipality located in the Brazilian state of Rondônia. Its population was 13,255 (2020) and its area is 3,958 km^{2}.

The municipality contains 20% of the 384,055-hectare (949,020-acre) Corumbiara State Park, created in 1990. It also contained the 38,950-hectare (96,200-acre) Serra dos Parecis State Park, created in 1990 and cancelled in 2010.

== See also ==
- List of municipalities in Rondônia
