= Yuki-Ichilo River Native Community Lands =

Collectively-owned indigenous territory in Bolivia

The Yuki–Indigenous Council of the Ichilo River Native Community Lands (Spanish: Tierra Comunitaria de Origen Yuqui-Consejo Indígena Río Ichilo, abbreviated TCO Yuqui-CIRI), originally the Yuki Indigenous Territory, is a collectively-owned indigenous territory in the province of Carrasco, Cochabamba, Bolivia, registered as a Native Community Land and titled by the National Agrarian Reform Institute in April 1997. Residents of the territory belong to the Yuki, Yuracaré, Trinitario, and Movima peoples. The titled territory consists of 115,924.9 hectares and had a population of 778 as of 2010.

There are six indigenous communities located within the territory: Bia Recuaté (Yuki), Tres Islas, Puerto Las Flores, Tres Bocas (Yuracare), Capernaum (Movima), and Santa Isabel (Trinitario).

== See also ==
- Indigenous peoples in Bolivia
