= Cerejeiras =

Municipality in Rondônia, Brazil

- Municipality
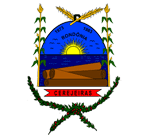
- Flag Coat of arms

- Location in Rondônia state

- Location in Brazil
- Coordinates: 13°11′20″S 60°48′44″W
- Country: Brazil
- Region: North
- State: Rondônia

Area
  - Total: 2,783 km^{2} (1,075 sq mi)

Population (2020)
  - Total: 16,204
  - Density: 5.822/km^{2} (15.08/sq mi)
- Time zone: UTC−4 (AMT)

Cerejeiras is a municipality located in the Brazilian state of Rondônia. Its population was 16,204 (2020) and its area is 2,783 km^{2}.

The municipality contains 28% of the 384,055-hectare (949,020-acre) Corumbiara State Park, created in 1990.

== See also ==
- List of municipalities in Rondônia
