= Kwasa =

Kwasa may refer to:

- Kwasa Damansara, a township development in Malaysia
- Kwassa kwassa, a dance rhythm from the Democratic Republic of Congo
- Khulna Water Supply & Sewerage Authority, a government-owned water supplier organization

== See also ==
- Kwaza (disambiguation)
