= Pimenta Bueno =

Municipality in Rondônia, Brazil

- Municipality
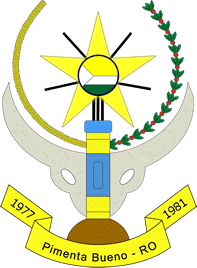
- Flag Coat of arms

- Location in Rondônia state

- Location in Brazil
- Coordinates: 11°40′21″S 61°11′37″W
- Country: Brazil
- Region: North
- State: Rondônia

Area
  - Total: 6,241 km^{2} (2,410 sq mi)

Population (2020)
  - Total: 36,881
  - Density: 5.909/km^{2} (15.31/sq mi)
- Time zone: UTC−4 (AMT)

Pimenta Bueno is a municipality located in the Brazilian state of Rondônia. Its population was 36,881 (2020) and its area is 6,241 km^{2}.

The municipality contained the 27,860-hectare (68,800-acre) Rio Roosevelt State Forest, created in 1990 and cancelled in 2010.

The city is served by Pimenta Bueno Airport.
