= Corumbiara State Park =

State park in Rondônia, Brazil

- Parque Estadual de Corumbiara
- IUCN category II (national park)
- Location within Brazil
- Nearest city: Pimenteiras do Oeste, Rondônia
- Coordinates: 13.152430°S 61.859325°W
- Area: 384,055 hectares (949,020 acres)
- Designation: State park
- Created: 23 May 1990
- Administrator: Secretaria de Estado do Desenvolvimento Ambiental

The Corumbiara State Park (Portuguese: Parque Estadual de Corumbiara) is a state park in the state of Rondônia, Brazil.

== Location ==
The Corumbiara State Park is divided between the municipalities of Pimenteiras do Oeste (51.78%), Alto Alegre dos Parecis (19.82%) and Cerejeiras (28.4%) in the state of Rondônia. It has an area of 384,055 hectares (949,020 acres). It is in the south of the state along the border with Bolivia, which is defined by the Guaporé River. The Mequéns River defines the northwest boundary. The Rio Mequéns Indigenous Territory adjoins the park to the north. The park has three support stations on the Guaporé river and another in the town of Pimenteiras do Oeste. The reserve would be included in the proposed Western Amazon Ecological Corridor.

== Environment ==
Average elevations are 100 to 200 metres (330 to 660 ft). 70% of the park is subject to periodic flooding. It is in an area of transition between the Amazon rainforest, pantanal and cerrado. There is a range of vegetation types including alluvial forest with emergent canopy, pioneer alluvial formations, savanna parkland, open and dense savanna and open lowland rainforest. About 50% is cerrado, with 28% forest and 22% aquatic. Although no comprehensive survey has been made of the fauna, during preparation of the management plan 57 species of mammals were identified, 173 of birds and 20 of reptiles. There is some evidence of uncontacted Indians in the park. As of 1999 the park was constantly threatened by fires and illegal hunting.

== History ==
The Corumbiara State Park was created by state governor decree 4.576 of 23 May 1990, with an area of about 586,031 hectares (1,448,110 acres). It was to be administered by the Rondônia State Forestry Institute, an agency linked to the Secretariat of State for the Environment (SEMARO). The Instituto Nacional de Colonização e Reforma Agrária (INCRA – National Institute for Colonization and Agrarian Reform) issued land purchase and sale contracts in 1991–92 which forced reduction of the park area by 152,215 hectares (376,130 acres), removing protection from the headwaters of the rivers that drain into the park. Law 690 of 27 December 1996 adjusted the boundaries of the park, reducing it to 424,339 hectares (1,048,560 acres).

Law 1.171 of 31 December 2002 again altered the limits, reducing it to 384,055 hectares (949,020 acres). Federal act 91 of 30 June 2004 gave preliminary approval to assign 181,700 hectares (449,000 acres) of federal union land for use by the state of Rondônia in creating the park. The state was to avoid isolating the area containing the town of Laranjeiras. The consultative council was created by decree 14926 of 25 February 2010. A revised management plan was approved on 17 September 2010. On 2 July 2012 SEMARO entered a mutual cooperation agreement for managing the park with the Centro de Estudos da Cultura e do Meio Ambiente da Amazônia (RIOTERRA). As of 2016 the park was supported by the Amazon Region Protected Areas Program.

== Sources ==
- Ayres, José Márcio; Da Fonseca, Gustavo A. B.; Rylands, Anthony B.; Queiroz, Helder L.; Pinto, Luiz Paulo; Masterson, Donald; Cavalcanti, Roberto B. (2005), Os Corredores Ecológicos das Florestas Tropicais do Brasil (PDF) (in Portuguese), Sociedade Civil Mamirauá, archived from the original (PDF) on 2016-07-31
- Bóçon, Roberto (1999), "Avifauna do Parque Estadual de Corumbiara, Rondônia-Brazil", Manejo y Conservación de Fauna Silvestre en America Latina, Santa Cruz de la Sierra
- Full list: PAs supported by ARPA, ARPA
- PES de Corumbiara (in Portuguese), ISA: Instituto Socioambiental
