= Pimenta Bueno Airport =

Euflávio Odilon Ribeiro Airport Aeroporto Euflávio Odilon Ribeiro
- IATA: PBQ; ICAO: SWPM; LID: RO0009

Summary
- Airport type: Public
- Serves: Pimenta Bueno
- Opened: 21 December 2012
- Time zone: BRT−1 (UTC−04:00)
- Elevation AMSL: 208 m (682 ft)
- Coordinates: 11°38′29″S 061°10′44″W

Map
- Location in Brazil PBQ (Brazil)

Runways
Direction	Length		Surface
Direction	m	ft	Surface
04/22	1,300	4,265	Asphalt
- Sources: ANAC, DECEA

Euflávio Odilon Ribeiro Airport (IATA: PBQ, ICAO: SWPM) is the airport serving Pimenta Bueno, Brazil.

== History ==
The airport was inaugurated on December 21, 2012.

== Airlines and destinations ==
Airlines	Destinations
Azul Conecta	Porto Velho

== Access ==
The airport is located 6 km (4 mi) from downtown Pimenta Bueno.

== See also ==
- List of airports in Brazil
