= Wanda Hanke =

Austrian physician and ethnologist (1893–1958)

Wanda Theresia Leokadia Hanke (9 December 1893, in Troppau – 31 August 1958, in Benjamin Constant, Amazonas) was an Austrian physician and ethnologist, specialising in the indigenous peoples of South America.
