= Kanoê language =

Endangered indigenous language of Brazil

Kanoé
- Kapishana
- Kapixaná
- Native to: Brazil
- Region: Rondônia
- Ethnicity: 319 Kanoê (2014)
- Native speakers: 3 (2012)
- Language family: Language isolate

Language codes
- ISO 639-3: kxo
- Glottolog: kano1245
- ELP: Kapixaná
- 86-FAA-aa

Kanoê or Kapishana is a nearly extinct language isolate of Rondônia, Brazil. It is nearly extinct, with only 5 speakers in a population of about 319 Kanoê people. The Kapishana people now speak Portuguese or other indigenous languages from intermarriage. The language names are also spelled Kapixana, Kapixanã, and Canoé, the last shared with Awa-Canoeiro. The Kanoê people, although disperse in the southeastern part of the state of Rondônia, live mainly along the Guaporé River.

== Classification ==
Although Kanoê is generally considered to be a language isolate, there have been various proposals linking it with other languages and language families.

Van der Voort (2005) observes similarities among Kanoê, Kwaza, and Aikanã, but believes the evidence is not strong enough to definitively link the three languages together as part of a single language family.

Price (1978) proposes a relationship with the Nambikwaran languages, while Kaufman (1994, 2007) suggests that Kunza is related.

== Language contact ==
Jolkesky (2016) notes that there are lexical similarities with Kwaza, Aikanã, and the Nambikwaran languages due to contact.

== Current status ==
For a long time Kanoê was too poorly attested to classify. Various proposals were advanced on little evidence; Price (1978) for example thought Kanoê might be one of the Nambikwaran languages. When it was finally described in some detail, by Bacelar (2004), it turned out to be a language isolate.

The first written study of the Kanoê language available today, dates back to 1943 when Stanislav Zach published a vocabulary of the Kanoê tribe, which was later republished in 1963 by Cestmír Loukotka.

A preliminary report of the phonological features of the Kanoê language was published by Laércio Bacelar in 1992, with a second report and an analysis of the phonology published in 1994. Bacelar and Cleiton Pereira wrote a paper on the morphosyntax of the language in 1996. And in 1998 a paper on the negation and litotes of the language was published by Bacelar and Augusto Silva Júnior. Since then, Laércio Bacelar has been the main linguist investigating the language and working alongside the Kanoê people. In 2004 he published a detailed description of its phonology, grammar and syntax.

A project called Etnografia e Documentação da Lingua Kanoé is underway with a lexicographic and ethnographic approach to record auditory and written data of the Kanoê language. The project is currently coordinated by Laércio Nora Bacelar, a Brazilian linguist, and is funded by FUNAI - Museu do Índio and by UNESCO. The project also has the support of the entire Kanoê community from both the Guaropé and the Omorê rivers.

== Phonology ==
=== Consonants ===
	Bilabial	Alveolar	Palatal	Velar
Stop	p	t		k
Affricate		t͡s		
Fricative	β			x
Nasal	m	n	ɲ	
Approximant			j	w
Flap		ɾ		

/x/ is limited to a few verb forms, where it occurs before /ĩ/. /ts/ is highly variable, [ts tʃ s ʃ], with the affricates being the more common, [ʃ] rare, and [tʃ ʃ] most common before /i u/. /r/ is [ɾ] between vowels, [d] after [n] and occasionally initially. /ɲ/ varies as [ȷ̃]. /n/ is [ŋ] before /k/, a pattern which occurs during metathesis. /p/ is very rarely realized as [ɓ]. /w/ /j/ are nasalized after nasal vowels.

=== Vowels ===
	Front		Central		Back	
	plain	nas.	plain	nas.	plain	nas.
Close	i	ĩ	ɨ	ɨ̃	u	ũ
Mid	e	ẽ	ə	ə̃	o	õ
Open	æ	æ̃	a	ʌ̃		

Vowel qualities are /i e æ ɨ ə a u o/, all oral and nasal; the nasal vowels have slightly different or variable pronunciations: [ĩ], [ɛ̃]~[ẽ], [æ̃], [ɨ̃], [ã]~[ʌ̃], [ɔ̃]~[õ], [ũ].

Oral vowels are optionally nasalized next to nasal stops, with the variation of phonemically nasal vowels. /e/ varies as [ɛ]~[e] after /ts/ and next to an approximant. /ɨ/ varies as [ɨ]~[ə] after voiceless consonants. /o/ varies as [ɔ]~[o] after /p, m/. Vowels may have a voiceless offglide (effectively [h]) when not followed by a voiced sound.

Vowels are long when they constitute a morpheme of their own. Stress is on the last syllable of a word. Maximally complex syllable is CGVG, where G is a glide /j w/, or, due to epenthesis in certain morphological situations or to elision, the final consonant may be /m n/. One of the more syllabically complex words is /kwivejkaw/ 'to shave'. Vowel sequences occur, as in /eaere/ 'chief'.

== Morphology ==
Kanoê is a polysynthetic language, where the more complex words are the verbs (Payne 1997). It is also primarily an agglutinative language, and many words are formed by simple roots, juxtaposition and suffixation. The gender can be expressed by suffixation or by a hyperonym, and while Kanoê does not make a distinction of number, it does make a distinction between uncountable and countable nouns, where the suffix {-te} is added . The syntax order of Kanoê follows SOV = subject + object + verb.

In the Kanoê language, the process of morphological reduplication is used to form frequentative verbs. For example, manamana 'kneading', or mañumañu 'chewing'. Although some names show reduplication, it can have an onomatopoeic motivation instead of a morphologic one—most names with reduplication are names for animals and birds, in which the phonetic sequence of the reduplication do seem to imitate the sounds characteristic of said animals, for example kurakura 'chicken' or tsõjtsõj 'hummingbird'.

=== Pronouns ===
==== Personal pronouns ====
Personal pronouns in the Kanoê language follow a monomorphic free form in the singular and bimorphic in the plural. These pronouns can occur in the subject or object position. The formation of the plural pronouns follow the formula PRO.PL → PRO.SG + COL, where PRO is the singular form of the pronoun and -COL is the plural morpheme {-te}.

Personal pronoun
	Singular	Plural
1st person	ai	aite
2nd person	mi	mite
3rd person	oj	ojte

For example:

aj {ore õ-ry} e-re
1SG tire-1-REFL DECL-AUX
"I am tired."

ajte {ore õ-ry} e-re
1PL tire-1-REFL DECL-AUX
"We are tired."

aj mi vara-õ-ro-pe-to õ-ke-re
1SG 2SG speak-1-CLV-2-TR 1-NEG-DECL-AUX
"I don't speak with you."

==== Possessive pronouns ====
The form for possessive pronouns are monomorphic in the POSS.1SG ña and POSS.2SG pjs but bimorphic for POSS.3SG oho which is formed by 3SG oj plus the possessive {-o}. The plural form for the possessive pronouns are formed by adding the suffix {-to} which in itself is the result of the suffixes {-te} plus {-o}.

Possessive pronouns
	Singular		Plural	
1st person	ña	mine	jato	ours
2nd person	pja	yours	pjato	yours
3rd person	ojo	his/hers	ojoto	theirs

For example:

ña i-kɨ̃j vaj-õ-kɨ̃j e-re
POSS.1SG RN-eye sting-1-eye DECL-AUX
"My eye stings."

pjato kan-te iriri-ø-ro n-e-re
POSS.2PL child-COL run-2-CLV 3-DECL-AUX
"Your children are running."

==== Demonstrative pronouns ====
There are only two demonstrative pronouns in the Kanoê language, jũ, "this" for objects in close proximity and ũko, "that" for objects at a distance. The demonstrative pronouns do not make a distinction between number or gender.

For example:

jũ ævo ereã k-e-re
DEM.prox man big NEG-DECL-AUX
"This man is short (lit. This man is not tall)."

mi ũko itevæ pi-patenũ-ø-to k-e-re
2SG DEM.dist people 2-know-3-TR NEG-DECL-AUX
"You don't know that man."

==== Indefinite pronouns ====
There are a total of four indefinite pronouns, which are used based on the object. The nuvi and tsyke pronouns can be used with the gender suffix {-kɨ̃j} for masculine and {-nake} for feminine.

For humans		For non-humans	
nuvi	who/someone	naj	something
tsyke	someone else	tsake	something else

For Example:

tsyke -kɨ̃j tũ-o e-re
Someone else-M die-INTR DECL-AUX
"Someone else died."

oj naj topi-e u-ro e-re
3SG something rotten-NMLZ eat-CLV DECL-AUX
"He ate something bad."

== Syntax ==
The Kanoê language is a nominative-accusative language, given that the subjects of both transitive and intransitive verbal actions are marked the same way, while the object is marked differently. For subjects of either intransitive or transitive verbal actions, the suffix {-ro} 'CLV' is added to the verb, and for direct objects of transitive sentences, the suffix {-to} 'TR' is added to the verb.

For example:

kani iriri-ø-ro e-re
child run-3-CLV DECL-AUX
"The child ran."

pja e ña kani vara-ø-ro-ø-to n-e-re
POSS.2SG woman POSS.1SG child speak-3-CLV-3-TR 3-DECL-AUX
"Your woman is speaking with my child."

In example a. it can be seen that the intransitive verb {iriri-} "run" takes one subject kani "child", and the morpheme {-ro} which attaches the subject as the agent of the verbal action. In example b. the transitive verb {vara-} "speak" takes a subject, pja e "your woman", which the morpheme {-ro} attaches as the subject of the verbal action; and an object, ña kani "my child", which the morpheme {-to} attaches as the object of the verbal action. Examples a. and b. show that the morphemes for subjects of transitive or intransitive verbal actions are the same.

jato atiti epæ-ro n-e-re
POSS.1PL corn born-3-CLV 3-DECL-AUX
lit. "Our corn is being born."

ævo atiti paj-ø-ro e-re
man corn break-3-TR DECL-AUX
"The man harvested the corn." (lit. "The man broke the corn")

Comparing examples c. and d. it can be seen that the morpheme {-ro} is used when atiti "corn" is the subject of the verbal action, and {-to} is used when atiti "corn" is the object of the verbal action. It shows that morphemes for subjects and objects of verbal actions are different.

== Semantics ==
A field study by Bacelar (2004), shows that there are no inflections for number in the language. even though the Kanoê language uses the pluralizer {-te} to interpret nouns as a collective derived by the suffixation. Mass nouns cannot be pluralized.

kani	kani-te
child	children

kwini	kwini-te
fish	school of fish

=== Quantifier ===
The most used method to express quantity in the Kanoê language is the anteposition of the quantifier arakere "many". It is presumed that the quantifier arakere is formed by a litotes mechanism and that its internal structure follows {ara-} "few" + {-k} 'NEG' + {-e} 'DECL' + {-re} 'AUX'.

kani	arakere kani
child	many children

mapi	arakere mapi
arrow	many arrows

aj {ara k-e-re} kani õ-tsi mo-e-re
1SG few-NEG-DECL-AUX child 1-have APL-DECL-AUX
"I have many children."

oj tu-kwæ̃ ara-tũ-kwæ̃ k-e-re
3PL brother-MASC few-brother-MASC NEG-DECL-AUX
"He has many brothers." (lit. "He has not few brothers")

The quantifier arakere can also be used together with numerals to change its meaning to "few":

mini aj [mow-mow {ara k-e} mapi] õ-tsi mo-e-re
today 1SG two-two few-NEG-NMZ arrow 1-have APL-DECL-AUX
"Today I have only four arrows."

aj re õ-e-re [pja {ara k-e} uromu]
1SG kill 1-DECL-AUX one few-NEG-NMZ alligator
"I killed only one alligator."

The Kanoê language also has an interrogative quantifier nẽtoe "how many" which is used at the beginning of the sentence:

nẽtoe kani tuvo ni-tsi
{how many} child sick 3-INT
"How many children are sick?"

nẽtoe kani mi pe-tsi mi-tsi
{how many} child 2SG 2-have 2-INT
"How many children do you have?"

== See also ==
- Macro-Paesan languages
