= Massacre (disambiguation) =

A massacre typically refers to an event with a heavy death toll. Massacre may also refer to:

== Arts, entertainment, and media ==
=== Fictional characters ===
- Massacre (DC Comics), a DC Comics villain
- Massacre (Marvel Comics), a Spider-Man villain

=== Films ===
- Massacre (1934 film), a drama film starring Richard Barthelmess
- Massacre (1956 film), a Western film starring Dane Clark
- Massacre (aka Massacro) a 1989 Italian horror film directed by Andrea Bianchi
- Massacre (franchise), three series of slasher films spanning from 1982 to 2015
- The Massacre (film) 1912

=== Music ===
==== Groups and labels ====
- Massacre (Argentine band), an Argentine skate punk band
- Massacre (experimental band), an American experimental/rock band
- Massacre (death metal band), an American death metal band
- Massakre (band), a Chilean thrash metal band, or a self-titled album from the band
- Massacra, a French death/thrash metal band
- Massacre Records, a record label

=== Albums ===
- The Massacre (The Exploited album)
- The Massacre, rapper 50 Cent's second commercial album

=== Songs ===
- "Massacre", a song by Escape the Fate
- "Massacre", a song by Thin Lizzy
- "Massacre", a song by Kim Petras from Turn Off the Light
- "Massacre", a song by Bathory from Under the Sign of the Black Mark

=== Other uses in arts, entertainment, and media ===
- "Massacre", Code Lyoko: Evolution episode 25
- "Massacre" (Star Wars: The Clone Wars)
- The Massacre (Doctor Who)
- The Massacre, a 1792 play by Elizabeth Inchbald (unperformed)

== Places ==
- Massacre, Dominica, a land on the island of Dominica in the Caribbean

== Politics and news ==
- Saturday Night Massacre, firing of US government officials following the Watergate scandal
- Friday Night Massacre, term used for the 2020 United States Postal Service crisis, related to Postal voting in the 2020 United States elections
- Thursday Night Massacre (Twitter), term used to describe the December 2022 Twitter suspensions

== See also ==
- Democide
- Ethnic cleansing
- Genocide
- Mass killing
- Mass murder
- Politicide
