= Masaka Hospital =

Masaka Hospital, may refer to one of the following

- Masaka Regional Referral Hospital, a 750-bed regional referral and teaching hospital in Uganda
- Masaka Hospital, Rwanda, a district hospital in Kacuciro District, Kigali, Rwanda
