= Guarayos =

Eastern Bolivian indigenous group

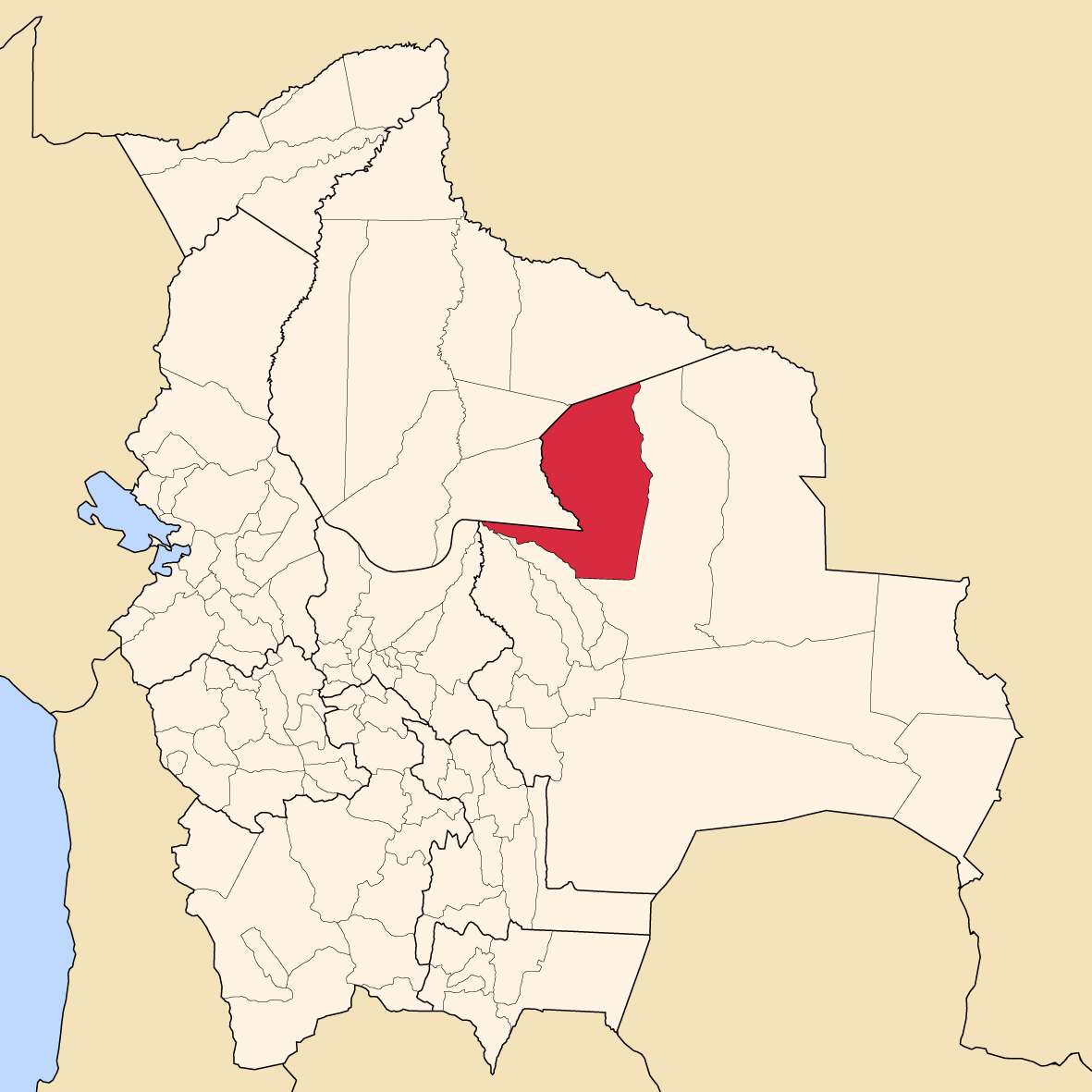
The Guarayos Providence in Santa Cruz, Bolivia

The Guarayos are an indigenous group living in their ancestral land in eastern Bolivia. They are located north of the department of Santa Cruz. The current population of the Guarayo group in Bolivia is 12,000. They primarily speak Guarayu, and 70% of the population is Roman Catholic with the remaining 30% practicing ethnic religions. The Guarayu speak the Guarayu language, a language of the Tupían language family. They are known to be predominantly agricultural as much of their culture and lifestyle relies on their land.

== History ==
Most likely Guarayos migrated to Bolivia from Paraguay centuries before when the Guaraní attacked the frontiers of the Inca Empire. Guarayos ancestors are believed to be the Guaraní.

== Culture ==
=== Traditional religious beliefs ===
The Guarayos believe that three persons formed the world: Alaangui, Mbirachucha, and Candir. They also hold Zaguaguayu with respect as their first ancestor. The traditional religious beliefs include attributing marks on the moon to misbehavior of Abeulo, their Great Father.

=== Clothing ===
As missionaries came into their villages, Guarayos were in feather ornaments and paint without any other clothing. Today, the Guarayo women wear dresses out of long cloth and men wear long bark-cloth tunics.

== Lifestyle ==
=== Daily life ===
The Guarayos reside in the Bolivian lowlands and are predominantly hunter-gatherers and small farmers that grow corn, bananas and rice. Guarayos communities began forming sindicatos to occupy and allocate land in the 1970s. These sindicatos, known locally as agrarian zones were headed by presidents selected by traditional village leaders. Of the Guarayo population, 90.6% were below the poverty line, compared to 58.6% for Bolivia, and 38% for the Department of Santa Cruz.

=== Marriage and child birth ===
It was difficult for the Guarayo people to abandon polygyny as they resisted accepting marriage traditions of the church. Young women require the consent of both their father and brother, where marriages between a man and his sister's daughter is preferred. Following the birth of a child, couvade is practiced. Fathers remain in their hammocks for the first three days after their child's birth in order for the child's soul to follow its father and not be injured.

=== Death ===
When a Guarayo dies, their soul travels to the land of Tamoi, the Great Ancestor. On this journey, their soul passes through various temptations with great danger. At the end of the journey, Tamoi washes the soul as it will now become young and attractive again.

== Politics ==
=== Central Organization of Native Guarayos Peoples ===
Following the destruction of an interdepartmental highway opening the region to outsides, the Guarayo people created second level organization, Central Organization of Native Guarayo Peoples (COPNAG). Leaders were elected a general assembly consisting of representatives across the province. COPNAG is responsible for representing Guarayo interests, allocating resources through submitting forest management plans entitled TCO lands, and certifying the authenticity of pre-existing land claims.

COPNAG struggled with accusations and fraud because of the power the leaders of the organization have over land claims. The organization soon split and a parallel group, the ‘authentic’ COPNAG assumed power and were soon recognized by the Santa Cruz departmental government and the Comité Cívico of Santa Cruz. Daniel Yaquirera, the new President of COPNAG, has been fighting the pressures on their land with minimal support from the state government for their land rights.

=== 1996 Forest Law ===
The 1996 Forest Law finally recognized the Guaryos as legitimate forest users occupying shared land. During a period of broad reforms, this law was negotiated for the status and use of Bolivias forest land. The law allowed them to consolidate their control of the land and create 76 forest management plans. The government has not fully supported and defended these forest properties which has created insufficient security. In recent years, soybean producers have moved to the southern parts of the farmlands, occupied by the Guarayos, as the region has higher economic stakes. This has led to greater administrative problems as organizations and the government often neglect the Guarayos property rights.

=== BO Road Sector Capacity Development Project ===
The BO Road Sector Capacity Development Project includes an Indigenous Peoples Plan financed by The World Bank credit and loan that was approved in September 2015. Through promoting intercultural dialogue, mechanisms of respect, and education for road usage and garbage management, the project aims to support the Guaryo and Siriona people. Since the Guarayo group is in the project area, the Indigenous Peoples Plan was created in order for the indigenous group to benefit from the project.

=== Evo Morales ===
When Evo Morales won the presidential election in 2006 making him the first indigenous president of Bolivia, he promised hope to indigenous groups, including the Guarayos, by standing firmly with them and the environment. However, during 2000–2017, deforestation in the Guarayos Indigenous Territory was enhanced by agricultural commodity production. Evo Morales' presidency weakened the Guarayos governance as extractivism and export-oriented agriculture was prioritized over group autonomy.
