= Pimenteiras do Oeste =

Municipality in Rondônia, Brazil

- Municipality
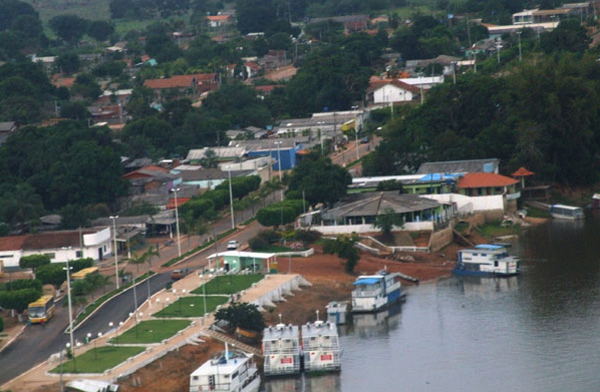

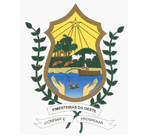
- Flag Coat of arms

- Location in Rondônia state

- Location in Brazil
- Coordinates: 13°28′57″S 61°2′48″W
- Country: Brazil
- Region: North
- State: Rondônia

Area
  - Total: 6,015 km^{2} (2,322 sq mi)
- Elevation: 185 m (607 ft)

Population (2020)
  - Total: 2,148
  - Density: 0.3571/km^{2} (0.9249/sq mi)
- Time zone: UTC−4 (AMT)

Pimenteiras do Oeste is a municipality located in the Brazilian state of Rondônia. Its population was 2,148 (2020) and its area is 6,015 km^{2}.

The municipality contains 52% of the 384,055-hectare (949,020-acre) Corumbiara State Park, created in 1990.

== See also ==
- List of municipalities in Rondônia
