= Kwaza language =

Endangered language spoken in Brazil

Kwaza
- Koaiá, Quasa
- Tsẽtsitswa
- Pronunciation: [kwaʔða]
- Native to: Brazil
- Region: Rondônia
- Ethnicity: Kwaza people
- Native speakers: 25 (2014)
- Language family: unclassified generally considered isolate

Language codes
- ISO 639-3: xwa
- Glottolog: kwaz1243
- ELP: Kwaza
- Kwazá is classified as Critically Endangered by the UNESCO Atlas of the World's Languages in Danger

Kwaza (also written as Kwazá or Koaiá, Kwaza: Tsẽtsitswa) is an endangered Amazonian language spoken by 25 of the Kwaza people of Brazil. Kwaza is an unclassified language. It has grammatical similarities with neighboring Aikanã and Kanoê, but it is not yet clear whether this is due to a genealogical relationship or to contact.

== Classification ==
Van der Voort (2005) observes similarities among Kwaza, Kanoê, and Aikanã, but believes the evidence is not strong enough to definitively link the three languages together as part of a single language family. Hence, Kwaza is best considered to be a language isolate.

An automated computational analysis (ASJP 4) by Müller et al. (2013) also found lexical similarities between Kwaza and Aikanã. However, since the analysis was automatically generated, the grouping could be either due to mutual lexical borrowing or genetic inheritance.

Kwaza is referred to as an isolate, however, it is truer to refer to it as an unclassified language. Research has not been able to prove Kwaza's connection to any other language, but there have been attempts to identify possible linguistic relationships with unclassified neighboring languages. Kanoê and Aikanã, neighboring languages of Kwaza, appear to have classifiers, a trait they share with Kwaza.

Kwaza shares the inclusive vs exclusive distinction in subject reference with Tupi languages. The most striking evidence of possible relationships of Kwaza with other languages in the area is lexical. The long history of contact between the peoples of Rondônia has caused cultural and linguistic similarities. Van der Voort, in a paper submitted to the Leiden Research School, demonstrated similarities between Kwaza, Kanoê, and Aikanã with the Tupari languages, being Akuntsu, Koaratira and Mekens.

== Status ==
The Kwaza language is threatened by extinction. In 2004, the language was spoken on a day-to-day basis by only 54 people living in the south of the state of Rondônia, Brazil. Of those 54, more than half were children, and half were trilingual, speaking Kwaza, Aikanã, and Portuguese, and some were bilingual, also speaking Portuguese. They live south of the original home of the Kwaza, on the Tubarão-Latundê indigenous reserve.

== Language contact ==
Jolkesky (2016) notes that there are lexical similarities with the Taruma, Arawak, Jeoromitxi, Arawa, Jivaro, Mura-Matanawi, Nambikwara, Peba-Yagua, Aikanã, and Kanoe language families due to contact.

== Documentation ==
Before 1995, data on Kwaza was not properly gathered and analyzed. Knowledge on its grammar did not exist in written form. Outside of its native speakers, lexical knowledge from early scientists and explorers of the Rondônia territory did not exist. The first documentation of the Kwaza people was made in 1913 by Cândido Rondon because of his expeditions with telegraph lines in areas of Rondônia. In the 1930s, the first written sources of Kwaza words were taken by Claude Levi-Strauss, an anthropologist. Levi-Strauss was on a reconnaissance expedition documented words on standardised enquiry forms developed for this purpose.

The standardised forms used allowed for easy lexical comparisons between different languages explorers encountered. Levi-Strauss's 1938 glossary is the oldest source of data from Kwaza and is available in van der Voort's book. The glossary contained fifty-one French words with their equivalent in Kwaza. In 1942, Lieutenant Estanislau Zack created a 222-comparative word list of four languages, including Kwaza. Kwaza was subsequently forgotten until Harvey Carlson described the language in 1984. The third recorded documentation of Kwaza was taken as an unpublished word-list by Carlson. During linguistic fieldwork as an M.A. student from Berkeley, he took down fifty Kwaza words, which is available in van der Voort (2004). The present description of Kwaza is the result of Carlson's word list, as he brought the language to the attention of the linguistic world.

Linguist Hein van der Voort's involvement in the Netherlands Organization for Scientific Research (NOW) in 1994 led to the writing of the first modern grammar of Kwaza. In his book "A Grammar of Kwaza", Van der Voort presented the first descriptive grammar of the language. The descriptive grammar included phoneme inventory describing the oral vowels, nasal vowels, and place of articulation. Van der Voort provides a complex description of the vowels, with descriptions on minimal pairs, contextual pairs and variation. Consonants were also recorded with their matching IPA transcriptions, places of articulation, and classification. He provides an interpretation of glides, descriptive rules of syllable structure, stress, length, and intonation. Kwaza loan phonology is described with examples. A comprehensive section on parts of speech of Kwaza is available with information on noun phrases, verb phrases, types of morphemes, and word order. Van der Voort includes texts of tales translated from Kwaza to English to bring attention to Brazilian indigenous culture in an effort to preserve it. These texts include traditional tales, historical personal accounts, modern personal accounts, and translated songs. The last section of van der Voort's book is a dictionary of Kwaza to English. Hein van der Voort's work on the language has given the Kwaza the ability to preserve the language through making it available for others to learn, including non-indigenous people.

== Phonology ==
Kwaza has eight oral and seven nasal vowel phonemes.

=== Vowels ===
Vowel phonemes of Kwaza (in adapted IPA)
	Oral vowels			Nasal vowels		
	Front	Central	Back	Front	Central	Back
Close	i		u	ĩ		ũ
Close-mid	e	ɘ		ẽ	ɘ̃	
Open-mid	ɛ	œ	ɔ	ɛ̃		ɔ̃
Open		a			ã	

- /a/ can sometimes be heard as [ɑ] when before back vowels /u, ɔ/.
- /ɛ/ can also be heard as [æ] in free variation.
- /ɘ/ can be heard as [ɨ̞] in free variation, as [ə] in unstressed position, or as a glide [ɨ̯] in syllable-final position. /ɘ̃/ can be heard as [ɨ̞̃] in free variation.
- /œ/ can be heard as [œ̈] in free variation.
- /œ/ is rare but is attested in minimal pairs.

=== Consonants ===
The consonant inventory consists of 19 phonemes.

Consonant phonemes of Kwaza
		Labial	Lamino- alveolar	Apico- alveolar	Palatal	Velar	Glottal
Plosive	Voiceless	p	t	t̠̺		k	ʔ
Plosive	Implosive	ɓ		ɗ			
Affricate			ts		tɕ		
Fricative			s	s̠̺			h
Nasal		m		n	ɲ		
Tap				ɾ			
Approximant		w		l	j		

- Implosives /ɓ, ɗ/ can also be heard as voiced plosives [b, d] in free variation.
- /h/ can be heard as voiced [ɦ] in intervocalic positions.
- /w, ɾ, j/ are nasalized as [w̃, ɾ̃, j̃] within nasal vowels.
- Sounds /s̠̺, w/ are heard as [ɕ, w̜] before front vowels.

=== Syllable structure ===
All syllables in Kwaza are vowel-final and generally adhere to the (C)V syllable structure. The exceptions occur in glides and glottal stops. Any syllables that could begin with a vowel instead are preceded by a glottal stop.

== Orthography ==
a, ã, b, ç, d, e, ẽ, ɛ, h, i, ĩ, ɨ, ɨ̃ , j, k, l, m, n, o, õ, œ, p, r, s, t, ts, tʃ, u, ũ, w, ʔ

== Morphology ==
=== Pronouns ===
Personal pronouns
Person	Associate	Pronoun
1	-	si
2	-	xyi
1	2	txa'na
1	3	tsi'tsɛ
2	3	xyi'tsɛ
3	-	ĩ

Examples:

'si-da-ki
I-1S-DEC
'it's me'

'xyi-xa-ki
you-2-DEC
'it's you'

txa'na 'ɛ-a-ki
we.IN go-1P-DEC
'we go' (including addressee)

tsi'tsɛ 'ɛa-xa-ki
we.EX. go-1P-AS-DEC
'we go' (excluding addressee)

zjwãu 'mɛ̃-hata-Ø-ki xyitsɛ-'wã
João beat-3S.2O-3-DEC you.PL-AO
'It was João who beat you'

'ĩ-ki
he-DEC
'it is he himself'

'ĩ-tsy-nãi
he-GER-NOM
'(the words) of himself, his own (words)'

=== Parts of speech ===
Kwaza has four parts of speech: particles, verbs, adverbs, and nouns. No adjectives occur in the language. In Kwaza, the majority of the bound grammatical morphemes are suffixes. Kwaza is morphologically complex in its verbs. Word order is relatively free, but SOV and SVO are more dominant. In the language, it is mandatory to inflect verbs to express mood and subject person. First and second person singular are distinguished by subject agreement marking, as are first person inclusive and exclusive, and the second persona plural. The third person is not pronounced. There is no difference between third person singular and plural, or between feminine and masculine.

==== Pro-drop ====
Hein van der Voort (2000) categorizes Kwaza as a 'pro-drop' language because subject agreement is obligatory, while pronominal reference is optional. Definite argument morphemes can agree with explicit lexical arguments, but overt pronouns have a contrastive effect by emphasizing them.

==== Verbs ====
Verb morphology in Kwaza can express numerous moods. These moods include exhortative, interrogative, declarative, imperative, and negative. The imperative only happens with second person subjects. The second person singular usually has no expression. There are several verbal-final elements in Kwaza, which exist as subordinate clause mood markers. In adverbial clause construction, subordinate clause mood markers are used, for example in concessive and conditional clauses. The same object and subject morphemes are used, while the third person is not expressed. There is also a semantically abstract 'mood' marker used to connect clauses that are both coordinated and subordinated.

===== Verb derivation =====
Verbal derivation in Kwaza includes valency and valency change, negation, modality, aspect, and tense which are marked with various optional verbal morphemes. Some modality morphemes, according to van der Voort, could be grammatically related to mood markers. Verbs can be turned into adverbs or nouns through stem-final nominalizing morphemes. Kwaza has two subdivisions of derivational morphemes, directional and classifiers. While verb morphology in Kwaza is complex, nominal morphology is not. Kwaza has no gender or number inflection. Nouns can have animate object case marking. They can also have one of the oblique case markers: beneficiary, locative, comitative, and instrumental. Nouns are turned into verbs through attaching mood marking. As mentioned, Kwaza does not have adjectives.

==== Nouns and classifiers ====
Attributive modification of nouns occurs by comparing them with other nouns. Kwaza also has many classifying morphemes that only 'agree' with specific nouns. Classifiers are used widely. They can be used in verb stems, attach to bare nouns, and also modify adverbs. Classifiers are used in the position of nominalizers. Classifiers in Kwaza support van der Voorts statement of the language being pro-drop as they have functions similar to the functions of verbal agreement morphemes. These properties of classifiers rely heavily on the environment in which they are used, and according to van der Voort are not as dynamic as the properties of cross-reference morphemes. In complex nominalized clauses, specific classifiers cannot replace the nominalizer.

=== Morphological aspect -ry- ===
In the Kwaza language, the morpheme -ry- is used to describe a grammatical number for words in contexts where a few of their referents are described or referred to, also known as paucal. In both nouns and verbs of Kwaza, the morpheme -ry- is associated with paucal number, but does not occur in word-final position, and is always followed by a nominaliser (formation of a noun from a verb or adjective).

For example:

'hai?arakaru ỹnỹ-'ry-hỹ
Hai?arakaru call-PAU-NOM
'the people of / called Hai?arakaru'

etohoi-ry-'rai
child-PAU-damn
'those (my, your, his) children'

The paucal morpheme -ry- applies only to humans and animals in Kwaza. For example:

xo'ro 'ki-ỹ-ry-hỹ
ant red-ATT-PAU-NOM
'that (type of) red ant (PL, *SG)'

tala-'mɛ-ry-rai
uncle-ASS-PAU-damn
'(my) uncles'

=== Negation ===
In Kwaza, the morpheme -he- is one of the negation morphemes, which creates the negative in predicates and propositions when bound together. In this negation morpheme, the negative usually comes before the person and mood marking. For example:

awỹi-'he-da-ki ti-hỹ-'re
see-NEG-1S-DEC what-NOM-INT
'I haven't seen him, where is he?'

areta-'he-da-ki
know-NEG-1S-DEC
'I don't know'

awỹi-he-ta-ki
see-NEG-1O-DEC
'He didn't see me'

However, if the clause in the sentence is declarative, and there is no clear argument cross-reference, the declarative mood marker is -tse.

kẽi?ỹ-'he-tse
smooth-NEG-DEC
'It isn't smooth'

ja-'he-tse
eat-NEG-DEC
'He did not eat'

=== Reduplication ===
Reduplication in the language is very common, and occurs in many contexts, some of which include lexical roots, constituent syllables of roots, verbal person inflections and other parts of morphemes. In Kwaza, reduplication can also represent a past tense construction, if the person cross-reference morpheme is reduplicated. This is particularly interesting since in the Kwaza language, there is zero specific marking of past and present.

kukui'hỹ-da-da-ky-hỹ-ki
ill-1S-1S-PAST-NOM-DEC
'I was ill'

'masju kukui'hỹ-da-da-ky-hỹ-ki=da'mỹ-tse
Marcio ill-1S-1S-PAST-NOM-DEC=want-DEC
'Marcio is going to say he was ill'

Whereas something involving pain in the present tense would take this form:

Kukui-sitoko'rõ-da-ki
hurt-CL:elbow-1S-DEC
'I have pain in my elbow'

In these examples, we see the reduplication of the first person singular, which in the language presents a first person past tense state. Another form of reduplication is root reduplication, which occurs with the repetition of the entire root which can occur with repetitive, progressive, durative and intensifying meaning which is attested both with verbal and adverbial roots. For example:

Hãidi=hãi'di-tse
drip=drip-DEC
'It is dripping'

haka=ha'ka-hỹ-tɛ
old=old-NOM-NOM
'Very old thing'

hy=hy-'dwa-ki
go=go-DR:onto-DEC
'He is walking (on) the path'

There is also another way in the Kwaza language where reduplication occurs to intensify meaning. Repetition of a syllable of the lexical root may also occur with repetitive and intensifying meaning, oftentimes it is the first syllable which is reduplicated:

do-do'te-ki
RED-shed-DEC
'It is leaking'

ca-ca'ri-ki dutu're
RED-shoot-DEC pig
'He killed many pigs'

tsitsɛ-'wã e-e'sa-eteja-ki
we.EX-AO RED-sting-1PO-DEC
'many wasps stung us' (t)

=== Periodic tense ===
Kwaza has two periodic tense markers, nocturnal sile- and matutinal kore-.

=== Case and agreement ===
According to Van der Voort (2004), in Kwaza, there is no required morphological distinction in how pronouns and nouns function as objects and subjects. However, in certain cases, case inflection of nouns occurs. There is one case van der Voort describes a syntactic government relation between verb and argument. The suffix -wã conveys this case, which is called the "animate object" case. Kwaza displays a small number of "oblique" or "local" case markers which display semantic relations amongst verbs and possible nominal satellites. The suffix -ko expresses "instrumental" case, -na expresses "locative", -dynỹ expresses "comitative" and -du expresses "beneficiary".

==== Animate object ====
In some transitive verbs, specific animate non-subjects of verbs are marked by -wã. -wã is applied under situations not completely understood. What is known is -wã often places stress on the animate non-subjects. -wã is necessary for most verbs with animate nouns that have a direct object function:

jere'xwa 'kay-ki natau-'wã
jaguar scratch-DEC Natal-AO
'the jaguar scratched Natal'

'ay-hỹ 'kay-ki
that-NOM scratch-DEC
'that one scratched (him)'

Other than elucidating which animate argument is the object, -wã also disambiguates the subject from the object. It is especially useful when they are both third person arguments:

wã zjwãu-'wã e'xyi-ki
bee João-AO sting-DEC
'a wasp stung João'

hiri'ni zjwãu-'wã isi'xwe-ki
shaman João-AO medicate-DEC
'the shaman is treating João'

-wã is not always necessary to differentiate between object and subject, because verbal cross-reference obligatorily expresses the subject. For first and second person, subject cross-reference is not zero, but it is in third person. Even though cross-reference agreement is enough to distinguish subjects and objects, -wã is still obligatory in some cases:

zjwãu-'wã tsa'si-da-ki
João-AO follow-1S-DEC
'I went after João'

wã si-'wã e'xyi-ta-ki
bee I-AO sting-1O-DEC
'(a) wasp stung me'

Without -wã, syntactic ambiguity occurs. But in cases with differences in animacy, no semantic-pragmatic ambiguity occurs. This can be seen in the following third person examples of an animate subject and inanimate object:

uru'hu xare'ja-ki au ho-'tε
vulture search-DEC flesh rotten-NOM
'the vulture is looking for rotten meat'

Zjwãu ywynwỹ-ko'ro to'wε-ki
João tree-CL:arm break-DEC
'João broke a branch off the tree'

==== Transitivised verbs ====
When verbs with the transitivising morpheme -ta- occur with animate objects, they must be marked with -wã:

zjuze-'wã oja-'ta-da-ki
José-AO go-TRA-1S-DEC
'I visited José'

When the causative -dy is attached to intransitive verbs, they are transitivised. In these cases only animate objects are marked:

luzeu-'wã xarere-'dy-da-ki
Luzeu-AO crazy-CAU-1S-DEC
'I'm making Luzeu mad'

kudεrε-'wã mãmãñẽ-'dy-da-ki
Canderé-AO sing-CAU-1S-DEC
'I made Canderé sing'

==== Ditransitive verbs ====
The indirect object is usually marked in common ditransitive verbs while the animate object is unmarked:

zjwãu-'wã ãwã'txi-da-ki
João-AO show-1S-DEC
'I'm showing it to João'

zjwãu ãwã'txi-da-ki
João show-1S-DEC
'I'm showing João to him'

==== Verbs with classifiers ====
If transitive verbs with animate objects have classifying morphemes, -wã is also attached. This occurs if the classifier added to the verb stem and when it is not:

luzeu-'wã hãrũ'ro-da-ki
Luzeu-AO strangle-1S-DEC
'I strangled Luzeu'

zjwãu-'wã hado-'ri-da-ki
João-AO pierce-CL:flat-1S-DEC
'I pierced João through the chest'

In Kwaza, objects of transitive verbs are usually case marked because they are of the animate category. Case marking becomes ungrammatical when they are inanimate. Case marking is not required to differentiate the object from the subject. The subject can be identified through cross-reference marking on the verb. This changes if all arguments are in third person, when arguments are in third person there can be ambiguity. Without case marking, on the basis of syntax alone, there is no way to distinguish third person animate subjects and objects. Case marking is obligatory with transitive verbs have arguments that are the same in person and animacy. -wã- has two functions: it marks objecthood and animacy.

==== Locative ====
In Kwaza, the case ending -na expresses the sense of "in". -na can be used as a general marked to express several locational senses such as: "under, from, into", etc. -na is often seen with verbs that have a directional suffix:

a'xy-na
house-LOC
'in the house'

ʃupi'ngwaja-na ojabu'ru-da-ki ilato
Chupinguaia-LOC arrive.there-1S-DEC yesterday
'I arrived there in Chupinguaia yesterday'

==== Instrumental ====
-ko is used to mark nouns that function as an instrumental argument verbs:

prego-ko 'twe-ki lo'te
spike-INS pierce-DEC door
'the spike went through the door'

co'ha-ko 'dai?oce-'ra
foot-INS clear-IMP
'kick it aside with your foot!'

==== Beneficiary ====
-du marks beneficiary arguments:

maga'riDa-du 'wε-da-mỹ
Margarida-BER bring-1S-VOL
'I'm going to take (it) for Margarida'

==== Comitative ====
-dynỹ marks comitative arguments. The matrix verb may be intransitive or transitive.

jere'xwa-dynỹ hyhy'rwa-da-ki
jaguar-COMIT move-1S-DEC
'I'm walking with the dog (on my side)'

== Syntax ==
=== Word order ===
Since the language is so morphologically complex, it is often described as a non-configurational language. The flexibility in word order is possible due to almost every word in the sentence having case inflection. However, generally the structures are head-final, with SVO (Subject-Verb-Object) being most common in instances of two over arguments. Otherwise, both SV and OV occur frequently.
