= Paraguá River =

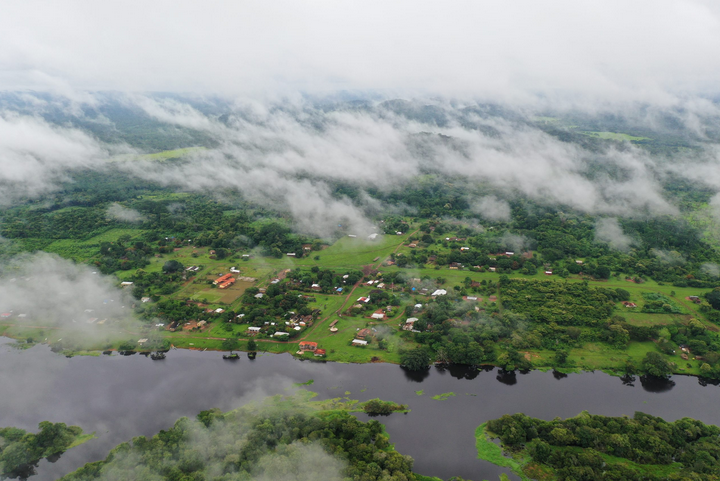

Location
- Country: Bolivia

Physical characteristics
- Mouth: Guaporé River
  - coordinates: 13°31′52″S 61°50′15″W
- Length: 420 km (260 mi)

The Paraguá River is a river of Bolivia.

== See also ==
- List of rivers of Bolivia
