= Aikanã language =

Endangered indigenous language of Brazil

Aikanã
- Tubarão, Huari
- Aikanã
- Native to: Brazil
- Region: Rondônia
- Ethnicity: Aikanã people
- Native speakers: 250 (2023)
- Language family: Language isolate
- Writing system: Latin

Language codes
- ISO 639-3: tba
- Glottolog: aika1237
- ELP: Aikanã
- Linguasphere: 82-AKA-a
- 88-GAD-ab

Aikanã (sometimes called Tubarão, Corumbiara/Kolumbiara, or Huari/Uari/Wari) is an endangered language isolate spoken by about 250 Aikanã people in Rondônia, Brazil. It has SOV word order. Aikanã uses the Latin script. The people live with speakers of Koaia (Kwaza).

== Demographics ==
Aikanã is traditionally spoken in the Terra Indígena Tubarão-Latundê, where it is still the dominant language. About 250 people speak the language. It is also spoken in the Terra Indígena Kwazá do Rio São Pedro, where Kwazá is traditionally spoken. The language is currently being learned by children and used sometimes in school. A few Aikanã families in also reside in the Terra Indígena Rio Guaporé, but they do not speak the language there. There are nearly 100 ethnic Aikanã (locally known as Kassupá) people, in the Comunidade Indígena Cassupá e Salamãi, although the final Aikanã speaker there died in 2018.

== Name ==
The name Huari originates from the Guarasu language, meaning 'Indian', and is not recognized by the Aikanã. The names Massaká and Kassupá are the names of important family heads originating from different Aikanã settlements. Tubarão is a corruption of the name Gubal’um, a Salamãi (Mondé) man who became an influential figure in the Aikanã after he married into them. Aikanã is also known by the name of the Corumbiara River.

== Classification ==
Hein van der Voort (2005) observes similarities among Aikanã, Kanoê, and Kwaza, but believes that it is not strong enough to definitively link the three languages together as part of a single language family.

Jolkesky (2016) also observes lexical similarities with Kanoe, Kwaza, and Nambikwara, which he claims is due to contact.

== Phonology ==
=== Vowels ===
Vowels
| | Front | | Central | | Back | |
| | Oral | Nasal | Oral | Nasal | Oral | Nasal |
|---|---|---|---|---|---|---|
| Close | i | ĩ | | | u | ũ |
| Close-mid | ʏ | ʏ̃ | | | (ɔ) | (ɔ̃) |
| Open-mid | ɛ | ɛ̃ | | | | |
| Open | | | a | ã | | |

- /y, ỹ/ can also be heard as close-mid [ø, ø̃].
- /a, ã/ are heard as [ɨ, ɨ̃] before /i, ĩ/.

=== Consonants ===
Consonants
| | | Labial | Dental | Alveolar | Palatal | Velar | Glottal |
|---|---|---|---|---|---|---|---|
| Stop/ Affricate | voiceless | p | t̪͡s | t | t͡ʃ | k | ʔ |
| Stop/ Affricate | voiced | b | d̪͡ð | d | d͡ʒ | | |
| Fricative | | | d̪͡ð | | | | |
| Sonorant | | w | | ɾ | | | h |

- Within the position of nasal vowels, sounds /b, d, d͡ð/ become [m, n, ⁿ̪ð] and /w, ɾ, h/ become [w̃, ɾ̃, h̃].
- /t̪͡s, d͡ð/ are only heard as affricates [t̪͡s, d͡ð] in word-initial position. Elsewhere, they are heard as a fricatives [s] and [ð].
- /w/ can be heard as a fricative [β] when before /i/.
- /ɾ/ can also be heard as [l] between vowels.
- /d͡ʒ/ is heard as [d͡ʒ] before a front-vowel, [j] before a non-front vowel, and as [ɲ] or [j̃] before a nasal vowel.

== Morphology ==
=== Verb ===
In Aikanã, the verb phrase or predicate morphological template is:

| verb | subject | classifier directional | aspect modality | valency | object | tense | object | subject | negation | mood |

== Syntax ==
=== Word order ===
The constituent word order of Aikanã varies. Pragmatically unmarked word order for constituents of core clauses is subject–object–verb.

baba erue-ye su-ka-ekawa-re-ẽ
father pig-ACC stab-1SG-CLF:neck-FUT-DECL
'Father is going to slaughter the pig (i.e., stab it in the neck).'

An object with the accusative case -ye may be placed after the verb:

xua-ka-kü-wãyã-re-ka-ẽ yaya-ye
see-1SG-DIR:close-2PL.BEN-FUT-1SG-DECL older.sibling-ACC
'I will go look for Sister for you.'
