= Aikanã people =

Aikanã

Total population
- 350 (2014)

Regions with significant populations
- Brazil (Rondônia)

Languages
- Aikanã

Religion
- Animism

The Aikanã are an Indigenous people of Brazil, living in the state of Rondônia, in the western Amazonian lowlands. They are also known as the Massacá, Tubarão, Columbiara, Mundé, Mondé, Huari and Aikaná.

== Land ==
The Aikanã's traditional lands are in the region of the Guaporé River. In 1970, the Brazilian government moved the tribe onto the Tubarão-Latundê Indigenous Territory, with poor soil. They have three villages and live in nearby cities, such as Vilhena.

== Language ==
Aikanã people speak the Aikanã language, which is an unclassified language. Its ISO 639-3 language code is "tba".
