= Yuqui language =

Tupi-Guarani language of Bolivia

Yuqui
- Yuki
- Native to: Bolivia
- Region: Cochabamba
- Ethnicity: Yuqui
- Native speakers: 120 (2004)
- Language family: Tupian: Tupí–Guaraní; Guarayu; Yuqui
- Writing system: Latin

Official status
- Official language in: Bolivia

Language codes
- ISO 639-3: yuq
- Glottolog: yuqu1240
- ELP: Yuki
- Linguasphere: 88-AAI-ba

Yuqui (Yuki) is a severely endangered Guarayú language of the Tupí-Guaraní language family spoken in the department of Cochabamba, Bolivia by the Yuqui.

== Phonology ==
=== Consonants ===
		Bilabial	Alveolar	Palatal	Velar			Glottal
		Bilabial	Alveolar	Palatal	plain	lab.	pal.	Glottal
Plosive	voiceless	p	t		k	kʷ ⟨kw⟩	kʲ ⟨ky⟩	ʔ
Plosive	voiced	b	d		g	gʷ ⟨gw⟩		
Fricative	voiceless		s					
Fricative	voiced			j ⟨y⟩	x	xʷ ⟨xw⟩	xʲ ⟨xy⟩	
Affricate				t͡ʃ ⟨č⟩				
Vibrant			r					
Nasal		m	n	ɲ				

== Orthography ==
It is written in the Latin script. The Bible was partially translated into Yuqui in 2000.

Yuqui alphabet
A a	Ã ã	B b	C c	CH ch	D d	E e	Ẽ ẽ	G g	I i
Ĩ ĩ	J j	M m	N n	O o	Õ õ	P p	Q q	R r	S s
T t	U u	Ũ ũ	Y y
