= Guarayu language =

Tupian language of Bolivia

Guarayu
- Gwarayú, nyanyanye, ñañañe, guarani'ete'
- Native to: Bolivia, Paraguay
- Region: Santa Cruz, Boquerón
- Ethnicity: 12,000 (2012)
- Native speakers: 8,400 (2012)
- Language family: Tupian: Tupí–Guaraní; Guarayu–Sirionó; Guarayu

Official status
- Official language in: Bolivia

Language codes
- ISO 639-3: gyr
- Glottolog: guar1292
- ELP: Guarayu
- Linguasphere: 88-AAI-cb

Guarayu (Guarayu: Gwarayú, nyanyanye, ñañañe, guarani'ete) is a Tupian language of Bolivia that is spoken by the Guarayo people who numbered 23,910 in 2012.

There were some 30 speakers of Guarayu in Paraguay as of 2012.

== Phonology ==
Vowels
	Front	Central	Back
Close	i, ĩ	ɨ, ɨ̃	u, ũ
Mid	e, ẽ		o, õ
Open		a, ã	

Consonants
		Bilabial	Alveolar	Palatal	Velar		Glottal
		Bilabial	Alveolar	Palatal	plain	lab.	Glottal
Nasal	central	m	n	ɲ			
Nasal	post-ploded	mᵇ	nᵈ				
Stop	voiceless	p	t		k	kʷ	ʔ
Stop	pre-ploded					ᶢw	
Stop	prenasal vl.	(ᵐp)	(ⁿt)		(ᵑk)		
Stop	prenasal vd.				ᵑɡ	ᵑᶢw	
Affricate			t͡s	t͡ʃ			
Fricative		β	s				
Tap			ɾ				
Glide				j		w	

- [ᵐp, ⁿt, ᵑk] are heard as allophones of /p, t, k/ when in nasal vowel position.
