= Sirionó language =

Tupí–Guaraní language of eastern Bolivia

Sirionó
- Mbia cheë
- Native to: Bolivia
- Region: Beni Department, Santa Cruz Department (Bolivia)
- Ethnicity: Sirionó people
- Native speakers: 300 (2012)
- Language family: Tupian: Tupí–Guaraní; Group (II); Sirionó

Official status
- Official language in: Bolivia

Language codes
- ISO 639-3: srq
- Glottolog: siri1273
- ELP: Sirionó
- Linguasphere: 88-AAI-a

Sirionó (Mbia Cheë; also written as Mbya, Siriono) is a Tupian (Tupi–Guarani, Subgroup II) language spoken by about 400 Sirionó people (50 are monolingual) and 120 Yuqui in eastern Bolivia (eastern Beni and northwestern Santa Cruz departments) in the village of Ibiato (Eviato) and along the Río Blanco in farms and ranches.

== History ==
=== Documentation ===
The first grammar of Sirionó was Gramática de la lengua sirionó, published in 1949 and written by Anselmo Schermair. This was followed in 1965 by Homer Firestone's Description and Classification of Sirionó, which failed to acknowledge the work of Schermair, only citing his vocabulary from 1958.

== Phonology ==
=== Vowels ===
Sirionó has six distinctive vowels. Three points of articulation and three levels of height are contrastive.

Vowel phonemes of Sirionó
	Front	Central	Back
Close	i	ɨ	u
Mid	e		o
Open		a	

=== Consonants ===
Consonant phonemes of Sirionó
		Bilabial	Alveolar	Alveopalatal	Velar	Glottal
Occlusive	plain		t		k	
Occlusive	pal.				kʲ	
Nasal		m	n	ɲ		
Fricative		ꞵ	s	t͡ʃ		h
Tap						
Approximant				j	w	
