= 1st Plurinational Legislative Assembly of Bolivia =

2010–2015 Term of the Plurinational Legislative Assembly Asamblea Legislativa Plurinacional

Type
- Type: Bicameral
- Houses: Senate; Chamber of Deputies

Leadership
- President of the Plurinational Legislative Assembly (ex oficio as Vice President): Álvaro García Linera, MAS-IPSP
- President of the Senate: Gabriela Montaño, MAS-IPSP
- President of the Chamber of Deputies: Betty Asunta Tejada Soruco, MAS-IPSP

Structure
- Seats: 166; 36 Senators; 130 Deputies
- Senate political groups: MAS-IPSP (26); PPB-CN (10)
- Chamber of Deputies political groups: MAS-IPSP (88); PPB-CN (37); UN (3); AS (2)

Elections
- Senate voting system: Proportional representation system by department
- Chamber of Deputies voting system: Mixed member system
- Last Senate election: 6 November 2009
- Last Chamber of Deputies election: 6 November 2009
- Next Senate election: 5 October 2014
- Next Chamber of Deputies election: 5 October 2014

Meeting place
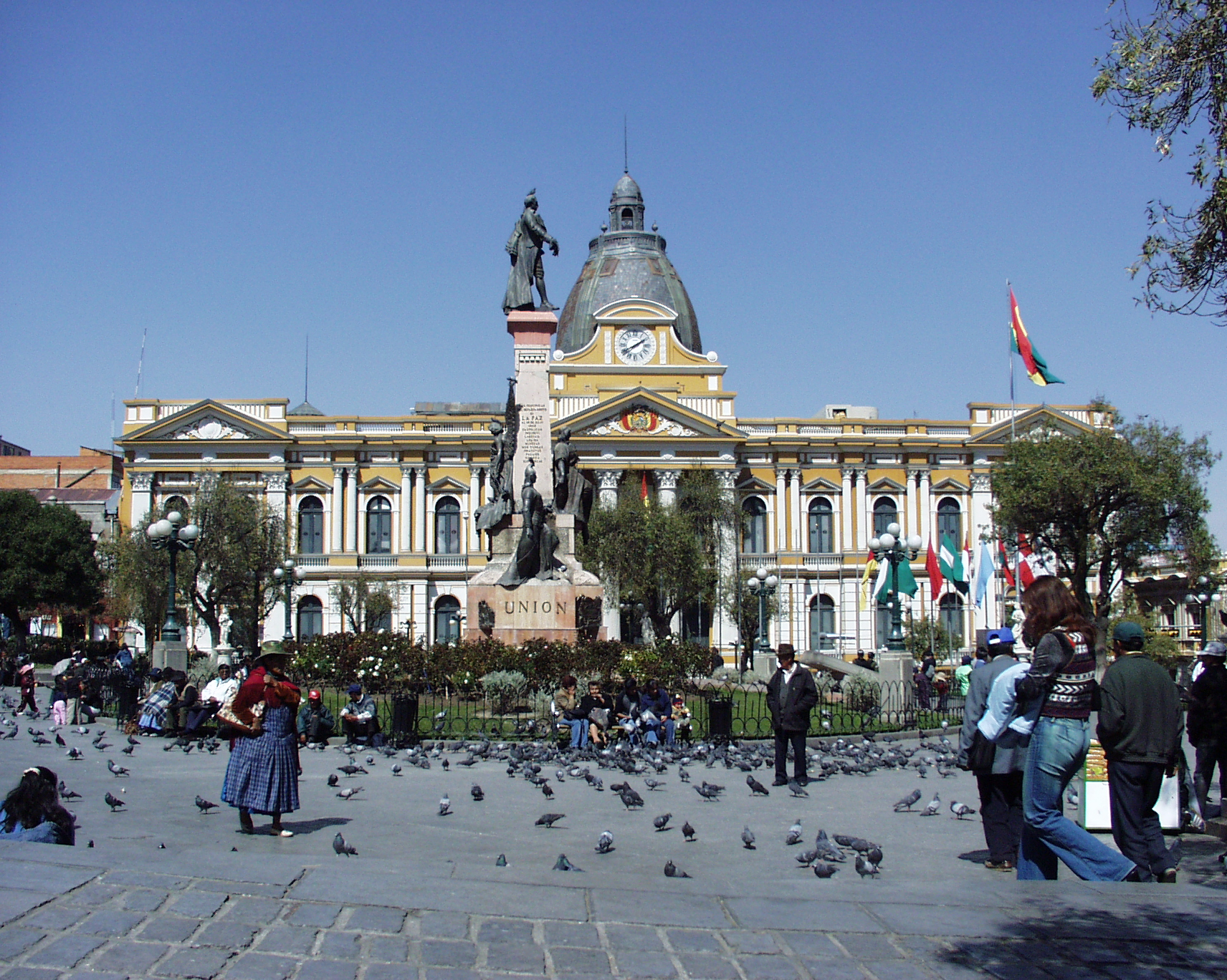

Website
- http://www.senado.bo http://www.diputados.bo

The 2010–2015 Plurinational Legislative Assembly of Bolivia was the first class of the Bolivian legislature, also known as the Plurinational Legislative Assembly, to go by that name. The Assembly was controlled in both houses by the governing Movement for Socialism (MAS-IPSP), elected with a 2/3 supermajority, although some members later separated themselves from the majority. Just four incumbent members of the 2005–2010 Congress returned: Deputy Antonio Franco; Deputy Javier Zabaleta (MAS-IPSP/MSM); Senator René Martínez (MAS-IPSP), who was a deputy; and Senator Róger Pinto, previously of Podemos and now representing PPB-CN.

The Assembly was elected as part of general elections on 9 December 2009. After the votes were counted, party strengths in Congress were as follows:

Party	Votes	Percentage	Deputies	Senators
Movement for Socialism	2.943.209	64,22	88	26
Plan Progress for Bolivia – National Convergence	1.212.795	26,46	37	10
National Unity Front	258.971	5,65	3	
Social Alliance	106.027	2,31	2	
Social Patriotic Unity Movement	23.257	0,51		
People	15.627	0,34		
Peoples for Liberty and Sovereignty	12.995	0,28		
Social Democratic Bolivia	9.905	0,22		
Source: Comisión Nacional Electoral

As part of a break between the MAS-IPSP and its ally the Without Fear Movement (MSM), the latter party's four deputies, elected on the MAS slate pledged in late March 2010, "to act in accord with our political identity, with our conscience, and with the people who elected us with their vote." Consequently, MAS-IPSP had 84 members in the Chambers of Deputies, while the MSM has four. However, two MSM deputies re-affiliated with the MAS-IPSP. In late 2011, at least five indigenous deputies distanced themselves from the MAS-IPSP and announced the formation of an Indigenous Bloc in the Assembly, independent of the MAS. While the Assembly's leadership has yet to officially recognize these two defections, the MAS now controls less than two-thirds of all Assembly seats.

== Senate ==
The latest President of the Senate, elected on 19 January 2010 and serving until her death on 26 October of that year, was Ana María Romero de Campero (MAS-IPSP, La Paz). Romero had been on medical leave since February 2010, and René Martínez (MAS-IPSP, Chuquisaca) served as interim President in her absence. Martínez was confirmed as Senate President on 1 November. Martha Poma Luque (MAS-IPSP, La Paz) was elected the same day to serve as Vice President of the Senate, the first woman de pollera to hold that office. Seventeen of 36 members of the Senate are women. The 26-member MAS-IPSP majority includes all four senators from La Paz, Oruro, and Potosí; three senators from Cochabamba and Chuquisaca; and two senators from each of Santa Cruz, Beni, Pando, and Tarija.

Romero's substitute, Javier Hurtado Mercado, served as senator in her place, but resigned 15 May 2010. Her seat was filled by Mary Constancia Medina Zabaleta, the substitute for Eugenio Rojas.

Department	Senator	Party
Chuquisaca	René Óscar Martínez Callahuanca	MAS
Chuquisaca	Nélida Sifuentes Cueto	MAS
Chuquisaca	David Sánchez Heredia	MAS
Chuquisaca	Luis Gerald Ortiz Alba	PPB
La Paz	Mary Constancia Medina Zabaleta formerly: Ana María Romero	MAS
La Paz	Eugenio Rojas Apaza	MAS
La Paz	Martha Poma Luque	MAS
La Paz	Fidel Andrés Surco Cañasaca	MAS
Cochabamba	Gonzalo Adolfo Ramón Mendoza Leigue	MAS
Cochabamba	Marcelina Chavez Salazar	MAS
Cochabamba	Julio Salazar	MAS
Cochabamba	Bernard Osvaldo Gutiérrez Sanz	PPB
Oruro	Sandra Lilian Soriano Bascopé	MAS
Oruro	Andrés Agustín Villca Daza	MAS
Oruro	Roxana Camargo Fernández	MAS
Oruro	Mario Choque Gutiérrez	MAS
Potosí	Eduardo Humberto Maldonado Iporre	MAS
Potosí	Carmen García Mamani	MAS
Potosí	Efraín Condori López	MAS
Potosí	Clementina Garnica Cruz	MAS
Tarija	Rhina Aguirre Amezaga	MAS
Tarija	Juan Enrique Jurado Ruiz	MAS
Tarija	Marcelo Eulogio Antezana Ruiz	PPB
Tarija	Maria Elena Mendez Leon	PPB
Santa Cruz	Lilly Gabriela Montaño Viaña	MAS
Santa Cruz	Isaac Ávalos Cuchallo	MAS
Santa Cruz	Germán Antelo Vaca	PPB
Santa Cruz	Centa Lothy Rek López	PPB
Beni	Freddy Bersatti Tudela	MAS
Beni	Zonia Guardia Melgar	MAS
Beni	Carlos Alberto Sonnenschein Antelo	PPB
Beni	Jeanine Áñez Chávez	PPB
Pando	Manuel Limachi Quispe	MAS
Pando	Mirtha Da Costa Ferreira	MAS
Pando	Roger Pinto Molina	PPB
Pando	Carmen Eva Gonzales Lafuente	PPB

=== Commissions ===
The Senate has ten legislative commissions (Spanish: comisión legislativa), each with two subordinate committees, whose leadership is chosen annually. Their current leadership, chosen on 2 February 2011, is as follows:

Commission	President	Party of President
Constitution, Human Rights, Legislation, and Electoral System	Eugenio Rojas Apaza	MAS
Plural Justice, Prosecutor's Office (Spanish: Ministerio Público), and Legal Defense of the State	Sandra Soriano Bascopé	MAS
States Security, Armed Forces, and Bolivian Police	Freddy Bersatti Tudela	MAS
Economic Policy, Planning, and Finance	Mario Choque Gutiérrez	MAS
Social Policy, Education, and Health	Germán Antelo Vaca	CN
International Policy	Juan Enrique Jurado Ruíz	MAS
Land and Territory, Natural Resources, and Environment	Julio Salazar	MAS
Territorial Organization of the State and Autonomies	Mirtha Da Costa Ferreira	MAS
Indigenous Originary Peasant Nations and Peoples, and Interculturality	Marcelo Eulogio Antezana Ruiz	CN
Plural Economy, Production, Industry, and Industrialization	Fidel Surco Cañasaca	MAS
Source: "Senado definió comisiones y comités sin la oposición". Los Tiempos. 2 February 2011. p. 2. Archived from the original on 4 October 2012.

== Chamber of Deputies ==
The President of the Chamber of Deputies, elected on 19 January 2010, is Héctor Arce (MAS-IPSP). 33 of 130 deputies (25.38%) are women. Four parties elected deputies, the MAS-IPSP (including members of the Without Fear Movement) holds 88; the Plan Progress for Bolivia – National Convergence holds 37; the National Unity Front has 3; and Social Alliance holds 2. Sixty-nine seats were elected by individual districts (uninominal seats); 53 were elected from lists provided by each party in each department, with the number of such deputies determined by population (plurinominal seats); and seven were elected by minority indigenous peoples in the seven of the country's departments (all except Chuquisaca and Potosí). Altogether, 41 of the deputies were indigenous, including 9 women.

Department	Circumscription	Party	Senator	Substitute
Chuquisaca	Plurinominal	MAS	Marianela Paco Durán	Juan Carlos Apaza Macías
Chuquisaca	Plurinominal	MAS	Efraín Balderas Chávez	Marylin Partes Amachuy
Chuquisaca	Plurinominal	MAS	Flora Aguilar Fernández	Rodolfo Avilés Ayma
Chuquisaca	Plurinominal	PPB	René Vidal León	Virginia Segundina Ramírez Vedia
Chuquisaca	Plurinominal	PPB	Arminda Epifania Morales Calvimontes	Jaime Delgadillo Velásquez
Chuquisaca	C. 01	PPB	Juan Luis Gantier Zelada	Claudia Evelyn Ampuero Padilla
Chuquisaca	C. 02	PPB	Pedro Medrano Reyes	No Substitute
Chuquisaca	C. 03	MAS	Eliseo Sesgo Mostacedo	Laura Reyna Zarate
Chuquisaca	C. 04	MAS	Juan Barriga Montero	Ana Rodas Cuéllar
Chuquisaca	C. 05	MAS	Carlos Aparicio Vedia	Vicenta Zabala Rentería
Chuquisaca	C. 06	MAS	Irineo Condori Carlos	Esperanza Guevara
La Paz	Plurinominal	MAS	Héctor Enrique Arcé Zaconeta	Adelia Álvarez
La Paz	Plurinominal	MAS	Gilda Alcira Oporto Barrozo	Emilio Ruffo Rocha
La Paz	Plurinominal	MAS	Wilfredo Calani Choque	Maria Alanoca
La Paz	Plurinominal	MAS	Carmen Leonor Rodríguez Bolaños	Elias Quelca Mamani
La Paz	Plurinominal	MAS	Jorge Adalberto Choquetarqui Jahuircata	Paulina Rodríguez Huaras
La Paz	Plurinominal	MAS	Patricia Mancilla Martínez	Antonio Eliseo Suxo Suxo
La Paz	Plurinominal	MAS	Rodolfo Calle Inca	Maribel Teresa Vargas Sarabia
La Paz	Plurinominal	MAS	Julia Figueredo	Eufrén Carlos Troche Jiménez
La Paz	Plurinominal	MAS	Donato Rubén Callisaya Mayta	Lidia Paucara Mancilla
La Paz	Plurinominal	PPB	Alejandro Northon Zapata Avendaño	Blanca Constancia Gonzales Ríos
La Paz	Plurinominal	PPB	Ana María Sempértegui	Andrés Rolando Ortega Tarifa
La Paz	Plurinominal	UN	Rita Elisabet Reyes Limpias	Willy Aguilar Febrero
La Paz	Plurinominal	UN	Jaime Rolando Navarro Tardío	Flora Oyardo Mamani
La Paz	C. 07	MAS	Samuel Domingo Pamuri Mamani	Benancia Gutiérrez Flores
La Paz	C. 08	MAS	Javier Eduardo Zavaleta López	Gabriela Rosario Medina Garrón
La Paz	C. 09	MSM	Fabian II Yaksic Feraudy	Basilia Victoria Quispe
La Paz	C. 10	MSM	Miriam Marcela Revollo Quiroga	José Ángel Callao Jimenes
La Paz	C. 11	MAS	Osvaldo Guillermo Torrez Arisaca	Felicidad Suazo
La Paz	C. 13	MAS	Benedicta García	Rogelio Maydana Apaza
La Paz	C. 14	MAS	Lucio Marca Mamani	Carol Mireya Montaño Rocha
La Paz	C. 15	MAS	Roberto Rojas Herrera	Enriqueta Villarroel Poma
La Paz	C. 16	MAS	Hugo Mujica Aguilar	Carmen Susana Tellería Quispe
La Paz	C. 17	MAS	Lucio Huaycho Nina	Evarista María Mayta
La Paz	C. 18	MAS	Javier Adelio Paucara Llojlla	Pastora Jove
La Paz	C. 19	MAS	David Quispe Balboa	Genara Julia Quisbert Cuentas
La Paz	C. 20	MAS	Quintín Quispe Chura	Mercedes Mamani Tristán
La Paz	C. 21	MAS	Martín Quispe Julián	María Tupa Lovera
La Paz	C. 22	MAS	Samuel Plata Plata	Domitila Alcira Flores Cortez
La Paz	Indigenous 2	MAS	Jorge Medina Barra	Blanca Marilin Cartagena Chuqui
Cochabamba	Plurinominal	MAS	Rebeca Elvira Delgado	Samuel Pereira Ágreda
Cochabamba	Plurinominal	MAS	José Raúl Alborta Siles	Nora Revollo Balderrama
Cochabamba	Plurinominal	MAS	Cecilia Luisa Ayllón	Saúl Limbert Garabito Condori
Cochabamba	Plurinominal	MAS	Javier Adrián Santiváñez Camacho	Cinda Romero
Cochabamba	Plurinominal	MAS	Ibonne Daysi Luna Zeballos	Néstor Rivera Solís
Cochabamba	Plurinominal	PPB	Mauricio Ramiro Arturo Muñoz Encinas	Gladys Blanca Prieto Moreira
Cochabamba	Plurinominal	PPB	Norma Alicia Piérola	Apolinar Rivera Muñoz
Cochabamba	Plurinominal	PPB	José Hernán Paredes Sánchez	Ximena Nevenca Grágeda Orellana
Cochabamba	C. 12	MAS	Omar Velasco Pérez	Cresencia Alberta Padilla Flores
Cochabamba	C. 23	PPB	David Ángel Mejía Gareca	Neyva Paola Irma Zapata Montaño
Cochabamba	C. 24	PPB	Javier Alex Orozco Rosas	María Alejandra Prado Richter
Cochabamba	C. 25	MAS	Juan Carlos Claros Rodríguez	Natividad Choque Laura
Cochabamba	C. 26	MAS	Evaristo Peñaloza Alejo	Wilma Alejandrina Quiroz Mercado
Cochabamba	C. 27	MAS	Eugenio Luna Quintana	Miguelina Villarroel Lafuente
Cochabamba	C. 28	MAS	José Félix Mendieta Villarroel	Marcelina Villarroel Marín
Cochabamba	C. 29	MAS	Esteban Ramírez Torrico	Olivia Reyes García
Cochabamba	C. 30	MAS	Nelson Virreira Meneces	Juliana Mamani
Cochabamba	C. 31	MAS	Pedro Gutiérrez Cruz	Roberta Tinta Quiroga
Cochabamba	Indigenous 3	MAS	Eleuterio Guzmán Zelada	Luisa Guaguasu Isategua
Oruro	Plurinominal	MAS	Freddy German Huayta Veliz	Erika Margoth Manardy Canaviri
Oruro	Plurinominal	MAS	María Magdalena Chuca Gutiérrez	Doroteo Martínez Quinaya
Oruro	Plurinominal	PPB	Franz Gróver Choque Ulloa	Anghela Mejía Montecinos
Oruro	C. 32	MAS	Nelly Núñez Zegarra	Benjamín Flores Onori
Oruro	C. 33	MAS	Marcelo William Elío Chávez	Gliselda Mirian Blanco Apaza
Oruro	C. 34	MAS	Ever Lucas Moya Zarate	Cornelia Flores Choque
Oruro	C. 35	MAS	Edgar Contaja Huayta	Beatriz Flora Guzmán Gómez
Oruro	C. 36	MAS	Jaime Medrano Veizaga	Guillermina Astete Choquevillca
Oruro	Indigenous 4	MAS	Benigno Quispe Mamani	Toribia Álvaro Moya
Potosí	Plurinominal	MAS	Benito Ramos Calizaya	Francisca Mamani Canaviri
Potosí	Plurinominal	MAS	Flora Largo Pumari	Hugo Garcia Méndez
Potosí	Plurinominal	MAS	Adolfo Ocampo Melgarejo	Gladys Vargas Escobar
Potosí	Plurinominal	MAS	Agripina Ramírez Nava	Justino Leaño Quispe
Potosí	Plurinominal	MAS	Felipe Molloja Báez	Alejandra Cazón Ángelo
Potosí	Plurinominal	MAS	Emeliana Aiza Parada	No Substitute
Potosí	C. 37	AS	Ángel David Cortés Villegas	Elizabeth Soto Mamani
Potosí	C. 38	MAS	Juan Carlos Cejas Ugarte	Victoria Tola Mendoza
Potosí	C. 39	MAS	Luis Gallego Condori	Filomena Mamani Crispín
Potosí	C. 40	MAS	Richard Cordel Ramírez	Zenobia León Rojas
Potosí	C. 41	MAS	Severo Aguilar Gabriel	Rita Callahuara Amajaya
Potosí	C. 42	MAS	Eusebio Cruz Gonza	Magdalena Condori Vargas
Potosí	C. 43	MAS	Estanis Condori Cárdenas	Felipa Huanca Mamani
Potosí	C. 44	MAS	Pascual Huarachi Romero	Delia Alejo Porco
Tarija	Plurinominal	MAS	Luis Bertin Alfaro Arias	Carolina Mercedes Cazón Castrillo
Tarija	Plurinominal	MAS	Ninfa Huarachi Condori	Carlos Sandro Borda Valdez
Tarija	Plurinominal	PPB	Adrián Esteban Oliva Alcázar	Mirtha Natividad Arce Camacho
Tarija	C. 45	PPB	Víctor Hugo Zamora Castedo	Diana Patricia Paputsakis Burgos
Tarija	C. 46	PPB	Roy Moroni Cornejo Raña	No Substitute
Tarija	C. 47	MAS	José Antonio Yucra Paredes	Teresa Daine Blacutt Mendoza
Tarija	C. 48	AS	Wilman Ramon Cardozo Surriabre	Gladis Clara Mamani Quispe
Tarija	C. 49	MAS	Raúl Altamirano Trujillo	Senobia Gutiérrez Avendaño
Tarija	Indigenous 6	MAS	Federico Salazar Sánchez	Cristina Valeroso Cuéllar
Santa Cruz	Plurinominal	MAS	Betty Asunta Tejada Soruco	Mauro Peña Siles
Santa Cruz	Plurinominal	MAS	Edgar Luis Fernández	Gladys Aguilar Ramírez
Santa Cruz	Plurinominal	MAS	Segundina Flores Solamayo	Heinz Darwin Choquerive Sossa
Santa Cruz	Plurinominal	PPB	Jorge Antonio Flores Reus	Maria Odalis Reyes
Santa Cruz	Plurinominal	PPB	Adriana Gil Moreno	Moisés Fanor Salces Lozano
Santa Cruz	Plurinominal	PPB	Rafael Darío López Mercado	Jessica Roselin Echeverría Bravo
Santa Cruz	Plurinominal	PPB	Érica Roxana Claure	Juan Carlos Becerra Oroza
Santa Cruz	Plurinominal	PPB	Javier Leigue Herrera	Vanessa Moreno Otero
Santa Cruz	Plurinominal	PPB	Carmen Rosa Duran Soliz	Felipe Garcia Pérez
Santa Cruz	Plurinominal	PPB	Jaime Estívariz Bustillos	No Substitute
Santa Cruz	Plurinominal	UN	Oscar Antonio Franco Vaca	Maria Cristina Viscarra Gil
Santa Cruz	C. 50	PPB	Carlos Eduardo Subirana Gianella	Verónica Aguilera Salazar
Santa Cruz	C. 51	PPB	Maida Paz Callaú	Rodolfo Landívar Alba
Santa Cruz	C. 52	PPB	Rubén Darío Rojo Parada	Miriam Terrazas
Santa Cruz	C. 53	PPB	Tomás Xavier Monasterio Romay	Ana Maria Vaca Salvador
Santa Cruz	C. 54	PPB	Alcides Andrés Gallardo Ibarra	Maria Anette Daher Tobía
Santa Cruz	C. 55	MAS	Adriana Arias	Agustín Rivas Brito
Santa Cruz	C. 56	MAS	Edwin Tupa Tupa	Marcelina Ramírez
Santa Cruz	C. 57	MAS	German Alavi Canaviri	Basilia Flores Arce
Santa Cruz	C. 58	PPB	Luis Felipe Dorado Middagh	Maria Del Carmen España
Santa Cruz	C. 59	MAS	Wilson Changaray Taborga	Inés Miranda Kama
Santa Cruz	C. 60	MAS	Gonzalo Rodríguez Cámara	Cirila Coro Elías
Santa Cruz	C. 69	MAS	Franklin Garvizú Janco	Dalcy Herrera Morales
Santa Cruz	C. 70	PPB	Yusser Rolando Villarroel Garviso	Rosario Leonor Torrico
Santa Cruz	Indigenous 7	MAS	Bienvenido Zacu Mborobainchi	Teresa Nomine Chiqueno
Beni	Plurinominal	MAS	Ingrid Loreto Zabala Escobar	Jorge Callaú Allorto
Beni	Plurinominal	MAS	Miguel Ángel Ruiz Morales	Katya Chávez Debrie
Beni	Plurinominal	PPB	Osney Martínez Daguer	Yaqueline Emma Lavive Yáñez Simon
Beni	C. 61	PPB	Mezoth Jose Shriqui Rapp	Belia Antonia Cajiri Roca
Beni	C. 62	PPB	Farides Vaca Suárez	Carmelo Egüez Rodríguez
Beni	C. 63	MAS	Antonio Molina Serrano	Maria Gardenia Arauz Menacho
Beni	C. 64	PPB	Einar Gozalves Beyuma	Victoria Loras Ferreyra
Beni	C. 65	PPB	Juan Carlos Ojopi Barba	Leny Calle Rivera
Beni	Indigenous 8	MAS	Pedro Nuny Caity	Maria Sonia Justiniano Cujuy
Pando	Plurinominal	MAS	Galo Silvestre Bonifaz	Carlin Haensel Inuma
Pando	C. 66	PPB	Herbert Salvatierra Becerra	Mariluz Gonzales Rodríguez
Pando	C. 67	MAS	Juan Chamaro Nay	Katerine greenr Achipa
Pando	C. 68	PPB	Juan Rodríguez Lazo	Sandra Alixon Claure Endara
Pando	Indigenous 9	PPB	Julio Cortez Vira	Bertha Ramallo Hurtado

=== Commissions ===
The Chamber of Deputies has twelve legislative commissions (Spanish: comisión legislative), whose leadership is chosen annually. Their current leadership, chosen on 28 January 2011, is as follows:

Commission	President	Party of President
Constitution, Legislation, and Electoral System	Lucio Marca	MAS
Plural Justice, Prosecutor's Office (Spanish: Ministerio Público), and Legal Defense of the State	Cecelia Ayllón	MAS
International Policy and Protection of Migrants	Yusser R. Villarroel	CN
Social Policy	Antonio Franco	UN
Economic Policy Planning and Finance	Marcelo Elío	MAS
Education and Health	Alejandro Zapata	MAS
Amazon Region and Environment	Antonio Molina	MAS
Human Rights	Juan C. Cejas	MAS
Government, Defense, and Armed Forces	Irineo Condori	MAS
Territorial Organization of the State and Autonomies	Betty Tejada	MAS
Indigenous Originary Peasant Nations and Peoples, Cultures, and Interculturality	Jorge Medina	MAS
Plural Economy, Production, and Industry	Luis Alfaro	MAS
Source: "MAS controla 10 comisiones y oposición sólo 2 en Diputados". Página Siete. 2011-01-29. p. 2.
