= Farides Vaca =

Bolivian politician (born 1969)

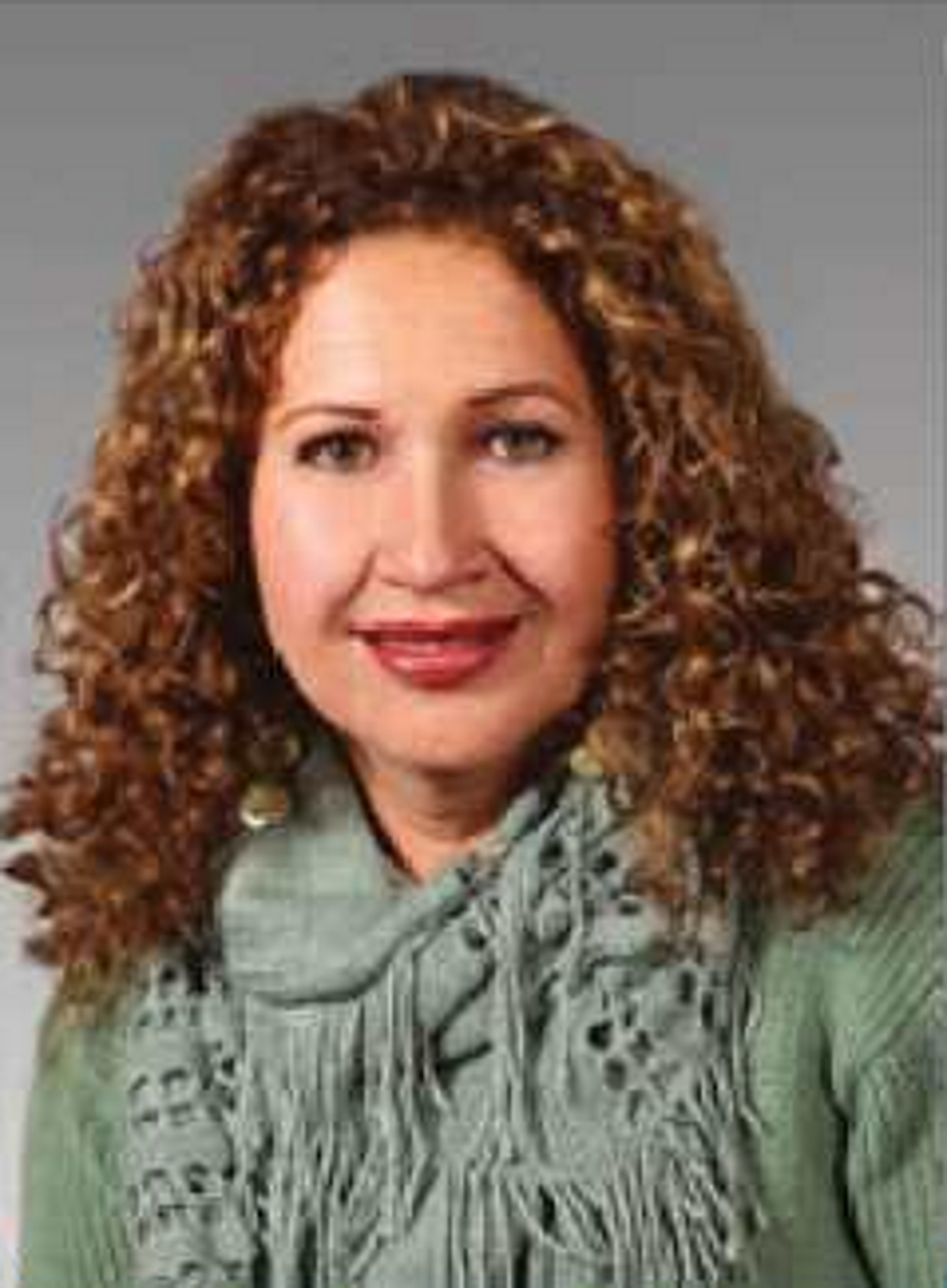
- Official portrait, 2014

Member of the Chamber of Deputies from Beni circumscription 62
- In office 10 February 2010 – 18 January 2015
- Substitute: Carmelo Egüez; Marco Antonio Takusi
- Preceded by: María Teresa Núñez
- Succeeded by: Ana Vidal (Note: Redistribution; circumscription 59.)
- Constituency: Ballivián; Marbán; Moxos

Personal details
- Born: Farides Vaca Suárez; 10 September 1969 (age 57) San Ignacio de Moxos, Beni, Bolivia
- Education: Center for Accelerated Secondary Education
- Occupation: Librarian; politician

Farides Vaca Suárez (born 10 September 1969) is a Bolivian librarian and politician who served as a member of the Chamber of Deputies from Beni, representing circumscription 62 from 2010 to 2015.

Vaca spent the majority of her professional career away from the political field, working as administrator of the 18 de Noviembre Hospital in San Ignacio de Moxos and as librarian of the Technical University of Beni's biochemistry and pharmacy center.

Despite her minimal political experience, Vaca was invited to contest a seat in the Chamber of Deputies as part of a push for renovation among the conservative opposition's leading cadres. After finishing her term in the legislature, Vaca moved on to regional government, forming part of Beni Governor Alejandro Unzueta's administration as departmental director of education and culture and, later, secretary of human development.

== Early life and career ==
Farides Vaca was born on 10 September 1969 in San Ignacio de Moxos, Beni, to Luis Vaca Áñez and Carmen Suárez Mendoza. Her mother made a living as a rural schoolteacher, while her father worked as the foreman of a nearby ranch. Due to her parents' vocations, Vaca spent much of her childhood in the care of her maternal grandparents up until her mother found employment in the city. She completed her early education at local schools in San Ignacio before traveling to La Paz to attend the city's Canadian Baptist Institute, simultaneously working as a secretary at the nearby San Martín de Porres Institute.

At age 17, Vaca returned to San Ignacio to deal with family matters, during which time she attended the Gilfredo Cortés Candía Women's School before finally graduating from the town's Center for Accelerated Secondary Education. Six months into her stay, she married a local lawyer, with whom she owned and operated a small San Ignacio-to-Trinidad transport business. After spending some time as administrator of San Ignacio's 18 de Noviembre Hospital, Vaca moved to Trinidad, the departmental capital, where, from 2002 to 2005, she served as the librarian of the Technical University of Beni's biochemistry and pharmacy center.

== Chamber of Deputies ==
=== Election ===
Vaca's entry into politics was facilitated through the National Convergence (CN) alliance, a loose consortium of political forces opposed to the ruling Movement for Socialism (MAS-IPSP). Formed to contest the 2009 general election, this fragmentary coalition provided ample autonomy for regional political leaders to designate candidates in their respective departments. In Beni, under the direction of Prefect Ernesto Suárez, CN placed its bets on political renovation, presenting a slate of mostly young candidates with minimal previous party experience. Such was the case with Vaca, who was invited to contest Beni's circumscription 62, an electoral district encompassing her home Moxos Province and the surrounding Ballivián and Marbán provinces. Vaca came out on top in one of the most closely contested races of the entire electoral cycle, defeating her MAS opponent by just over 100 votes. The immensely narrow margin reflected her district's uniquely divided demographics, split between rural indigenous peoples and recent highland peasant settlers affiliated with the MAS and Spanish-speaking urbanites whose pro-autonomy views aligned them with CN.

=== Tenure ===
Together with her colleague, Osney Martínez, Vaca was sworn into the Chamber of Deputies on 10 February 2010, twenty-two days after the Legislative Assembly had formally been installed. During her tenure, Vaca spent two non-consecutive terms on the chamber's Cultures Committee and one on its Community-based Economics Committee and was selected to chair the Agriculture Committee. Having served on its directorate since 2011, she was elected president of Beni's parliamentary delegation in 2012, which she presided over for one term. She capped off her parliamentary tenure as part of the lower chamber's directorate, where she served as third secretary until leaving office in 2015.

=== Commission assignments ===
- Chamber of Deputies Directorate (Third Secretary: 2014–2015)
- Plural Economy, Production, and Industry Commission
  - Agriculture and Animal Husbandry Committee (Secretary: 2011–2012)
  - Community-based Economics and Social Cooperatives Committee (2013–2014)
- Rural Native Indigenous Peoples and Nations, Cultures, and Interculturality Commission
  - Cultures, Interculturality, and Cultural Heritage Committee (2010–2011, 2012–2013)

== Later political career ==
Upon the conclusion of her tenure in the Chamber of Deputies, Vaca retired from national politics, though not from public service. In 2021, she sought to represent the Moxos Province in the Beni Departmental Legislative Assembly on behalf of the Third System Movement (MTS). Although Beni's unique electoral system effectively guaranteed the minority party one seat per province, the MTS's third-place finish in Moxos precluded Vaca from entering the legislature. Nonetheless, the successful election of the MTS's Alejandro Unzueta to the Beni governorship opened avenues for Vaca to continue in public administration. She was made departmental director of education and culture before entering Unzueta's cabinet in early 2022, where she served as secretary of human development.

== Electoral history ==
Electoral history of Farides Vaca
Year	Office	Alliance	Votes			Result	Ref.
Year	Office	Alliance	Total	%	P.	Result	Ref.
2009	Deputy	National Convergence	5,956	44.71%	1st	Won	
2021	Assemblywoman	Third System Movement	1,111	17.49%	3rd	Lost	
Source: Plurinational Electoral Organ | Electoral Atlas

Chamber of Deputies of Bolivia
Preceded by María Teresa Núñez	Member of the Chamber of Deputies from Beni circumscription 62; 2010–2015	Succeeded by Ana Vidal
Preceded by Carlos Subirana	Third Secretary of the Chamber of Deputies; 2014–2015	Succeeded by Erik Morón
