= René Vidal =

René Vidal may refer to:

- René Vidal Basauri (fl. 1970s–1980s), Chilean army officer and government minister
- René Vidal (engineer) (born 1974), Chilean electrical engineer and computer scientist
- René Vidal León (1931–2012), Bolivian politician and trade unionist
- René Vidal Merino (1901–1987), Chilean army officer and politician
- René Vidal (wrestler), Cuban wrestler, competed in the 1975 Pan American Games

== See also ==
- René Bidal (born 1960), French civil servant
