= Samuel Plata =

Bolivian politician (1970–2021)

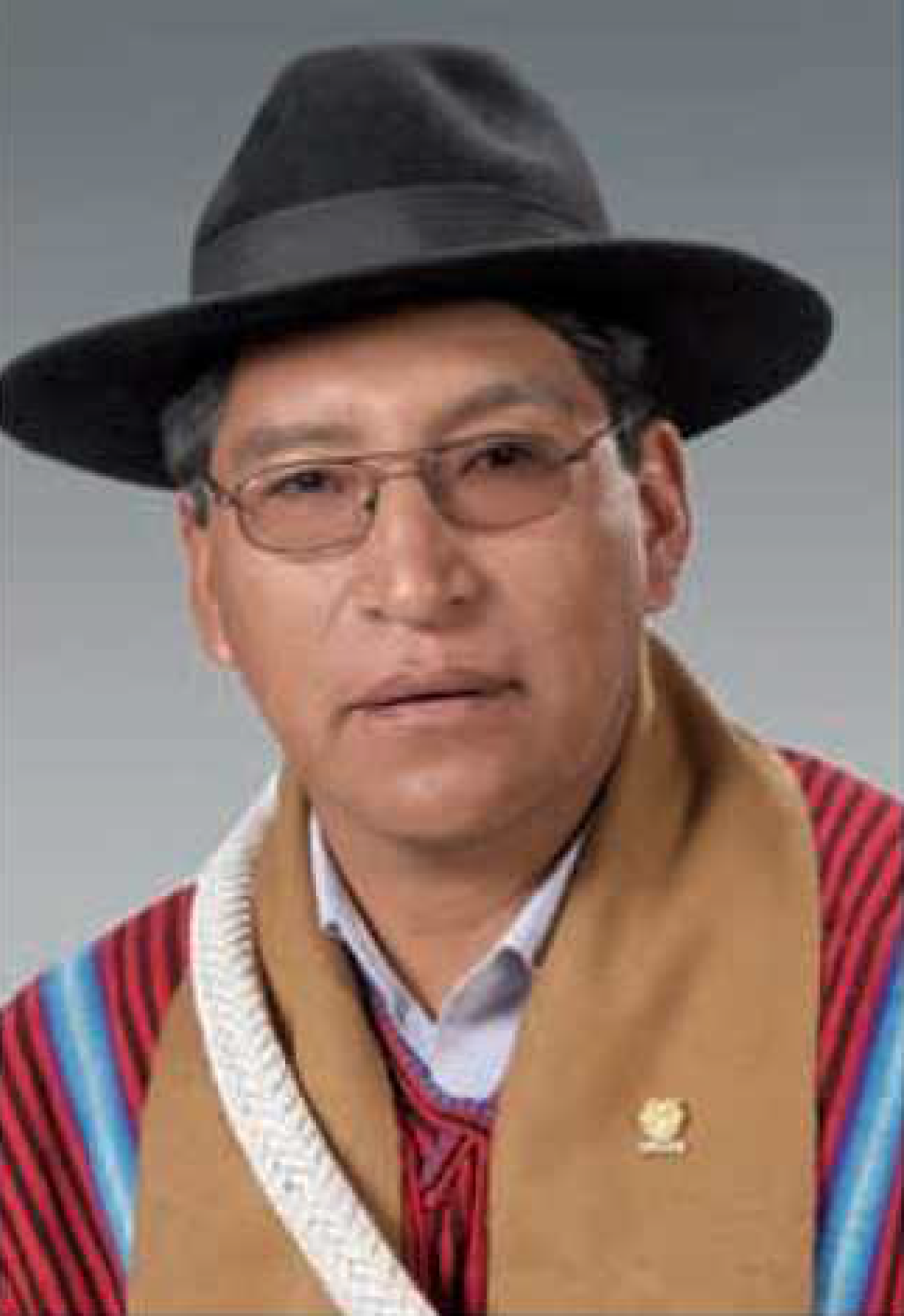
- Official portrait, 2014

Member of the Chamber of Deputies from La Paz circumscription 22
- In office 19 January 2010 – 18 January 2015
- Substitute: Domitila Flores
- Preceded by: Víctor Márquez
- Succeeded by: Rubén Chambi (Note: Redistribution; circumscription 19.)
- Constituency: Ingavi; Pacajes; Pando

Personal details
- Born: Samuel Plata Plata; 9 November 1970 Chuncarcota de Machaca, La Paz, Bolivia
- Died: 7 March 2021 (aged 50) El Alto, La Paz, Bolivia
- Party: Movement for Socialism
- Occupation: Auto mechanic; politician

Samuel Plata Plata (9 November 1970 – 7 March 2021) is a Bolivian auto mechanic and politician who served as a member of the Chamber of Deputies from La Paz, representing circumscription 22 from 2010 to 2015. Born in a peasant community in the Altiplano plateau, Plata scaled the ranks of traditional leadership, serving as president of the Chuncarcota school board, mallku of his Aymara township, and finally, jach'a mallku cantonal of the three ayllus in the Urinsaya Marka, the sector's highest indigenous authority. Plata's prominent local presence led regional peasant sectors to nominate him as their representative in the Legislative Assembly, with the Movement for Socialism sponsoring his successful candidacy for a seat in the Chamber of Deputies.

== Early life and career ==
Samuel Plata was born on 9 November 1970, one of ten children born to Daniel Plata and Manuela Plata, a peasant family native to Chuncarcota de Machaca, situated on western La Paz's Altiplano plateau. Together with his siblings, Plata was raised practicing subsistence farming, even as he simultaneously attended the local primary school, where he excelled as a student. As his school only ran up to fifth grade, Plata continued his studies one town over in Conchacollo de Machaca and later in the municipal capital, San Andrés de Machaca, a two-and-a-half hour bike trek he made daily.

As a teenager, Plata moved to El Alto, where he studied to become an auto mechanic. He practiced that profession at various workshops in the city and did maintenance on heavy machinery for private companies. During this time, Plata became active in local community leadership, participating in events and meetings convened by the Villa Exaltación neighborhood council. By age 17, Plata had risen to become the organization's secretary of relations.

Even as Plata's presence in El Alto grew, he maintained links to his indigenous community, collaborating with social organizations to organize sporting events and other activities for the town. Over time, Plata's visits became more frequent, and by 2003, he had re-settled in Chuncarcota, where he was elected president of the town's school board. The following year, Plata was named mallku, an indigenous authority charged with leading and representing the community before the municipal government and other institutions. By 2005, Plata had risen to become jach'a mallku cantonal, the highest indigenous authority of the sector, representing the three ayllus that make up the Urinsaya Marka. (Note: Per indigenous custom, the Aymara realm (Qullasuyu) is divided between suyus (provinces) made up of markas (regions), agglomerations of multiple autonomous ayllus, the collective landholdings of the Aymara. They are represented by a mallku (traditional leader) elected through usos y costumbres. The San Andrés de Machaca Municipality is divided into two markas: Aransaya and Urinsaya, each one made up of three ayllus.)

== Chamber of Deputies ==
=== Election ===
In the leadup to the 2009 general election, Plata was put forward by his community to run for the region's seat in the Chamber of Deputies. He faced nine other pre-candidates for the nomination, each representing their respective municipalities. After a public event in the Taraco Municipality where each contestant presented their proposals and initiatives, Plata was finally selected from among the contenders to represent the Ingavi Province on the ballot. He registered his candidacy with the Movement for Socialism, with whom he won the election by an overwhelming margin.

=== Tenure ===
Once in the Legislative Assembly, Plata was selected to chair La Paz's parliamentary delegation in his first year. He served in different committees within the Government, Defense, and Armed Forces Commission for two non-consecutive years and was a member of the Constitutional Development and Legislation Committee for three, chairing said body as its secretary in his final two years in office. Upon the conclusion of his term, Plata was not nominated for reelection and was unable to contest local office due to a controversial ruling by the Supreme Electoral Tribunal stating that outgoing legislators did not meet residency requirements because their primary residence had been La Paz for the past two years. Plata was among the many legislators who protested the decision, presenting in his final days in office a bill to suspend electoral authorities who "put at risk" the rights of Bolivian citizens to participate in politics. He died in El Alto on 7 March 2021.

==== Commission assignments ====
- Constitution, Legislation, and Electoral System Commission
  - Constitutional Development and Legislation Committee (2011–2012; Secretary: 2013–2015)
- Government, Defense, and Armed Forces Commission
  - Defense, Armed Forces, Borders, and Civil Defense Committee (2012–2013)
  - Public Security Committee (2010–2011)

== Electoral history ==
Electoral history of Samuel Plata
Year	Office	Party	Votes			Result	Ref.
Year	Office	Party	Total	%	P.	Result	Ref.
2009	Deputy	Movement for Socialism	45,758	88.41%	1st	Won	
Source: Plurinational Electoral Organ | Electoral Atlas

Chamber of Deputies of Bolivia
Preceded by Víctor Márquez	Member of the Chamber of Deputies from La Paz circumscription 22; 2010–2015	Succeeded by Rubén Chambi
