= René Vidal (politician) =

Bolivian politician (1931–2012)

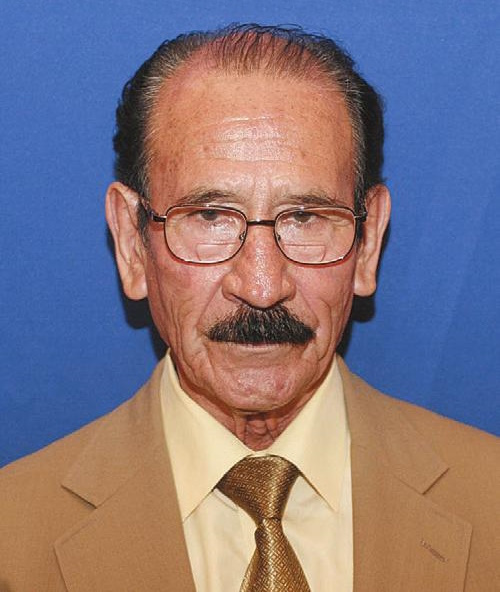
- Official portrait, 2010

Member of the Chamber of Deputies from Chuquisaca
- In office 19 January 2010 – 12 May 2012
- Substitute: Virginia Ramírez
- Preceded by: Lourdes Millares
- Succeeded by: Virginia Ramírez
- Constituency: Party list

Personal details
- Born: René Vidal León; 7 April 1931 Tarabuco, Chuquisaca, Bolivia
- Died: 12 May 2012 (aged 81) Sucre, Bolivia
- Occupation: Politician; trade unionist

René Vidal León (7 April 1931 – 12 May 2012) was a Bolivian politician and trade unionist who served as a party-list member of the Chamber of Deputies from Chuquisaca from 2010 until his death in 2012. He previously served on the Sucre Municipal Council from 2000 to 2004.

Vidal spent his early career as a laborer in the petroleum industry, during which time he became active as a representative of the sector's workers' unions. After retiring, he dedicated himself to commercial transport, heading multiple local and regional drivers' unions in the Chuquisaca Department.

Elected to the Sucre Municipal Council in 1999, Vidal continued to be active in politics throughout the 2000s. In 2009, as a product of the drivers' union's alliance with National Convergence, he was elected to represent Chuquisaca in the Chamber of Deputies. At nearly 80 years old, Vidal was the eldest member of parliament and died in office just two years into his term.

== Early life and career ==
=== Early life and education ===
René Vidal was born on 7 April 1931 in Tarabuco, Chuquisaca. The third of five siblings, Vidal's early life was marked by orphanhood: his father died as a combatant in the Chaco War, and his mother died shortly thereafter. Together with his younger sisters, Vidal settled in Sucre, where they operated a small grocery store. He attended the city's Salesian school up until the fifth grade and later enrolled in night courses to finish out his studies.

=== Career and trade unionism ===
Starting from the mid-1950s, Vidal began working as a driller in the employment of the Williams Brothers petroleum corporation. During this time, he played an active role in the sector's trade syndicates, serving as general secretary of his company's workers' union before being elected to represent the entire industry's laborers.

Long retired from the petroleum business, Vidal dedicated himself to commercial activities in the transportation sector. He bought his own truck and joined the Sucre Heavy Transport Syndicate, quickly rising to become the organization's general secretary for nine years. He later served as head of the Syndical Federation of Drivers of Chuquisaca for a decade in the 1990s, in addition to holding leadership positions within the national drivers' confederation.

== Chamber of Deputies ==
=== Election ===
In contrast to most other trade syndicates – historically leftist in nature – Bolivia's drivers' unions had long been more conservatively oriented, a fact that led the political right to frequently benefit the sector's leaders with positions of executive and legislative authority. For his part, Vidal attained his first elective position in the ranks of Nationalist Democratic Action, winning a seat as a substitute member of the Sucre Municipal Council in 1999; a subsequent bid for reelection on behalf of the National Unity Front in 2004 ended in failure.

In 2009, Vidal's drivers' union sealed a deal with National Convergence to jointly contest that year's election – the agreement was unique in that it split Chuquisaca's motorists off from the decision taken by the other eight departments, all of which had elected to back the ruling Movement for Socialism. The pact granted the department's drivers a quota of representatives on National Convergence's parliamentary slate. Having reserved the top party-list slot for himself, Vidal was easily elected to represent Chuquisaca in the Chamber of Deputies.

=== Tenure ===
Aged 79 at the time of his inauguration, Vidal was the seniormost member of the 1st Plurinational Legislative Assembly. His advanced age contrasted with the primarily youthful roster of legislators elected in 2009, who – at the time – collectively constituted the youngest-ever parliament since the democratic transition. Furthermore, in a country where the election of legislators older than 70 represents a rare event and those over 75 years of age are exceptional, Vidal stood out as one of the eldest first-term parliamentarians in Bolivian history. Owing to his age, Vidal initiated his term already suffering from chronic heart problems, for which he used a pacemaker. He ultimately died in office midway into his tenure after suffering from heart failure while residing in Sucre. His vacant seat was filled by his substitute, Virginia Ramírez, who was sworn in to complete the remainder of Vidal's term.

=== Commission assignments ===
- Constitution, Legislation, and Electoral System Commission
  - Constitutional Development and Legislation Committee (2012)
- Plural Economy, Production, and Industry Commission
  - Community-based Economics and Social Cooperatives Committee (2011–2012)
- Education and Health Commission
  - Health, Sports, and Recreation Committee (2010–2011)

== Electoral history ==
Electoral history of René Vidal
Year	Office	Alliance	Votes			Result	Ref.
Year	Office	Alliance	Total	%	P.	Result	Ref.
1999	Substitute councillor	Nationalist Democratic Action	10,832	15.86%	3rd	Won	(Note: Presented on an electoral list. The data shown represents the share of the vote the entire party/alliance received in that constituency.)
2004	Substitute councillor	National Unity Front	1,894	2.15%	7th	Lost	
2009	Deputy	National Convergence	76,722	33.60%	2nd	Won	
Source: Plurinational Electoral Organ | Electoral Atlas

Chamber of Deputies of Bolivia
Preceded by Lourdes Millares	Member of the Chamber of Deputies from Chuquisaca; 2010–2012	Succeeded by Virginia Ramírez
