= Felipe Molloja =

Bolivian politician (born 1956)

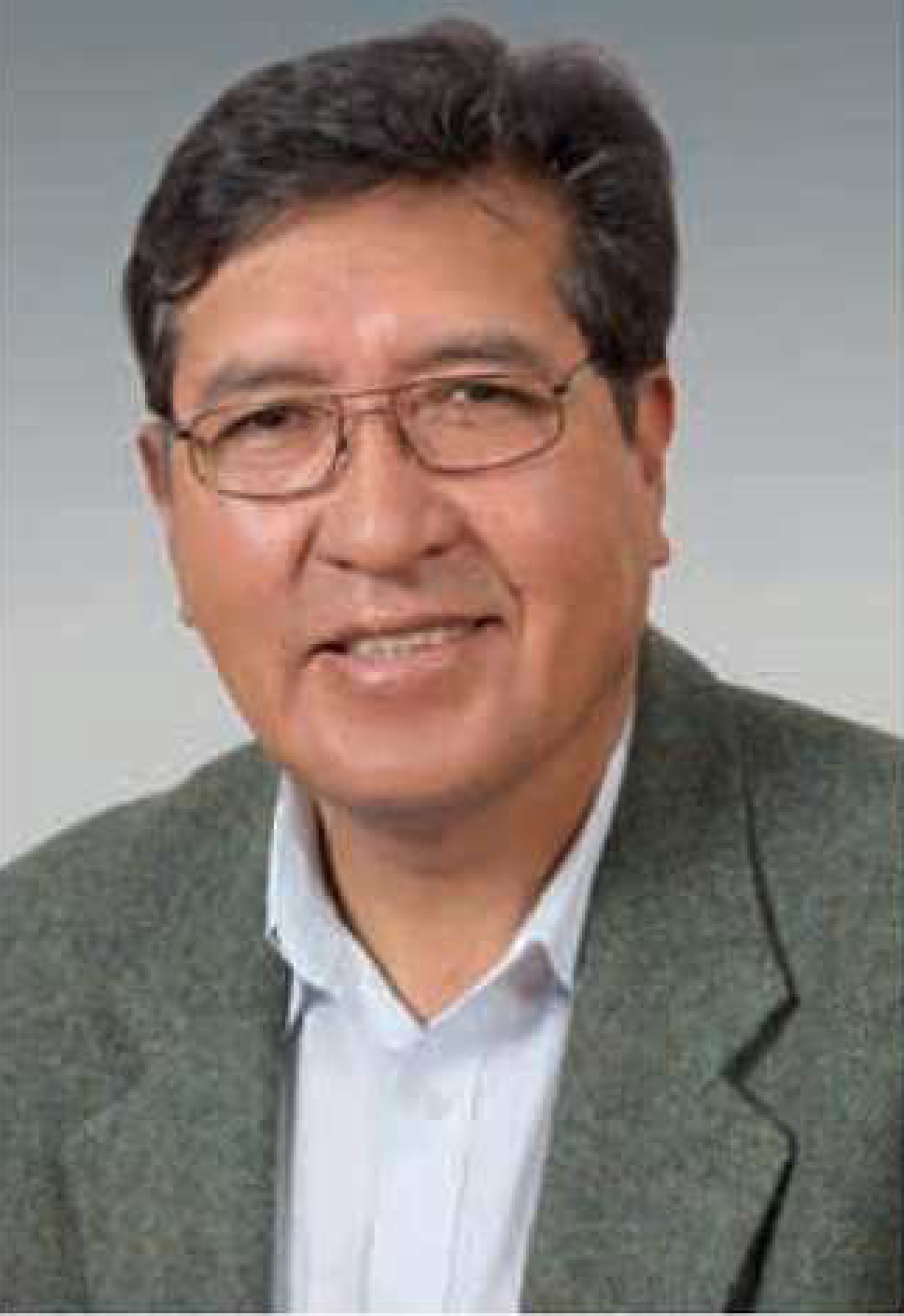
- Official portrait, 2014

Member of the Chamber of Deputies from Potosí
- In office 19 January 2010 – 18 January 2015
- Substitute: Alejandra Cazón
- Preceded by: Felipe Flores
- Succeeded by: Fidel Colque
- Constituency: Party list

Personal details
- Born: Felipe Molloja Báez; 23 August 1956 (age 69) Chipihuayco, Potosí, Bolivia
- Party: Fearless Movement (1999–2014)
- Other political affiliations: Revolutionary Nationalist Movement (until 1999)
- Occupation: Politician; trade unionist

Felipe Molloja Báez (born 23 August 1956) is a Bolivian politician and trade unionist who served as a party-list member of the Chamber of Deputies from Potosí from 2010 to 2015. Raised in rural poverty, Molloja developed his career within the Omiste Province's trade union structure, holding leadership roles in various local, provincial, and regional agrarian and peasant syndicates. In 1999, he joined the ranks of the newly founded Fearless Movement, with whom he competed for the Villazón mayoralty in 2004, taking second place and attaining a seat on the municipal council. For the 2009 general elections, as part of his party's alliance with the Movement for Socialism, Molloja was elected to represent Potosí in the Chamber of Deputies. Within months of taking office, the Fearless Movement split with the ruling party, with Molloja joining his compatriots in forming a small breakaway caucus in the lower chamber.

== Early life and career ==
Felipe Molloja was born on 23 August 1956 to Crisóstomo Molloja and Fidela Báez, a peasant family from the rural community of Chipihuayco in Potosí's southernly Omiste Province. (Note: The Omiste Province is made up of one municipality: Villazón. As such, both names are effectively interchangeable. For clarity, usage of 'Villazón' has been limited to the context of municipal administration.) Molloja spent his childhood in poverty, studying up to fifth grade—the educational terminus for most students in the region—at which point he left school to dedicate himself to goat herding. He entered public service within the framework of his rural community, scaling the ranks of southern Potosí's trade union structure. As a young adult, he joined the local agrarian syndicate, serving as its secretary from 1983 to 1984. In 1986, Molloja was designated corregidor of the Chipihuayco Canton, the most important political position within his ayllu.

Around this time, Molloja became an active member of the Omiste Province Peasant Center, serving as its general secretary from 1989 to 1993. In tandem, he assumed leadership positions within the encompassing Southern Potosí Peasant Federation, where he served as executive secretary from 1991 to 1993. Molloja's participation in local peasant unions opened avenues for his entry into politics, especially following the passage of the Law of Popular Participation, which granted civil society organizations increased capacity to collaborate with and supervise municipal authorities. One such supervising body was the Villazón Vigilance Committee, of which Molloja served as vice president from 1998 to 2000 in his capacity as secretary of relations of the Omiste Peasant Center.

== Political career ==
A lifelong member of the Revolutionary Nationalist Movement, Molloja grew disenfranchised with the party in the final years of the twentieth century. In 1999, he joined the Integration Movement, a local civic group affiliated with the recently founded Fearless Movement (MSM), with which it contested that year's municipal election in Villazón. The party won a majority of votes that election cycle, with Molloja serving as a public official in the municipal government from 2000 to 2003. The following year, he sought the mayoralty but landed in second place, though he did attain a seat on the Villazón Municipal Council.

In 2009, as part of the alliance between the MSM and the Movement for Socialism (MAS), Molloja was invited to contest a seat in the Chamber of Deputies. Though he initially rejected the offer—having set his sights on a rematch for the Villazón mayoralty—Molloja was convinced to accept the nomination. He was one of four MSM deputies elected off of the MAS's 2009 parliamentary ticket and the only one not representing the La Paz Department. Together with his MSM colleagues, Molloja composed part of a fifth caucus in the Chamber of Deputies that broke away from the MAS following the rupture in their shared alliance. In legislation, Molloja spent his entire term on various committees in the chamber's Amazon Region, Land, Territory, Water, Natural Resources, and Environment Commission, developing bills aimed at enhancing Potosí agriculture sector and water infrastructure. Though the MSM presented its own slate of candidates for the 2014 general election, Molloja did not seek reelection.

== Electoral history ==
Electoral history of Felipe Molloja
Year	Office	Party	Alliance	Votes			Result	Ref.
Year	Office	Party	Alliance	Total	%	P.	Result	Ref.
2004	Mayor (Note: Per Article 3 Section VI of the 1967 Constitution with amendments from 1995, individuals who appear at the top of a party's electoral list of councillors are also that party's candidate for mayor.)	Fearless Movement	None	1,265	12.97%	2nd	Partial	(Note: Presented on an electoral list. The data shown represents the share of the vote the entire party/alliance received in that constituency.)
2009	Deputy	Fearless Movement	Movement for Socialism	243,855	78.32%	1st	Won	
Source: Plurinational Electoral Organ | Electoral Atlas

Chamber of Deputies of Bolivia
Preceded by Felipe Flores	Member of the Chamber of Deputies from Potosí; 2010–2015	Succeeded by Fidel Colque
