= Flora Largo =

Bolivian politician (born 1974)

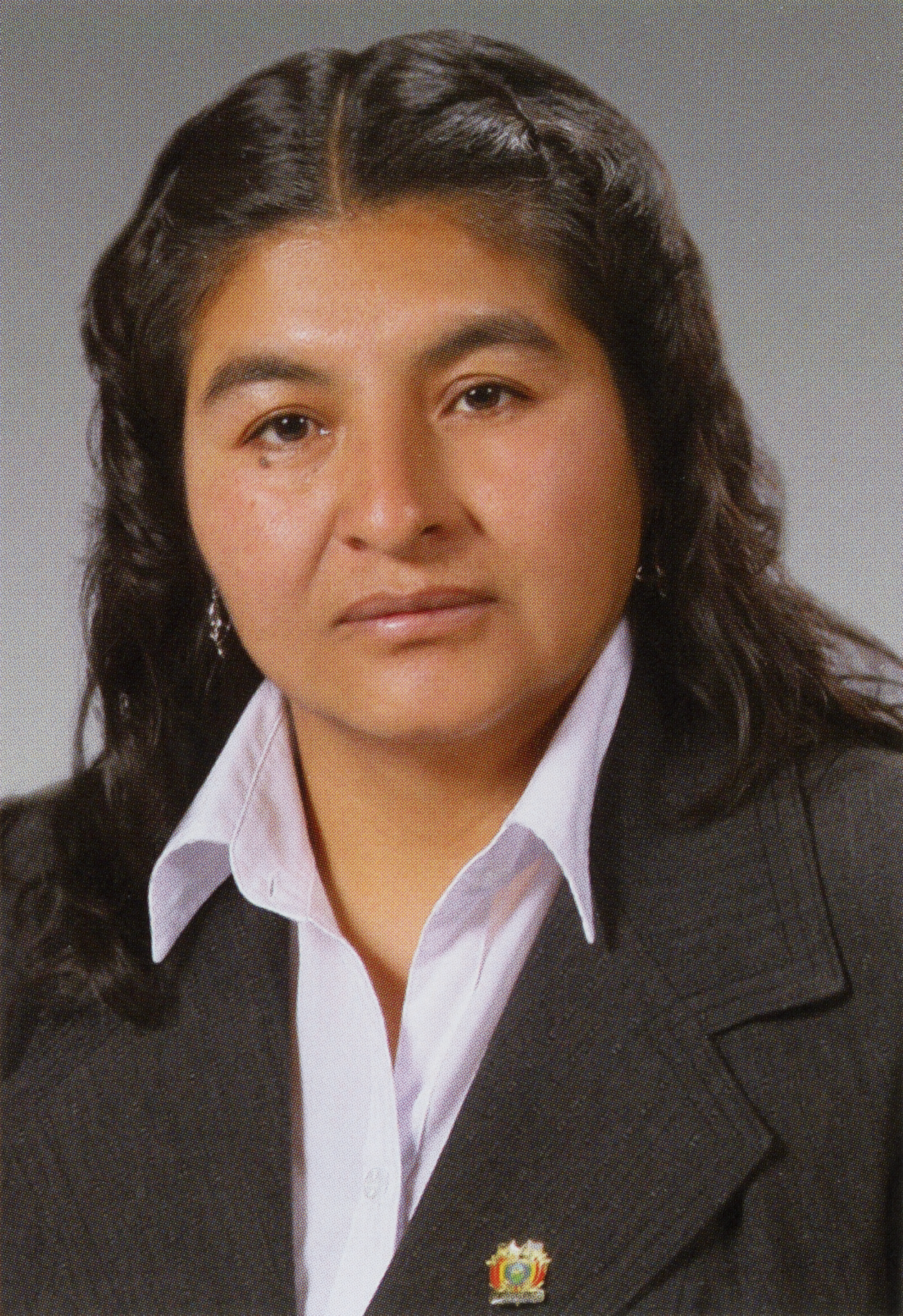
- Official portrait, 2014

Member of the Chamber of Deputies from Potosí
- In office 19 January 2010 – 18 January 2015
- Substitute: Hugo García
- Preceded by: Ximena Flores
- Succeeded by: Trinidad Rojas
- Constituency: Party list

Personal details
- Born: Flora Largo Pumari; 22 December 1974 (age 51) Potosí, Bolivia
- Party: Movement Toward Socialism
- Education: Tomás Frías University
- Occupation: Economist; politician

Flora Largo Pumari (Note: In this Spanish name, the first or paternal surname is Largo and the second or maternal family name is Pumari.) (born 22 December 1974) is a Bolivian economist and politician who represented Potosí in the Chamber of Deputies from 2010 to 2015.

Largo was born into a family of rural origins that migrated to Potosí. She studied economics at Tomás Frías University and held leadership positions in the local students' union between 1996 and 2002. In 2003, she joined the Movement Toward Socialism, attracted by its appeal to the peasant movement.

Between 2004 and 2008, Largo worked as a public servant in the Chamber of Deputies, and served as president of the congressional staff union from 2006 to 2008. In 2009, her party ran her for a proportional representation seat representing Potosí Department, which she won. She was not nominated for reelection.

== Early life and career ==
Flora Largo was born on 22 December 1974 in Potosí. Her parents had migrated from the rural hamlet of Pati Pati, near Chullchucani in Tomás Frías Province, in search of better opportunities. Largo's father found work as a mason and later as a mineworker. Though raised in Potosí, Largo often returned to Pati Pati to help her parents during the harvest season. She was one of six children.

Largo completed her primary education at a Fe y Alegría school and earned her baccalaureate from the Potosí lyceum. She studied at Tomás Frías University, graduating with a degree in economics in 2002. Through her sister, she became involved in campus activism and held leadership positions in the local students' union. From 1996 to 1997, she served as press and propaganda secretary, and from 1997 to 1998 as finance secretary in the Faculty of Economic Sciences. During her final term, from 2001 to 2002, she was a student delegate to the Economics Program Council.

In 2003, Largo joined the Potosí branch of the Peasant Agricultural Corporation, a social enterprise founded by the CSUTCB to improve peasant livelihoods. That role initiated her ties to the Movement Toward Socialism (MAS), a political party which drew its core support from the peasant movement. That same year, she joined the party as a grassroots member. In 2004, the MAS invited her to work in La Paz as a public servant in the legislature. She served as an advisor in the Chamber of Deputies from 2004 to 2008 and was president of the congressional staff union from 2006 to 2008. She has a daughter, and as of 2014 was a single parent.

== Chamber of Deputies ==
=== Election ===
Largo took part in major peasant marches that pressed for the passage of agrarian reform and a new constitution, key priorities of the ruling MAS in 2006 and 2008. In 2009, the party included her on its slate of candidates to represent Potosí Department in the Chamber of Deputies. The MAS won the department in a landslide in that election, capturing all six of Potosí's proportionally allocated seats.

=== Tenure ===
In office, Largo stated that she would prioritize projects that benefited rural areas. Her agenda reflected the broader context of Potosí, long Bolivia's poorest department. In 2010, following mass protests, the Evo Morales administration pledged several public works projects to improve conditions in the region. Largo stated that her duty was to "see [these] through to execution – ensuring that they do not remain merely on paper". However, falling commodity prices left many of these projects unfinished, contributing to renewed unrest after the end of her term. She was not nominated for reelection, consistent with the MAS's indifference toward developing lengthy legislative careers among its lawmakers.

=== Commission assignments ===
- Planning, Economic Policy, and Finance Commission
  - Planning and Public Investment Committee (Secretary: 2010–2011)
  - Financial, Monetary, and Insurance Policy Committee (2011–2012)
- International Relations and Migrant Protection Commission
  - International Relations, Migrant Protection, and International Organizations Committee (Secretary: 2012–2014)
  - International Economic Relations Committee (2014–2015)
- Ethics Commission (2013–2014)

== Electoral history ==
Electoral history of Flora Largo
Year	Office		Party	Votes			Result	Ref.
Year	Office		Party	Total	%	P.	Result	Ref.
2009	Deputies	L-2	Movement Toward Socialism	243,855	78.32	1st	Won	(Note: Presented on an electoral list. The data shown represents the share of the vote the entire party/alliance received in that constituency.)
Source: Plurinational Electoral Organ | Electoral Atlas

Chamber of Deputies of Bolivia
Preceded by Ximena Flores	Member of the Chamber of Deputies from Potosí; 2010–2015	Succeeded by Trinidad Rojas
