= Segundina Flores =

Bolivian ambassador and activist

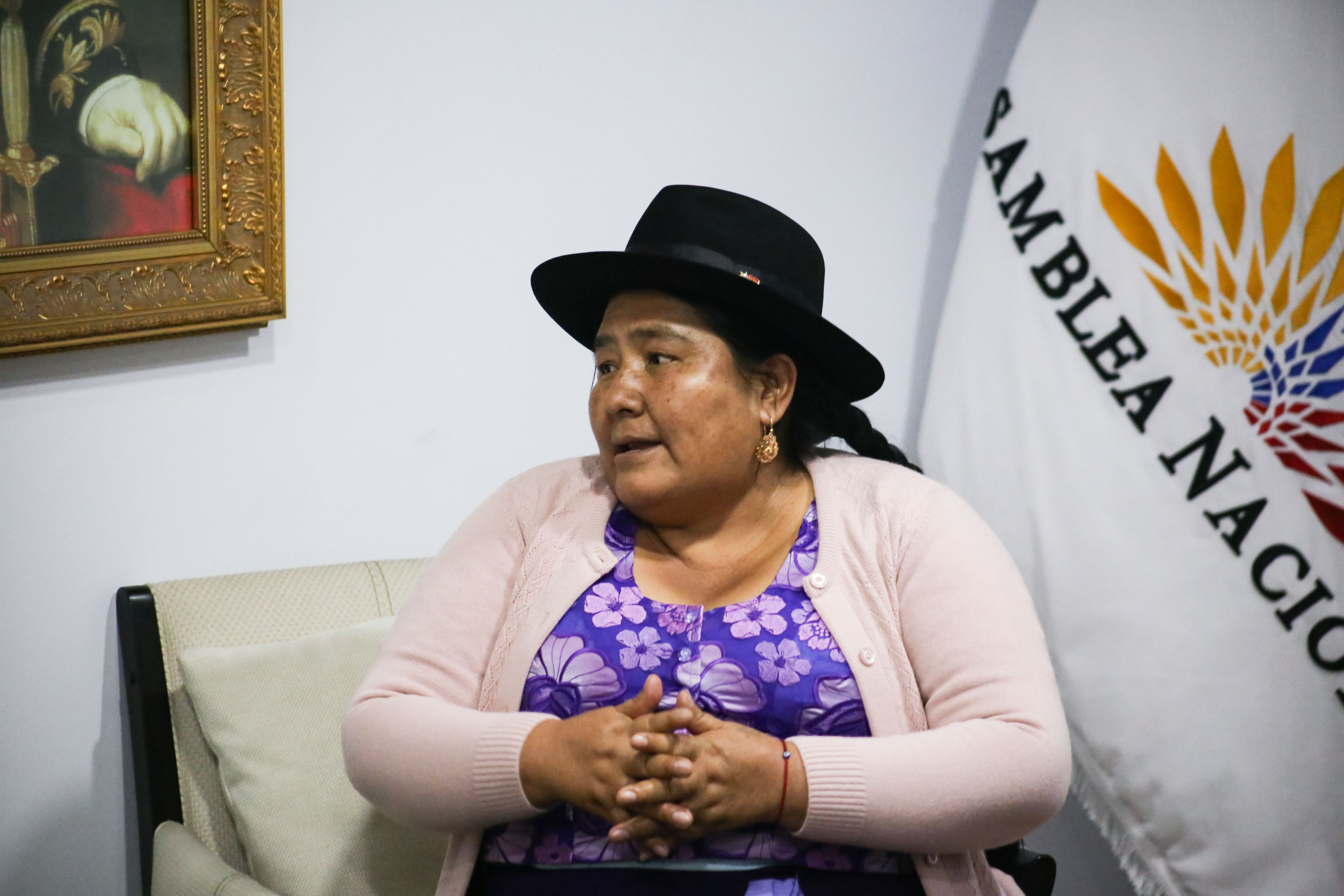
- in December 2024
- Born: 30 March 1968 (age 58); Oropeza Province
- Occupation: politician
- Known for: leader of women's movement and Minister of Culture
- Political party: Movement for Socialism (MAS)

Segundina Flores Solamayo (born 30 March 1968) is a politician, Bolivian ambassador and activist. She was a Movement for Socialism (MAS) Deputy in to the 1st Plurinational Legislative Assembly of Bolivia in 2010.

== Life ==
Flores was born in 1968 in Oropeza Province.

Flores was elected as a Movement for Socialism (MAS) Deputy in 2010 to the 1st Plurinational Legislative Assembly of Bolivia. She was one of 33 women elected to the 130 strong assembly.

In 1994 she was the women's leader in Santa Cruz of the Bartolina Sisa Confederation and she became the conferation's executive. In 2019 she was invited to the United Nations to celebrate International Mother Earth Day as a representative of the Bartolina Sisa confederation.

In 2020 "her" President Evo Morales was involved in choosing a new Governor of Santa Cruz. He endorsed the former Mayor of Warnes, Mario Cronenbold, but he withdrew his support when Cronenbold made statements in favor of not prosecuting an anti-Morales activist. Someone threw a plastic chair at Morales in what became known as the "silletazo." The "silletazo" was met by various reactions. Flores supported Morales noting that he "deserves respect" and people "cannot be bouncing around with chairs." However, she also pointed out candidates should not be chosen by the pointing of a finger.

In 2024 she was Bolivia's ambassador to Ecuador when the Ecuadorian government raided the Mexican embassy to retrieve an ex-vice president, Jorge Glas, who was avoiding justice. Flores was summoned by Bolivia in response to the invasion of an embassy.
