= Freddy Huayta =

Bolivian politician (born 1968)

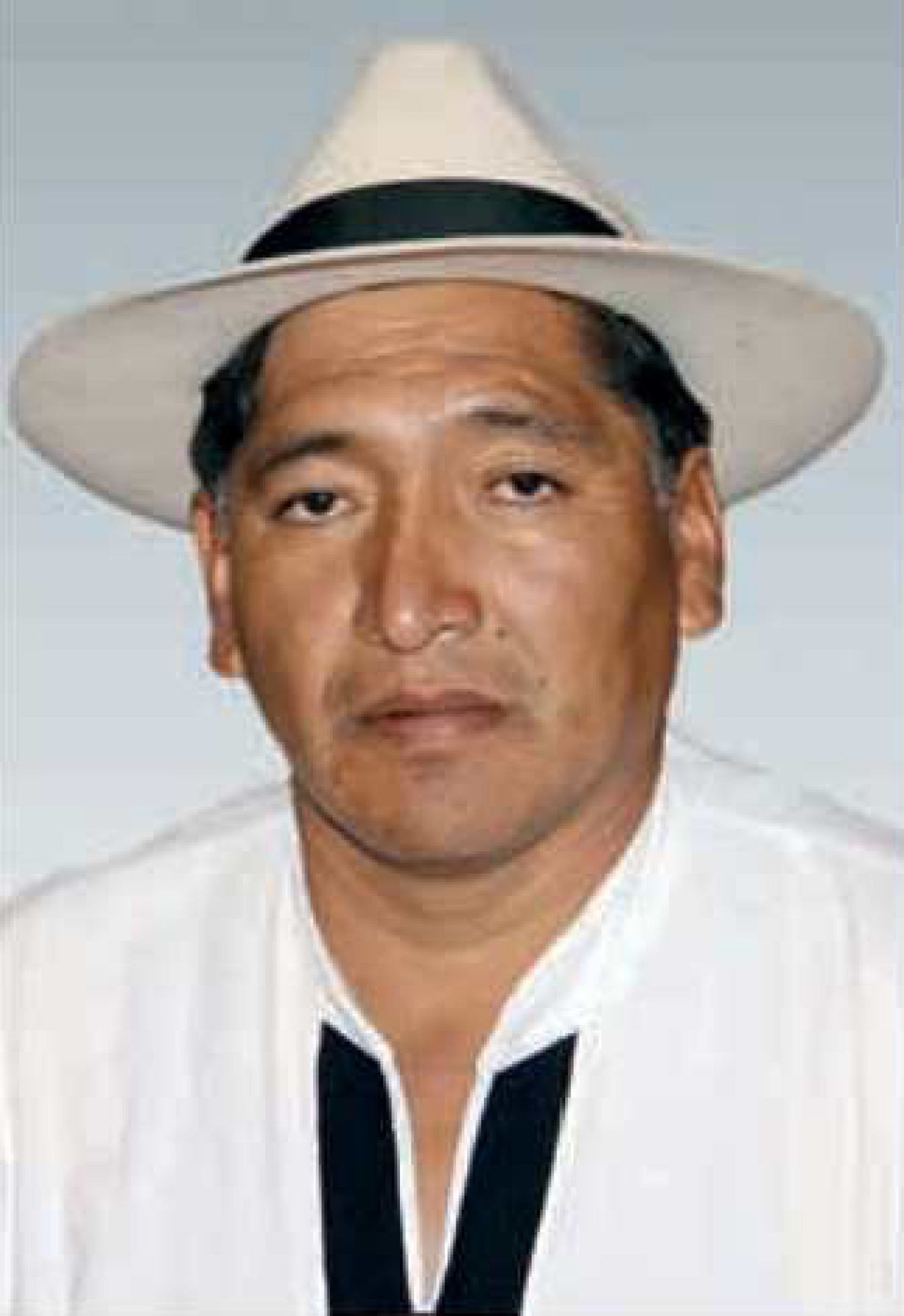
- Official portrait, 2014

Member of the Chamber of Deputies from Oruro
- In office 19 January 2010 – 18 January 2015
- Substitute: Erika Manardy
- Preceded by: Ricardo Aillón
- Succeeded by: Aniceto Choque
- Constituency: Party list

Personal details
- Born: Freddy Germán Huayta Véliz; 12 May 1968 (age 58) Estancia Jarenilla, Oruro, Bolivia
- Party: Alternative Civic Integration (since 2014)
- Other political affiliations: Movement for Socialism (before 2014)
- Occupation: Organizer; politician

Freddy Germán Huayta Véliz (born 12 May 1968) is a Bolivian community organizer and politician who served as a party-list member of the Chamber of Deputies from Oruro from 2010 to 2015.

Huayta completed his early schooling in his home community and finished his studies as an adult later in life. After serving as a police officer throughout the 1990s, he retired to work in commerce and began leading and organizing grassroots movements in metropolitan Oruro's peri-urban outskirts. As the leader of his own neighborhood council, Huayta founded the Departmental Coordinator of Peri-urban Neighborhood Councils of Oruro, which he chaired as executive secretary from 2002 to 2010.

In 2005, Huayta was appointed deputy mayor of the Avaroa Canton and was later made departmental counselor to the Oruro prefecture from 2006 to 2008, demonstrating his and the neighborhood councils' close relations with the ruling Movement for Socialism. As a member of the party, he was elected to represent Oruro in the Chamber of Deputies in 2009. At the end of his term, Huayta amicably split with the ruling party and founded his own, Alternative Civic Integration, with which he unsuccessfully contested a seat on the Oruro Municipal Council in 2021.

== Early life and career ==
=== Early life and education ===
Freddy Huayta was born on 12 May 1968 in Estancia Jarenilla, a hamlet in the Sud Carangas Province of central Oruro, to Cristóbal Huayta Véliz and Virginia Véliz de Huayta. Raised in rural poverty, Huayta spent his early years accompanying the labors of his father, handling and herding livestock such as cattle and llamas. He completed his primary schooling at the Pedro Domingo Murillo and Túpac Katari schools in his home canton of Avaroa, later moving to adjacent Belén de Andamarca Canton to attend the Simón Bolívar School, at which point he halted his studies.

In 2001, Huayta graduated from the Center for Accelerated Secondary Education, a specialized institute focused on supporting adults whose academic development was disrupted during their youth. Huayta completed further professional courses in parliament and began undergoing a law degree at Cosmos Private Technical University in La Paz. The pursuit of adult education while in office was a common tendency among parliamentarians of rural backgrounds.

=== Career and community organizing ===
After completing his term of military service, Huayta settled in the city of Oruro, where he started a family and took on various of odd jobs. He played as an amateur musician in his early years before settling into a career as a police officer between 1991 and 1996. He later retired to work in commerce as a carrier, a job he also felt unfulfilled in. Starting in 1999, Huayta began actively participating in grassroots organizing; he developed an extensive career in associative and communal spaces, especially in the neighborhood councils encompassing the city's peri-urban areas. He established and led the New Horizon Neighborhood Council and was a founding member of the Departmental Coordinator of Peri-urban Neighborhood Councils of Oruro in 2002, which he chaired as executive secretary until 2010.

From 2004 to 2005, Huayta served as representative and spokesman in Oruro for the Coordinator for the Defense of Water, a Cochabamba-based entity organized to challenge water privatization and subsequent tariff hikes during the Cochabamba water conflict of 2000. That crisis, which popularized the utilization of "coordinators" – loose-knit entities composed of multiple organizations united around a single cause – marked an inflection point in Bolivian politics, highlighting the newfound power of organized social movements to make collective demands against the state.

A supporter of the water rights movement, Huayta began working to supply Oruro's impoverished outer neighborhoods with better water access in 2003. His efforts expanded in subsequent years to include other development projects, such as the provision of improved sewerage, added public lighting, and enhanced internet and natural gas access. In 2005, he founded the Multidisciplinary Social Communitarian Association of Integral Services – Oruro, an organization specifically dedicated to the provision of basic public services to the capital's often neglected urban sprawl.

== Chamber of Deputies ==
=== Election ===
Huayta's association with the Movement for Socialism (MAS-IPSP) dates to the mid-2000s, when the party's budding alliance with the neighborhood councils was still in its infancy. Following the 2004 municipal election, Huayta was appointed deputy mayor of his native Avaroa Canton, and when the MAS won control of the Oruro regional government, he was made departmental counselor to the prefecture from 2006 to 2008. By 2009, he was serving as a representative for the Ministry of Water to the Local Aqueduct and Sewerage Service of Oruro. That year, the MAS nominated him for a seat in the Chamber of Deputies; Huayta's top slot on the party's list of candidates boosted his odds of victory, even before the MAS won nearly every seat in Oruro's parliamentary delegation.

=== Tenure ===
In parliament, Huayta championed many of the same causes he had pursued as a community leader. He sponsored legislation for the development Oruro's economically disadvantaged neighborhoods and monitored ongoing public works projects in the region. By his own admission, the process was markedly different from his time leading Oruro's neighborhood councils: "Sometimes I think that it is better to be a sectoral leader than a [parliamentarian] because the leader has more power; behind him are the grassroots and that helps complete projects faster." Between 2013 and 2014, Huayta presided over Oruro's parliamentary delegation, allowing him to further prioritize his policy initiatives.

Huayta did not seek a second term chairing Oruro's delegation in 2014, but disagreed with discrepancies in the designation of his successor, Senator Ricardo Aillón – objections that culminated in his estrangement from the ruling party. In contrast to other MAS dissidents, Huayta's defection was comparatively less acrimonious. Although he stated his intent to operate independently for his tenure's duration, not taking part in party conferences and the like, he simultaneously rejected narratives implying a more concrete break in support for the government: "Until the last ... second that I am a deputy, I will be from the MAS. When this is over, I will properly thank President Evo Morales for the opportunity, and then [I] will continue [on my] political path."

=== Commission assignments ===
- Social Policy Commission
  - Habitat, Housing, and Social Services Committee (2010–2011)
- Rural Native Indigenous Peoples and Nations, Cultures, and Interculturality Commission
  - Rural Native Indigenous Peoples and Nations Committee (Secretary: 2011–2012)
- Amazon Region, Land, Territory, Water, Natural Resources, and Environment Commission
  - Amazon Region, Land, and Territory Committee (2012–2013)
- Territorial Organization of the State and Autonomies Commission
  - Rural Native Indigenous Autonomies Committee (2013–2015)

== Later political career ==
=== 2015 Oruro municipal election ===
Near the end of 2014, Huayta undertook the task of organizing his own party, Alternative Civic Integration – Socialist Front (INCA-FS), which branded itself as a left-wing second option to the preeminent MAS. After attaining legal recognition to contest local elections, Huayta communicated his intent to seek a seat on the Oruro Municipal Council – leading a strategy focused on maximizing local legislative representation above expending significant resources contesting the mayoralty. In late December, Huayta announced that Marcelo Medina would head the INCA-FS ticket but stated that he himself would not be running as a candidate after all. According to Huayta, the motive was to give new generations greater opportunity to participate in politics. At the same time, it can also be noted that Huayta was actually barred from running, as were most outgoing parliamentarians, owing to a controversial ruling by the Supreme Electoral Tribunal which established that incumbent legislators did not meet the necessary residency requirements to seek local public office.

Though INCA-FS did not win the Oruro mayoralty, its third-place finish did secure it two seats on the municipal council. However, the initial success was offset by the errant nature of the party's elected councillors, who were not cooperative or responsive to Huayta's leadership. Within days of assuming office, one councillor declared themself independent, and both allegedly backed the election of MAS legislator Henry Rojas to the presidency of the municipal council, prompting Huayta to denounce them as traitors and demand their resignations. Despite subsequent attempts to reconcile their differences, by mid-term, Huayta was reportedly in the process of seeking a recall election against at least one of the councillors.

=== 2021 Oruro municipal election ===
Entering the 2021 campaign season, Huayta's party recruited Miguel Salas as its mayoral candidate, replacing Medina, who had hitched his bets on a different front. For his part, no longer impeded from presenting his own candidacy, Huayta ran for a long-coveted seat on the Oruro Municipal Council. However, Salas unexpectedly withdrew his candidacy near the end of the campaign – an unsuccessful attempt to avoid splitting the vote in favor of the MAS. Despite Huayta's attempts to keep INCA-FS in the race, such efforts were not successful. Consequently, the party – whose ticket officially remained on the ballot – finished last on election day.

== Electoral history ==
Electoral history of Freddy Huayta
Year	Office	Party	Votes			Result	Ref.
Year	Office	Party	Total	%	P.	Result	Ref.
2009	Deputy	Movement for Socialism	178,363	79.46%	1st	Won	(Note: Presented on an electoral list. The data shown represents the share of the vote the entire party/alliance received in that constituency.)
2021	Councillor	Alternative Civic Integration	1,446	1.03%	14th	Lost	
Source: Plurinational Electoral Organ | Electoral Atlas

Chamber of Deputies of Bolivia
Preceded by Ricardo Aillón	Member of the Chamber of Deputies from Oruro; 2010–2015	Succeeded by Aniceto Choque
