= Land reform in Bolivia =

Before the Bolivian National Revolution of 1952, land in Bolivia was unequally distributed — 92% of the cultivable land was held by estates of 1,000 hectares or more.

On August 2, 1953, the MNR government led by president Víctor Paz Estenssoro decreed the Agrarian Reform Law (Law Decree 3464). The law abolished forced peasantry labor, and established a program of land reform to expropriate and distribute the rural property of the traditional landlords to the Indian peasants. Only estates with low productivity were completely distributed. More productive small and medium-sized farms were allowed to keep part of their land and were encouraged to invest new capital to increase agricultural production. The Agrarian Reform Law also provided for compensation for landlords to be paid in the form of twenty-five-year government bonds. The amount of compensation was based on the value of the property declared for taxes.

At first, the government was unable to control the occupation of land by the peasants. As a result, it could not enforce the provisions of the land reform decree to keep medium-sized productive estates intact. But the MNR eventually gained the support of the campesinos when the Ministry of Peasant Affairs was created and when peasants were organized into syndicates. Peasants were not only granted land but their militias also were given large supplies of arms. The peasants remained a powerful political force in Bolivia during all subsequent governments.

However, in 1970 only 45% of peasant families had received title to land, although more land reform projects continued in the 1970s and 1980s.

A 1996 Agrarian Reform Law (also Spanish: Ley INRA) increased protection for smallholdings and indigenous territories, but also protected absentee landholders who pay taxes from expropriation. Bolivian president Evo Morales restarted land reform when he took office in 2006.

On 29 November 2006, the Bolivian Senate passed a bill authorizing the government redistribution of land among the nation's mostly indigenous poor. The bill was signed into law hours later.
