= Adriana Gil =

Bolivian politician

Adriana Gil is a Bolivian political figure. She has been the party leader of Social Democratic Force (FSD), a movement which bills itself as a left-wing democratic alternative to the President Evo Morales's government.

Formerly an ally of Morales, Gil is widely credited with having garnered electoral support for him in the province of Santa Cruz, which is considered to be politically conservative. Gil broke with Morales in 2006 over several issues, including alleged corruption in the new government, its confiscatory policies, and the perception that Morales represents a trend towards an authoritarian ethnocentric order which is concerned solely about the interests of some of the indigenous Quechua and Aymara people.

Gil decries Morales, saying that Bolivians "voted for change, not for a dictator". In apparent retaliation for Gil's dissidence, Gil's farmland has undergone a process of seizure by Quechua squatters who hold permits for her land, signed by Rural Development Minister Hugo Salvatierra. Gil has accused Vice President Álvaro García Linera of leading a conspiracy to seize her land and others', a charge he has denied.

In 2008, Gil formed a new political party, Fuerza Demócrata (FD), with another former Morales supporter, Román Loayza. In mid-2009, Gil formed an alliance with Manfred Reyes Villa, a former mayor of Cochabamba. Reyes Villa was a losing candidate in Bolivia's 2009 presidential elections, having finished second behind President Evo Morales.
