= David Sánchez Heredia =

David Sánchez Heredia (born December 25, 1966) is a Bolivian politician with the Movement toward Socialism party, former university instructor and docent, and former business manager. He serves as one of four Senators from Chuquisaca Department, a post he was elected to in December 2009. Sánchez holds a bachelor's degree in economy and finance; has served as Docent in the Higher University of San Simón in Cochabamba and the University of Saint Francis Xavier in Sucre, and as Vice-Rector of the Andean University; and was a manager in several telecommunication firms.

Previously, he was Chuquisaca's first elected Prefect, a position he held from 23 January 2006 to 30 August 2007 and from 20 September 2007 to 18 December 2007. He won election as prefect on 18 December 2005 with 42% of the vote. His tenure was marked by confrontational protests by the Chuquisaca civic movement against the Constituent Assembly meeting in Chuquisaca's capital city of Sucre. Sánchez fled the city following the violent clashes on 22–24 November 2007, which left three civic movement protesters dead. Sánchez's home was burned and his van attacked on 24 November, but he escaped to La Paz, and later to exile in Peru, from where he resigned on 18 December.
