= Adolfo Mendoza =

Bolivian politician (born 1964)

Gonzalo Adolfo Mendoza Leigue (born March 18, 1964, in Cochabamba, Bolivia) is a Bolivian politician, sociologist, and university docent who served as a Senator in the Plurinational Legislative Assembly representing the department of Cochabamba.

Mendoza served as an advisor to the 2006–07 Constituent Assembly as it drafted a new constitution. He has also acted as researcher on that process and forms of autonomy. He served as advisor to the Pact of Unity social movement alliance between 2002 and 2010. He was elected as senator in the 2009 general elections, and took office in 2010.

In 2013, Mendoza took leadership of a parliamentary committee investigating the privatization of public companies under Bolivia's neoliberal governments.

In 2020, he was elected to represent Bolivia in the Andean Parliament where he was given the presidential chair for the period 2021–2022.
