= Jorge Choquetarqui =

Bolivian politician (born 1968)

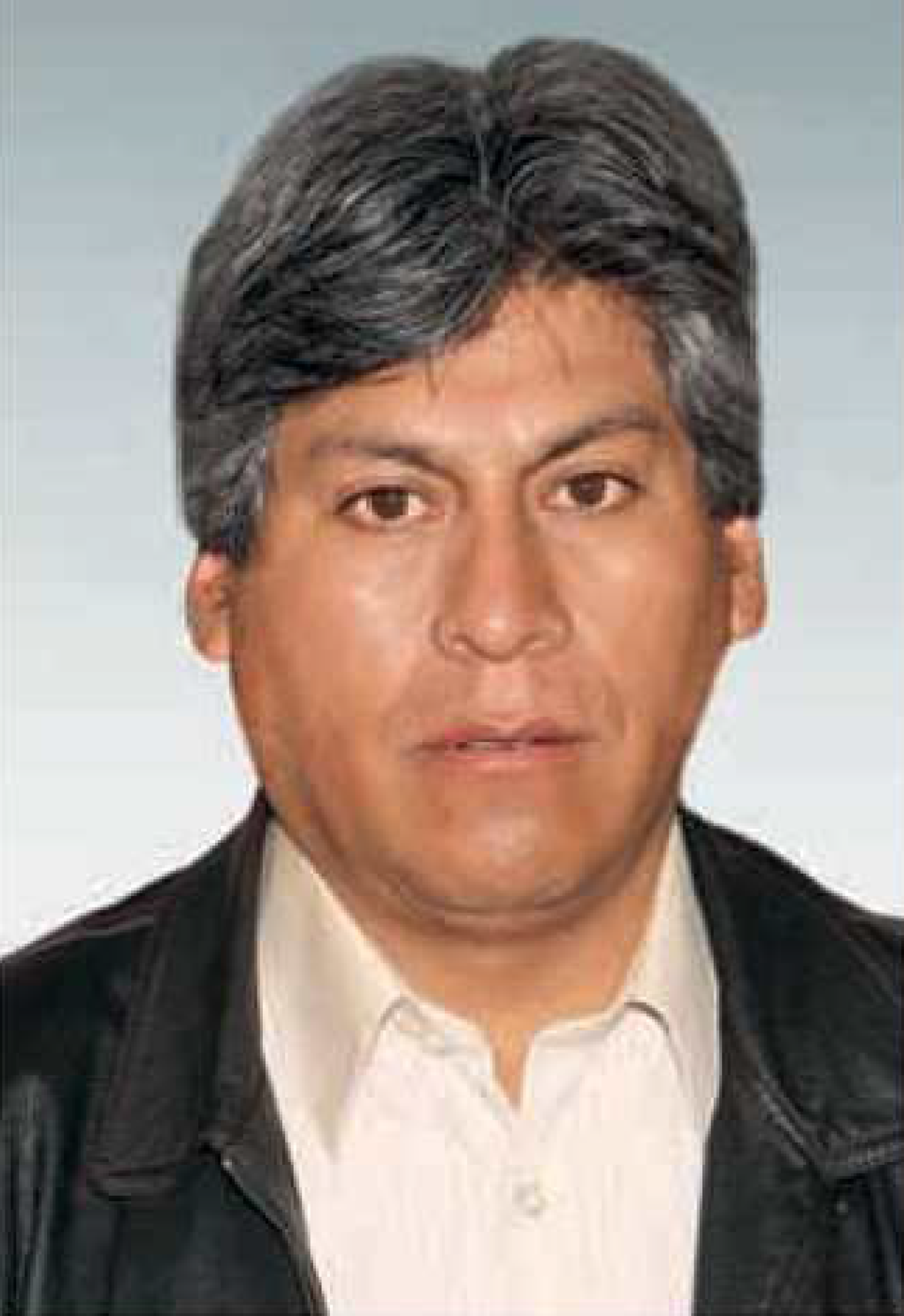
- Official portrait, 2014

Member of the Chamber of Deputies from La Paz
- In office 19 January 2010 – 18 January 2015
- Substitute: Paulina Rodríguez
- Preceded by: Gustavo Torrico
- Succeeded by: Franklin Durán
- Constituency: Party list

Personal details
- Born: Jorge Adalberto Choquetarqui Jahuircata; 24 April 1968 (age 58) El Alto, La Paz, Bolivia
- Party: Movement for Socialism
- Education: Higher University of San Andrés (no degree)
- Occupation: Organizer; politician

Jorge Adalberto Choquetarqui Jahuircata (born 23 April 1968) is a Bolivian community organizer and politician who served as a party-list member of the Chamber of Deputies from La Paz from 2010 to 2015.

Born and brought up in El Alto, Choquetarqui worked as a micro-business owner involved in several ventures, including textile manufacturing. He took an interest in the extensive network of community associations and organizations covering the city. He served on the neighborhood council of the 16 de Julio zone and assumed leadership positions on the school board at his primary school alma mater.

Elected president of the El Alto Parents' Federation in 2006, Choquetarqui led the organization through 2010. The sector's alignment with the government of Evo Morales cleared the path for his election to the Chamber of Deputies on the Movement for Socialism ticket in 2009. His organization's decision to put forward new representatives in 2014 meant he was not nominated for reelection.

== Early life and career ==
=== Early life and education ===
Jorge Choquetarqui was born on 24 April 1968 in El Alto, in what was then a main district of the city of La Paz. He was raised by his father in a single-parent household alongside three siblings; their mother died when Choquetarqui was 7 years old. He began living independently at around age 15.

Choquetarqui attended the Los Andes Educational Unit located two blocks from his home until fifth grade primary. He completed his upper primary and secondary education at the state school Juvenal Mariaca, where he received his baccalaureate in 1988. Although he initially pursued a degree in communication studies at the Higher University of San Andrés, lack of finances forced him to drop out after two years.

=== Career and community organizing ===
In the years after leaving university, Choquetarqui juggled several entrepreneurial ventures: he operated a small enterprise manufacturing local textiles, made a business purchasing and selling motorcycles, and provided share taxi services from two minibuses he owned.

Around this time, Choquetarqui became involved in his children's schooling due to deficiencies in the institutes they attended. His support for volunteer efforts led him to serve on the neighborhood council of the 16 de Julio zone of El Alto from 2001 to 2002, and he was elected to the school board (Note: In the case of Bolivia, a school board (Spanish: Junta escolar) is definitionally more akin to a parent-teacher association than a traditional board of education. They are composed of parents, teachers, and other community members and provide a platform for these groups to provide volunteer support and assist in the administration of their school.) of his alma mater, Los Andes, in 2003. Starting as general secretary, he later served as vice president and president of the body through to 2006.

In 2006, Choquetarqui was elected president of the El Alto Parents' Federation (FEDEPAF), the governing body representing the municipality's myriad school boards and parent-teacher associations. Reelected to a second two-year term in 2008, he was also made secretary of organizations on the National Parents' Board of Bolivia and served as the association's representative in El Alto.

Choquetarqui's tenure at the head of FEDEPAF maneuvered the organization through a complex web of ties with the government and other social movements. As with other associations, the relationship between FEDEPAF and the incumbent Evo Morales administration fluctuated on a dime between cooperation and antagonism, although the core state-union alliance prevailed in the long term. In a similar sense, FEDEPAF maintained a friend-foe accord with the nation's teachers' unions – allies around shared demands, adversaries during periods of prolonged strikes by education workers.

== Chamber of Deputies ==
=== Election ===
Choquetarqui won a seat in the Chamber of Deputies on the Movement for Socialism (MAS) party list in the 2009 election. In typical MAS fashion, the nomination owed not to his influence in the party but to his prominence within allied organizations. FEDEPAF, as a constituent member of the Regional Workers' Center of El Alto (COR), had selected Choquetarqui as part of the COR's quota of representatives on the MAS's parliamentary slate.

This delicate network of alliances between disparate – often conflicting – social movement organizations was a major factor in the MAS's rise to electoral dominance. This is exemplified by the election of Choquetarqui of the parents' associations on the same list as Gilda Oporto of the teachers' unions, despite recurrent quarrels between their respective sectors. (Note: Another example is the equal weight given to cooperative and salaried mineworkers on the MAS's slate of candidates, despite frequent – often bloody – confrontations between both groups.)

=== Tenure ===
Choquetarqui split his service in the Chamber of Deputies between two parliamentary committees: that of cultures from 2010 to 2013 and that of gender rights from 2013 to 2015. He led the MAS bench in La Paz from 2013 to 2014 and was president of the department's parliamentary delegation from 2014 to 2015. On the international stage, Choquetarqui was vice president for Bolivia at the Andean Parliament from 2011 to 2012.

At the end of his term, Choquetarqui was not put forward for reelection. The lack of permanence in office among MAS lawmakers became commonplace through successive cycles. Since the initial nomination had been the purview of the member's organization rather than the party, so too was the decision to re-nominate; in most cases, it was preferred instead to promote new leadership.

=== Commission assignments ===
- Rural Native Indigenous Peoples and Nations, Cultures, and Interculturality Commission
  - Cultures, Interculturality, and Cultural Heritage Committee (2010–2013)
- Human Rights Commission
  - Gender Rights Committee (2013–2015)

== Electoral history ==
Electoral history of Jorge Choquetarqui
Year	Office	Party	Votes			Result	Ref.
Year	Office	Party	Total	%	P.	Result	Ref.
2009	Deputy	Movement for Socialism	1,099,259	80.28%	1st	Won	(Note: Presented on an electoral list. The data shown represents the share of the vote the entire party/alliance received in that constituency.)
Source: Plurinational Electoral Organ | Electoral Atlas

Chamber of Deputies of Bolivia
Preceded by Gustavo Torrico	Member of the Chamber of Deputies from La Paz; 2010–2015	Succeeded by Franklin Durán
