= Nelly Núñez =

Bolivian politician (1948–2021)

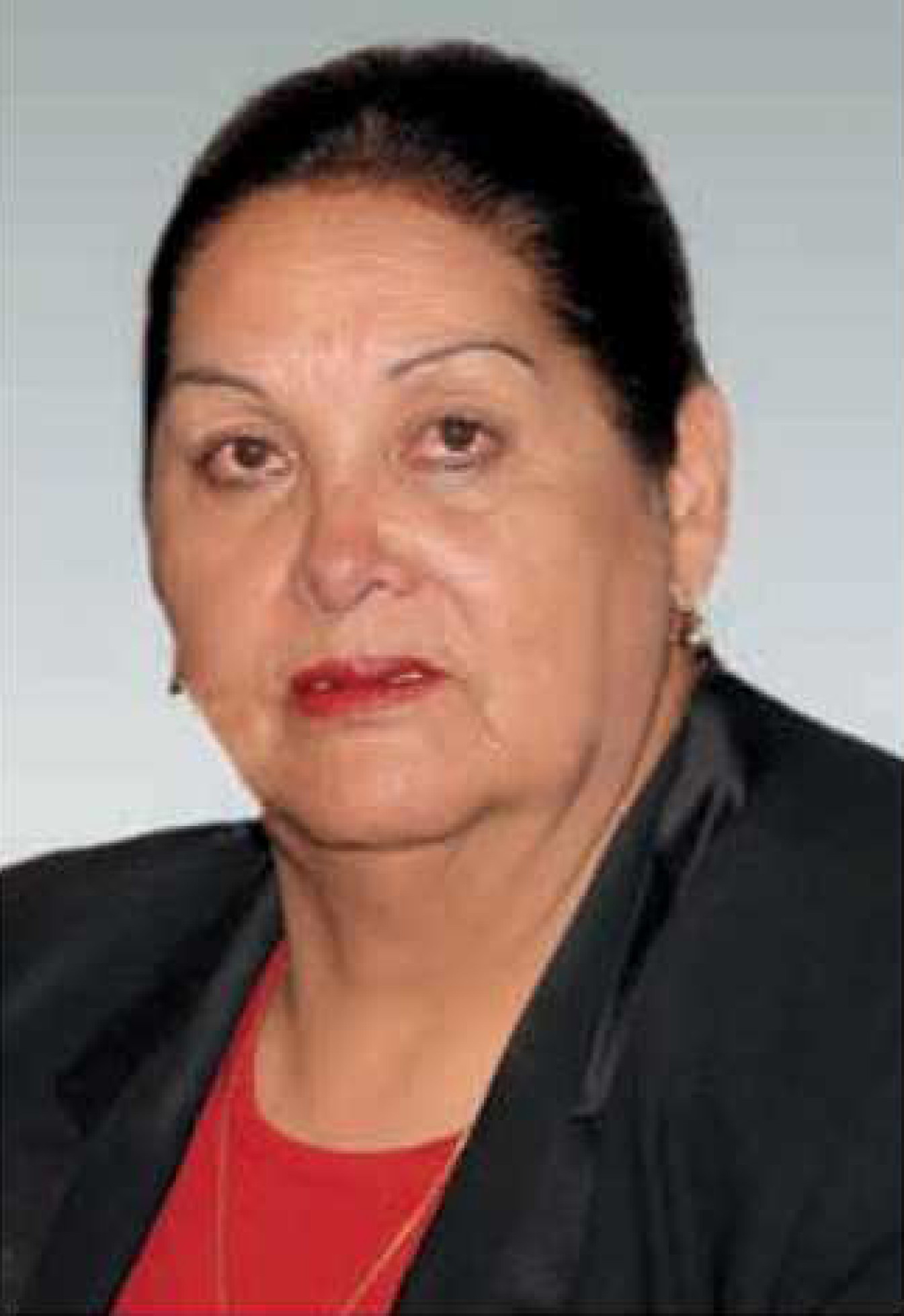
- Official portrait, 2014

Member of the Chamber of Deputies from Oruro circumscription 32
- In office 19 January 2010 – 18 January 2015
- Substitute: Benjamín Flores
- Preceded by: Lizandro García
- Succeeded by: Gonzalo Aguilar (Note: Redistribution; circumscription 29.)
- Constituency: Oruro

Personal details
- Born: Nelly Núñez Zegarra; 16 November 1948 Pulacayo, Potosí, Bolivia
- Died: 10 May 2021 (aged 72) Oruro, Bolivia
- Party: Movement for Socialism (2003–2021)
- Other political affiliations: Conscience of Fatherland (until 2002)
- Occupation: Nurse; politician

Nelly Núñez Zegarra (16 November 1948 – 10 May 2021) was a Bolivian nurse and politician who served as a member of the Chamber of Deputies from Oruro, representing circumscription 32 from 2010 to 2015.

Núñez emigrated from her hometown of Pulacayo, Potosí, to metropolitan Oruro when she was still an infant. She worked for a short while as a nurse at the city's general hospital but stepped aside to allow her husband to become the sole breadwinner, while she raised their children as a housewife.

Entering politics later in life, Núñez integrated the ranks of Conscience of Fatherland and held control of the party's affiliate branch in Oruro. She suffered two defeats in her efforts to enter parliament until the party's dissolution led her to seek out a new front. Núñez joined the Movement for Socialism in 2003 and was elected to the Chamber of Deputies representing the party in 2009. She was not nominated for reelection.

== Early life and career ==
=== Background and early life ===
Nelly Núñez was born on 16 November 1948 in Pulacayo, a mining settlement in the Uyuni Municipality of rural Potosí Department. She was the penultimate of four children – one boy and three girls – born to José Félix Núñez Navarro, a mineworker, and Benita Zegarra Rocha, a homemaker and weaver.

Due to her father's vocation – he was chief of welfare for the mineworkers – Núñez's family were stationed at various mining sites in different regions of the country. They settled permanently in Oruro when Núñez was 2 years old, where she was brought up and educated.

=== Family and career ===
Núñez worked as a nurse at the General Hospital of Oruro but retired to become a housewife upon marrying her husband, a gynecologist. She had her first of three children shortly thereafter and relocated to Sucre to provide for their education – though she maintained a weekly presence in her home region, where her husband remained as a mine doctor.

With her children grown and in university, Núñez returned to Oruro, where she began engaging in local associative and political spaces. Together with her daughter, she served on the directorate of the Caporales Cultural and Folkloric Fraternity, a Cochabamba-based caporales troupe composed of students from Oruro at the Higher University of San Simón.

== Chamber of Deputies ==
=== Election ===
In politics, Núñez initially aligned with Conscience of Fatherland (CONDEPA) during a period of factional infighting within the populist party. She stood as a candidate for Chamber of Deputies in 1997 but ranked too low on the CONDEPA party list to secure a seat. Come 2002, Núñez had been named departmental leader of CONDEPA in Oruro and occupied the top party-list slot in that year's general election. By then, however, the party's open schism had diminished its electoral prospects. In Oruro, CONDEPA fell from second place the previous cycle to dead last – part of a nationwide underperformance that led to the loss of its legal recognition.

The implosion of CONDEPA fueled the rapid rise of another anti-establishment party, the Movement for Socialism (MAS), which absorbed a significant portion of the defunct party's electorate. Many orphaned CONDEPA leaders took up new posts within the MAS, including Núñez, who joined the party in June 2003. She held local leadership roles in the MAS through its rise to government and into 2009, when she was nominated to contest single-member circumscription 32 in the Chamber of Deputies, encompassing parts of Oruro Municipality. She won the constituency with ease, flipping the seat in favor of the ruling party.

=== Tenure ===
In office, Núñez's legislative priorities centered on criminal justice reform and judicial reform. The plight of Bolivia's incarcerated population was especially prominent on her agenda. Most of the country's inmates lack a criminal conviction, and of those who receive and complete their sentence, many – Núñez noted – are not released until much later. Núñez served as chair of the Human Rights Committee from 2010 to 2011 and was part of Bolivia's delegation to the Latin American Parliament, where she lobbied for the improvement of living conditions for inmates in member states' prison facilities. As two-term chair of the Ordinary Jurisdiction Committee, Núñez was a principal architect of Bolivia's reformulated civil procedure code. Enacted in 2013, the legislation introduced some 500 articles intended to optimize the judicial system with the ultimate goal of minimizing the length of civil litigation to a one-year maximum.

In the ensuing years, Núñez assumed positions of leadership within her parliamentary group, starting as deputy leader of the MAS caucus in Oruro. Having been considered for the post in 2013, she was elected leader in 2014 – an influential position, considering the party's domination of the department's delegation. At the same time, Núñez's selection faced discontent from a segment of her caucus, with subsequent allegations of influence peddling on behalf of her daughter leading several colleagues – including her substitute, Benjamín Flores – to file a complaint against her with the Prosecutor's Office. Núñez, for her part, denied the allegations as a "political show". She was not nominated for reelection at the end of her term.

=== Commission assignments ===
- Human Rights Commission
  - Human Rights and Equal Opportunities Committee (Secretary: 2010–2011)
- Social Policy Commission
  - Social Welfare and Protection Committee (2011–2012)
- Plural Justice, Prosecutor's Office, and Legal Defense of the State Commission
  - Ordinary Jurisdiction and Magistracy Council Committee (Secretary: 2012–2014)
- International Relations and Migrant Protection Commission
  - International Economic Relations Committee (2014–2015)

== Personal life and death ==
Núñez married Fernando Ramos Zabalaga at age 22. The couple had three children: Carola Nashira, a lawyer; José María, an architect; and Osmar Fernando, a commercial engineer. Núñez died some years after leaving office in her home city of Oruro, on 10 May 2021, aged 72.

== Electoral history ==
Electoral history of Nelly Núñez
Year	Office	Party	Votes			Result	Ref.
Year	Office	Party	Total	%	P.	Result	Ref.
1997	Deputy	Conscience of Fatherland	24,596	20.87%	2nd	Lost	(Note: Presented on an electoral list. The data shown represents the share of the vote the entire party/alliance received in that constituency.)
2002	Deputy	Conscience of Fatherland	606	0.42%	11th	Lost	
2009	Deputy	Movement for Socialism	22,692	55.98%	1st	Won	
Source: Plurinational Electoral Organ | Electoral Atlas

Chamber of Deputies of Bolivia
Preceded by Lizandro García	Member of the Chamber of Deputies from Oruro circumscription 32; 2010–2015	Succeeded by Gonzalo Aguilar
