= Jaime Medrano =

Bolivian politician (born 1977)

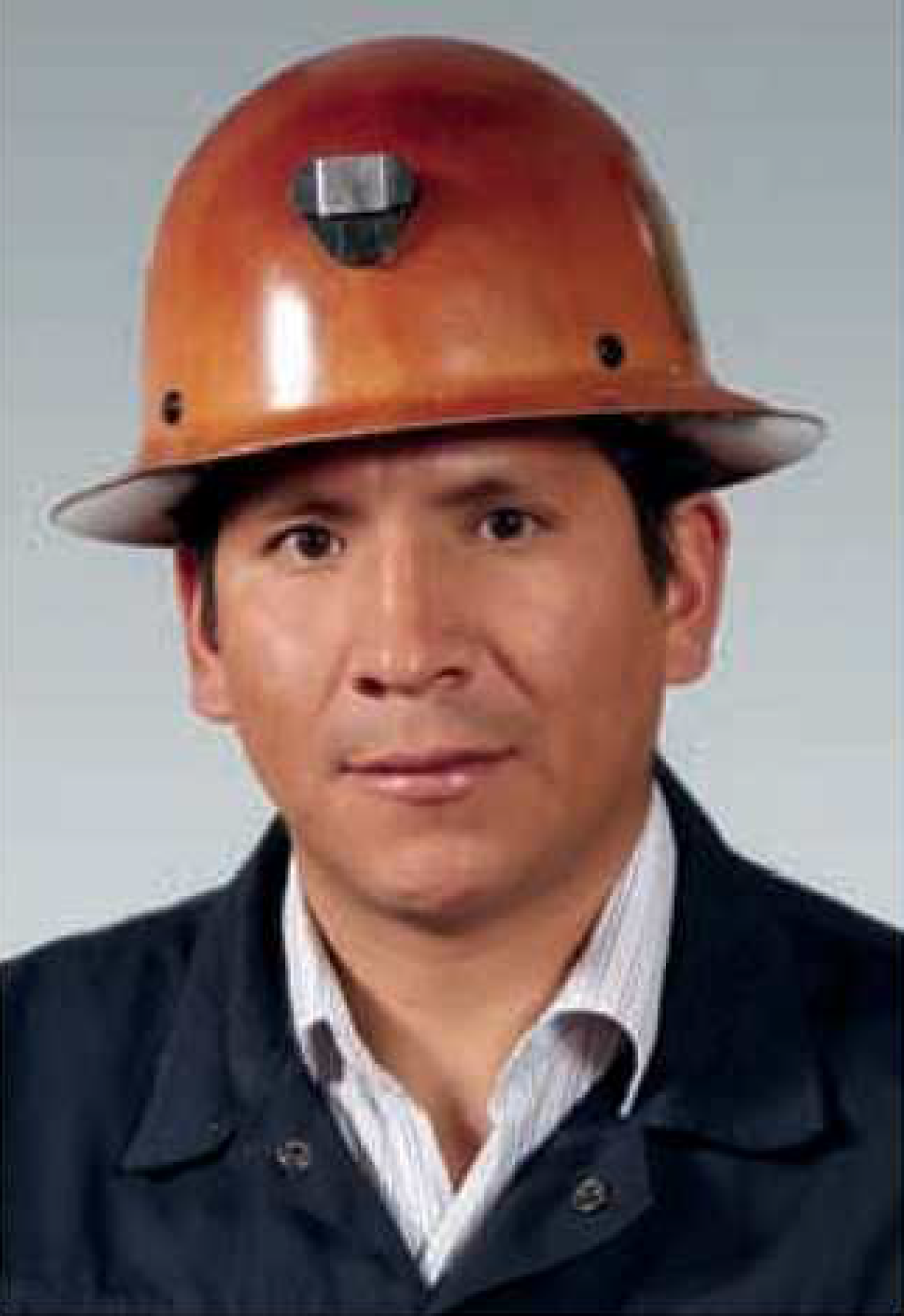
- Official portrait, 2014

Member of the Chamber of Deputies; from Oruro circumscription 36
- In office 19 January 2010 – 18 January 2015
- Substitute: Guillermina Astete
- Preceded by: Heriberto Lázaro
- Succeeded by: Eleuterio Huallpa (Note: Redistribution; circumscription 31.)
- Constituency: Abaroa; Dalence; Pagador; Poopó

Personal details
- Born: Jaime Medrano Veizaga; 21 October 1971 (age 54) Catavi, Potosí, Bolivia
- Party: Movement for Socialism
- Occupation: Mineworker; politician

Jaime Medrano Veizaga (born 21 October 1971) is a Bolivian mineworker and politician who served as a member of the Chamber of Deputies from Oruro, representing circumscription 36 from 2010 to 2015. Born to a mining family from Catavi, Medrano spent much of his life in Huanuni, site of one of the largest tin mines in the country. He spent much of his career as a company worker for the Huanuni Mining Corporation, serving as a sectional leader and as the mine's industrial safety inspector. In the alliance between the mining sector and the Movement for Socialism, Medrano broadly represented all of Huanuni's mineworkers in the Legislative Assembly, though he was primarily affiliated with the area's minority salaried company workers, noted for their frequent conflicts with the much larger group of cooperative workers over control of the most productive repositories.

== Early life and career ==
Jaime Medrano was born on 21 October 1971 in Catavi, Potosí, the fourth of seven siblings, including three paternal half-siblings. In his infancy, Medrano's family moved to Huanuni, a small mining community in the rural foothills of Oruro and site to one of the country's primary tin mines, where his father was employed as a mineworker. Medrano completed primary studies at the Franz Tamayo School, later attending the Guido Villagómez and Bolivia schools, though he ultimately never completed secondary education. Following the death of his father, Medrano and his family moved to Cochabamba, where he fulfilled his term of mandatory military service.

Starting in 1997, Medrano returned to Oruro as a temporary worker for the Huanuni Mining Corporation. He entered a salaried contract three years later and, after completing courses in industrial safety and environmental protection, was promoted to industrial safety inspector, the highest position most regular workmen could attain. Medrano held the post between 2005 and 2006, a period coinciding with the start of the first Evo Morales administration, whose government, from its inception, aligned itself with the mining sector. Though this fact generated support for Morales from among Huanuni's cooperative and salaried workers alike, (Note: Mineworkers in Huanuni are classified into two main groups: roughly 800 salaried or "regular" union workers contracted by the Huanuni Mining Corporation and approximately 4,000 cooperative workers holding membership in one of four primary cooperatives.) the latter group consistently criticized the government for its preferential treatment of cooperative miners. For Medrano—a salaried worker—bad blood with the increasingly assertive cooperativists resulted in his suspension from his position, relegated to lower-level mining work in his unit. As the animosity between the two groups worsened, he even suffered a beating from cooperative miners at one point. The eventual armed conflict between cooperativist and salaried miners "marked [Medrano's] life" and realigned the government in favor of company workers.

== Chamber of Deputies ==
=== Election ===
In the ensuing years, Medrano continued as a sectional leader in the Huanuni mines, serving as a delegate for one of the company's thirty-two sectors. As part of the Morales government's alignment with the mining sector, his party, the Movement for Socialism (MAS-IPSP), left ample autonomy for local trade unions to select their own congressional representatives. For the 2009 general election, the Huanuni mineworkers chose Medrano to represent them in the Chamber of Deputies. Despite admittedly having "no knowledge of politics," Medrano accepted his colleague's decision, competing uncontested in a district highly electorally favorable for the ruling party.

=== Tenure ===
Throughout all five years of his term, Medrano served as a member of the Mining and Metallurgy Committee, leading the body as its secretary in his final year. As head of the committee, Medrano oversaw the process of amending, revising, and ultimately passing a new mining law that expanded the government's control over the industry. Though originally drafted with input from representatives of all three mining sectors—cooperative, private, and state—the law was later opposed by cooperativists, who protested the omission of an article granting them the right to freely associate and sign contracts with local or foreign private companies. Medrano argued that the provision had been removed because it was in violation of the Constitution, which states that only the government may sign contracts with mining operators.

Upon the conclusion of his term, Medrano was not nominated for reelection, a common practice among the Movement for Socialism, which preferred to open up spaces for different representatives of allied sectors to enter parliament. Though Medrano's political career ended there, the salaried mineworkers he represented—as well as their cooperative counterparts—maintained their presence in the legislature, part of the ruling party's efforts to make space for both groups on its parliamentary lists.

== Electoral history ==
Electoral history of Jaime Medrano
Year	Office	Party	Votes			Result	Ref.
Year	Office	Party	Total	%	P.	Result	Ref.
2009	Deputy	Movement for Socialism	23,021	86.22%	1st	Won	
Source: Plurinational Electoral Organ | Electoral Atlas

Chamber of Deputies of Bolivia
Preceded by Heriberto Lázaro	Member of the Chamber of Deputies from Oruro circumscription 36; 2010–2015	Succeeded by Eleuterio Huallpa
