= Mireya Montaño =

Bolivian politician (born 1978)

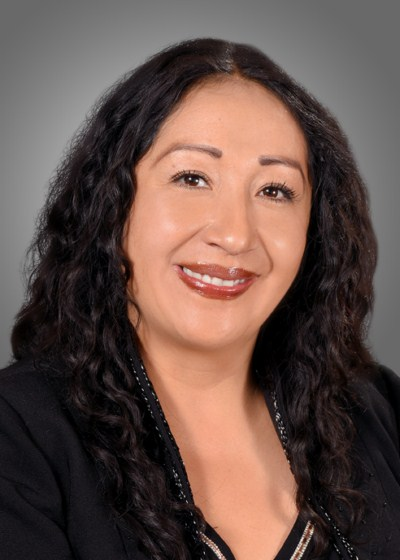
- Official portrait, 2017

Member of the Chamber of Deputies from La Paz circumscription 11
- In office 18 January 2015 – 3 November 2020
- Substitute: Humberto Alanez
- Preceded by: Lucio Marca (Note: Redistribution; circumscription 14.)
- Succeeded by: Renán Cabezas
- Constituency: El Alto

Substitute Member of the Chamber of Deputies from La Paz circumscription 14
- In office 25 January 2010 – 14 July 2014
- Deputy: Lucio Marca
- Preceded by: María del Carmen Miranda
- Succeeded by: Humberto Alanez (Note: Redistribution; circumscription 11.)
- Constituency: El Alto

Personal details
- Born: Carol Mireya Montaño Rocha; 26 November 1978 (age 47) La Paz, Bolivia
- Party: Movement for Socialism
- Education: Central University
- Occupation: Lawyer; politician; trade unionist

Carol Mireya Montaño Rocha (born 26 November 1978) is a Bolivian lawyer, politician, and trade unionist who served as a member of the Chamber of Deputies from La Paz, representing circumscription 11 from 2015 to 2020. A member of the Movement for Socialism, Montaño entered politics as head of the party's youth wing in El Alto, later serving as secretary of organization of the Federation of Neighborhood Councils. Her party's alliance with El Alto's neighborhood councils facilitated Montaño's entry into the Chamber of Deputies. In 2009, she was elected as a substitute deputy representing La Paz's circumscription 14 and in 2014, she became one of the few ruling party parliamentarians to be presented for reelection, this time for a full seat.

== Early life and career ==
Mireya Montaño was born on 26 November 1978 in La Paz. She studied law and political science at Central University, a private institute in the city, graduating with a master's in constitutional law and a postgraduate in conflict resolution. An early adherent of the Movement for Socialism (MAS-IPSP), Montaño entered political activity as head of the party's youth wing in El Alto. In 2006, she joined the Federation of Neighborhood Councils (FEJUVE), serving as the body's secretary of organization, charged with managing policies related to social control. Montaño's presence in both organizations represented the solid alliance the MAS had formed with the neighborhood councils, which from 2005 on, constituted one of the party's main operating arms in lower-class urban areas, playing an important role in organizing and mobilizing social sectors.

== Chamber of Deputies ==
=== Elections ===
In the electoral arena, the alliance between the MAS and regional neighborhood councils manifested itself in the nomination of the sector's leaders for parliamentary positions, both on the party's electoral lists and in single-member constituencies. The latter was the case for Montaño, who in 2009 was elected to the Chamber of Deputies in representation of El Alto's circumscription 14. She served as a substitute under Lucio Marca, himself a deputy with origins in El Alto's neighborhood councils.

Nearing the conclusion of her term, Montaño was presented for reelection to a full seat, an atypical occurrence within the MAS, which rarely offered its parliamentarians the opportunity to run twice in a row, preferring to open up spaces for different representatives of allied sectors to enter the legislature. She was elected to represent circumscription 11 of El Alto, the district with the largest number of registered voters in the country.

=== Tenure ===
Despite representing such a relatively high quantity of constituents and serving as leader of the MAS's La Paz delegation, Montaño's parliamentary term kept a notably low profile, characterized by El Alteño as "working in silence." Her lack of public visibility was a situation typified by most of El Alto's elected representatives. It motivated leaders of FEJUVE to reevaluate which individuals they would nominate to represent them as MAS candidates in future elections. As such, neither Montaño nor any of El Alto's parliamentarians were presented for reelection, be it in 2019 or 2020.

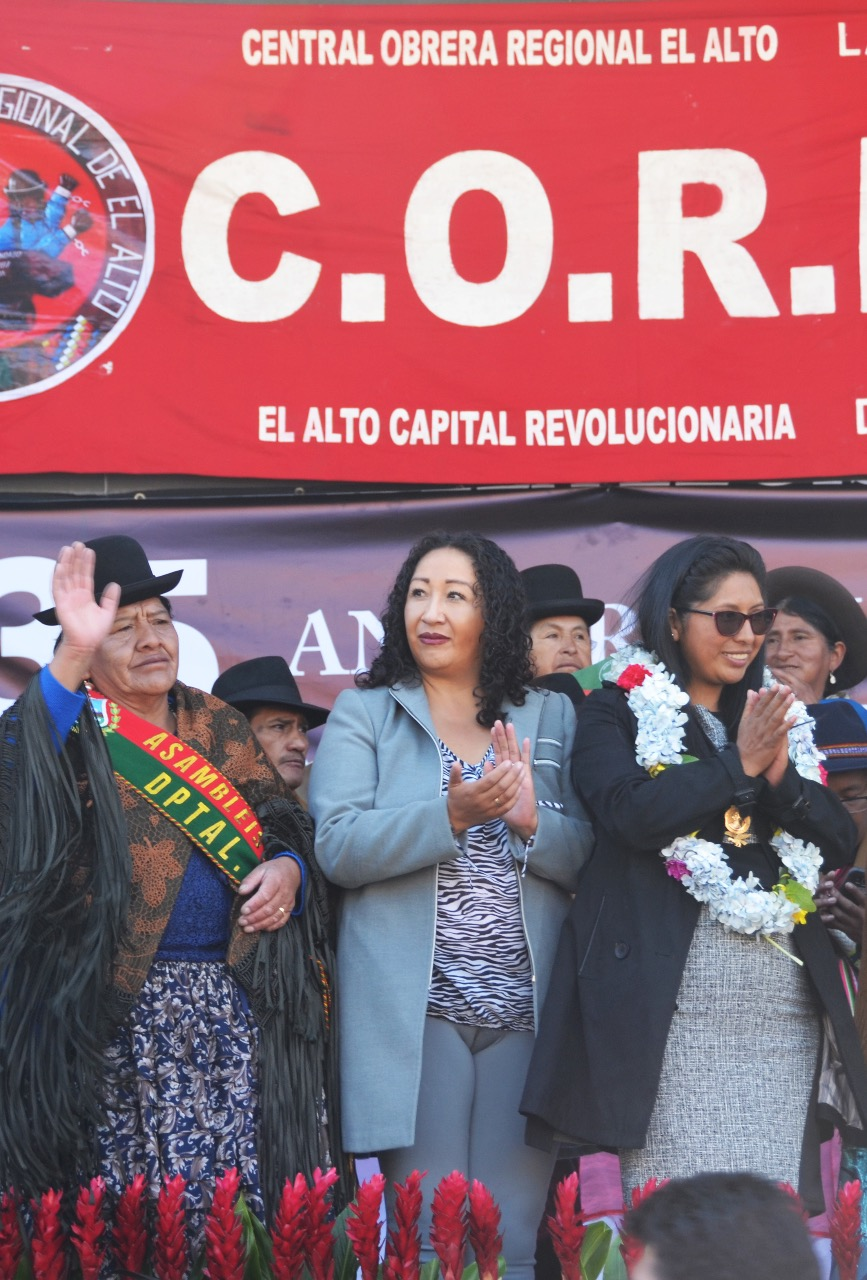
Next to Senator Eva Copa (right) at an event commemorating El Alto.

=== Commission assignments ===
- Constitution, Legislation, and Electoral System Commission (2011–2012; President: 2018–2019)
- Plural Justice, Prosecutor's Office, and Legal Defense of the State Commission
  - Ordinary Jurisdiction and Magistracy Council Committee (2014; Secretary: 2015–2016)
  - Prosecutor's Office and Legal Defense of the State Committee (2016–2017; Secretary: 2019–2020)
- Human Rights Commission (2012–2013; President: 2017–2018)
- Government, Defense, and Armed Forces Commission (2010–2011)

== Electoral history ==
Electoral history of Mireya Montaño
Year	Office	Party	Votes			Result	Ref.
Year	Office	Party	Total	%	P.	Result	Ref.
2009	Sub. Deputy	Movement for Socialism	39,204	69.79%	1st	Won	
2014	Deputy	Movement for Socialism	73,846	54.66%	1st	Won	
Source: Plurinational Electoral Organ | Electoral Atlas

Chamber of Deputies of Bolivia
Preceded by María del Carmen Miranda	Substitute Member of the Chamber of Deputies from La Paz circumscription 14; 2010–2014	Succeeded by Humberto Alanez
Preceded by Lucio Marca	Member of the Chamber of Deputies from La Paz circumscription 11; 2015–2020	Succeeded by Renán Cabezas
