= Bienvenido Zacu =

Guarayo politician

Bienvenido Zacu Mborobainchi (born March 22, 1956, Urubichá, Ñuflo de Chávez Province) is a Bolivian politician from the Guarayo people. His grandfather had been a Guarayo leader.

Zacu Mborobainchi grew up in Urubichá. He went to village school for three years. In 1976 he did his military service in the Ranger Manchego Regiment. In 1987 was elected as the president of the Urubichá Community Centre. Between 1989 and 1991 he served as the president of the communal organization of the Guarayo people, COPNAG.

In 1994 he took part in the organizing committee of the Ethnic Coordination of Santa Cruz. Between 1995 and 1998 he served as president of the Coordination of Ethnic Peoples of Santa Cruz (CPESC). Between 1998 and 2002 he was the 'Land and Territory' Secretary of CIDOB. In 2002, Zacu Mborobainchi led the 'March for Popular Sovereignty, Territory and Natural Resources', a protest march by foot that went from Santa Cruz de la Sierra to La Paz. The March resulted in an accord with the government and political parties on constitutional reform which enabled the formation of the Constituent Assembly.

In 2003 he served as vice president of CPESC. In 2004 he was appointed General Director of the Plain Areas of the Ministry for Indigenous Affairs.

In March 2006, Zacu Mborobainchi was appointed the General Director for Tierras Comunitarias de Origen at the Deputy Ministry for Lands. Zacu Mborobainchi was elected (as a MAS candidate) to the Plurinational Legislative Assembly in 2009, as the deputy from the special peasant indigenous constituency of the Santa Cruz Department. His alternate is Teresa Nomine Chiqueno. In the parliament, Zacu Mborobainchi is the president of the Indigenous Peasants Nations' and People's Commission of the lower chamber.
