= Osney Martínez =

Bolivian politician (born 1961)

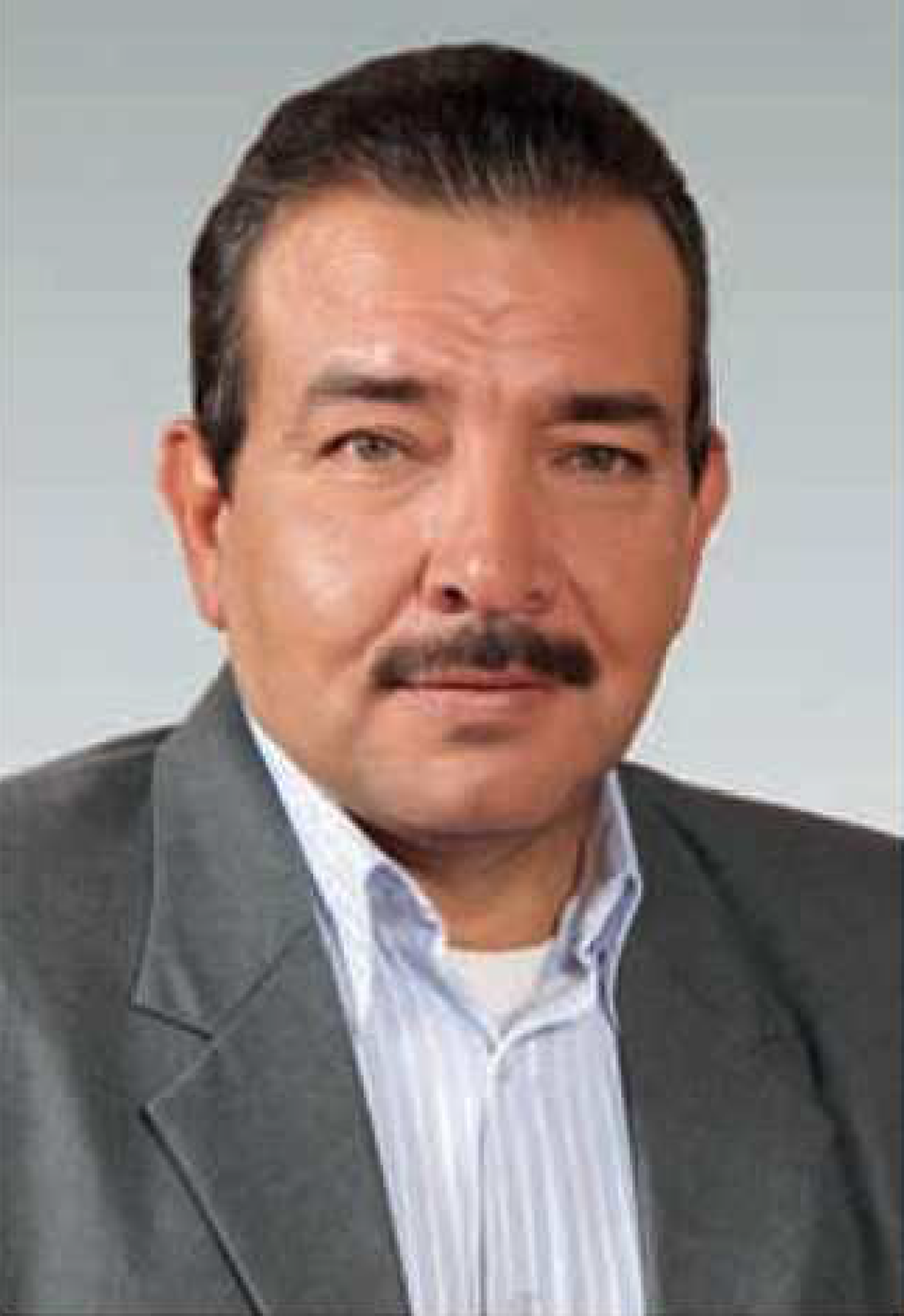
- Official portrait, 2014

Member of the Chamber of Deputies from Beni
- In office 10 February 2010 – 18 January 2015
- Substitute: Yaqueline Yáñez
- Preceded by: Jorge Soruco
- Succeeded by: Margarita Fernández
- Constituency: Party list

Personal details
- Born: Osney Martínez Daguer; 15 December 1961 (age 64) San Borja, Beni, Bolivia
- Party: Revolutionary Nationalist Movement (before 2004; c. 2014–present); Nationalist Democratic Action (2004–2009)
- Education: University of Washington; Federal Rural University of Rio de Janeiro
- Occupation: Agronomist; politician; rancher

Osney Martínez Daguer (born 15 December 1961) is a Bolivian agronomist, politician, and rancher who served as a party-list member of the Chamber of Deputies from Beni from 2010 to 2015. Born to a wealthy family from San Borja with political links to the Revolutionary Nationalist Movement, Martínez spent most of his career in local administration, starting as a substitute member of the city's municipal council before being twice elected to a full seat on the body.

In 2009, Martínez was elected to represent Beni in the Chamber of Deputies on behalf of the National Convergence alliance. Elected in 2011 to lead the fractured opposition caucus, he sought to create a working relationship with the ruling Movement for Socialism but was hampered by internal rebellions within his own bloc, a fact that led to his ouster as leader the following year. Alienated from political leaders, he was not nominated for reelection and retired to his ranch at the end of his term.

== Early life and career ==
Osney Martínez was born on 15 December 1961 to Arnulfo Martínez Durán and Celia Daguer Barba, a wealthy family of ranchers native to San Borja, Beni. Martínez's parents held longstanding political links to the Revolutionary Nationalist Movement (MNR), his father having been an active participant in the National Revolution of 1952, while his mother—a second-generation Arab immigrant—served as mayor of San Borja. In their later years, Arnulfo Martínez went on to become a founding member of the Federation of Ranchers of Beni, while Celia Daguer managed a local charity supporting children with disabilities.

From age 7, Martínez was sent to attend a German boarding school in Sucre, where he remained for two years. He continued his education in La Paz at the city's German international school before being transferred to the nearby Don Bosco School, finally completing his studies at institutions in Santa Cruz de la Sierra and Puerto Suárez. In 1981, Martínez traveled to the United States to study English, completing two semesters at George Washington University in Washington, D.C. Over the next four years, Martínez studied agricultural engineering at the Federal Rural University of Rio de Janeiro, though he ultimately decided to return to Bolivia before completing his degree.

== Early political career ==
Returning to San Borja, Martínez briefly dedicated himself to ranching before taking his first steps into politics. He joined the MNR and was elected to lead one of the party's branches in San Borja. Martínez made his electoral debut in the 1995 municipal elections when he won a seat on the San Borja Municipal Council as a substitute councillor. The following cycle, he sought the mayoralty but landed in second place, alleging demographic manipulation through the importation of voters from La Paz. Though he failed to reach the top municipal position, Martínez did conserve his seat on the municipal council, which he chaired as the body's president for the duration of his term.

With the decline of the MNR as a political force in the wake of the collapse of Gonzalo Sánchez de Lozada's government, Martínez distanced himself from the party. For his second reelection bid, Martínez opted to form his own group, the Borjan Alliance; however, its lack of legal status led him to align with Nationalist Democratic Action (ADN), with which he won reelection.

== Chamber of Deputies ==
=== Election ===
Martínez limited himself to local politics until 2009 when he was invited to seek a seat in the Chamber of Deputies on the slate of candidates presented by National Convergence (CN), a haphazard electoral alliance that incorporated many of the old party structures of ADN and the MNR. He won the seat and entered the lower chamber.

=== Tenure ===
No sooner was Martínez sworn into office than CN fractured as a grouping, owing to its circumstantial formation and the flight of its primary political leaders from the country. In this context, it was Martínez who, in his second year, was selected to lead this largely individualistic caucus in the lower chamber. As head of CN, Martínez sought to establish a "proactive opposition" within the legislature, attempting to build bridges and cooperate where he could with the ruling Movement for Socialism (MAS-IPSP), a strategy that was successful inasmuch as it further divided the alliance, accused by dissident factions of being "functional" to the government. Nonetheless, in 2012, Martínez sought a second term as caucus leader. Despite initially declaring victory—counting forty-eight votes in his favor—Martínez's legitimacy was challenged by competing factions, with many CN deputies later withdrawing their support in favor of Luis Felipe Dorado, who was ultimately recognized by the broader chamber as CN's next head.

Upon the conclusion of his term, Martínez failed to locate a front willing to postulate him for reelection. He and some other colleagues attributed this to the MAS, alleging that the ruling party had been "manag[ing] the lists" of its electoral opponents by vetoing certain parliamentarians from appearing on them. Both the MAS and the opposition Democratic Unity coalition denied these accusations, and neither Martínez nor his colleagues presented any evidence to back their claims.

=== Commission assignments ===
- Rural Native Indigenous Peoples and Nations, Cultures, and Interculturality Commission
  - Rural Native Indigenous Peoples and Nations Committee (2012–2015)
  - Coca Leaf Committee (2010–2011)
- Government, Defense, and Armed Forces Commission
  - Public Security Committee (2011–2012)

== Later life ==
Following the end of his term, Martínez retired to his residence in San Borja, where he once again took up ranching and worked to promote rapprochement between the many opposition groups that found themselves at odds following the victory of the MAS in the 2014 elections. Martínez re-approached the MNR and was reincorporated into its ranks, supporting the 2015 gubernatorial bid of former senator Sandro Giordano, who unsuccessfully sought to project a winning candidacy in one of the party's last vestiges of support.

Martínez's brother, Arnulfo, took a far different political path, joining the MAS, with which he was elected corregidor of San Borja and later sub-governor of Ballivián Province in 2015 and 2021, respectively.

== Electoral history ==
Electoral history of Osney Martínez
Year	Office	Party	Alliance	Votes			Result	Ref.
Year	Office	Party	Alliance	Total	%	P.	Result	Ref.
1995	Sub. Councillor	Revolutionary Nationalist Movement	None	2,564	42.16%	2nd	Won	(Note: Presented on an electoral list. The data shown represents the share of the vote the entire party/alliance received in that constituency.)
1999	Mayor (Note: Per Article 3 Section VI of the 1967 Constitution with amendments from 1995, individuals who appear at the top of a party's electoral list of councillors are also that party's candidate for mayor.)	Revolutionary Nationalist Movement	None	2,910	41.55%	2nd	Partial	
2004	Councillor	Borjan Alliance	Nationalist Democratic Action	2,740	32.67%	1st	Won	
2009	Deputy	Independent	National Convergence	85,631	53.15%	1st	Won	
Source: Plurinational Electoral Organ | Electoral Atlas

Chamber of Deputies of Bolivia
Preceded by Jorge Soruco	Member of the Chamber of Deputies from Beni; 2010–2015	Succeeded by Margarita Fernández
Preceded by Mauricio Muñoz	Leader of the Chamber of Deputies; National Convergence Caucus; 2011–2012	Succeeded by Luis Felipe Dorado
