= Vigilance committee (trade union) =

A vigilance committee is an unofficial grouping within a trade union, formed for the purpose of putting pressure on that union's leadership to pursue alternative policies or to pursue existing policies with increased vigour. Vigilance committees are usually formed when large numbers of union members disagree with the union's official policy, believe that they cannot trust the leadership to protect their interests properly, or that it is necessary for union members to scrutinise the actions of the leadership. In the United Kingdom, vigilance committees were widespread during the 1920s, appearing, for example, amongst seamen, dockers and railwaymen. These vigilance committees were influenced by communist militants of the National Minority Movement. Vigilance committees were also common in 1940s or 1950s, although by this stage most such bodies did not use the term vigilance committee, preferring alternate terms such as Reform Movement.
