= Severo Aguilar =

Bolivian politician (born 1975)

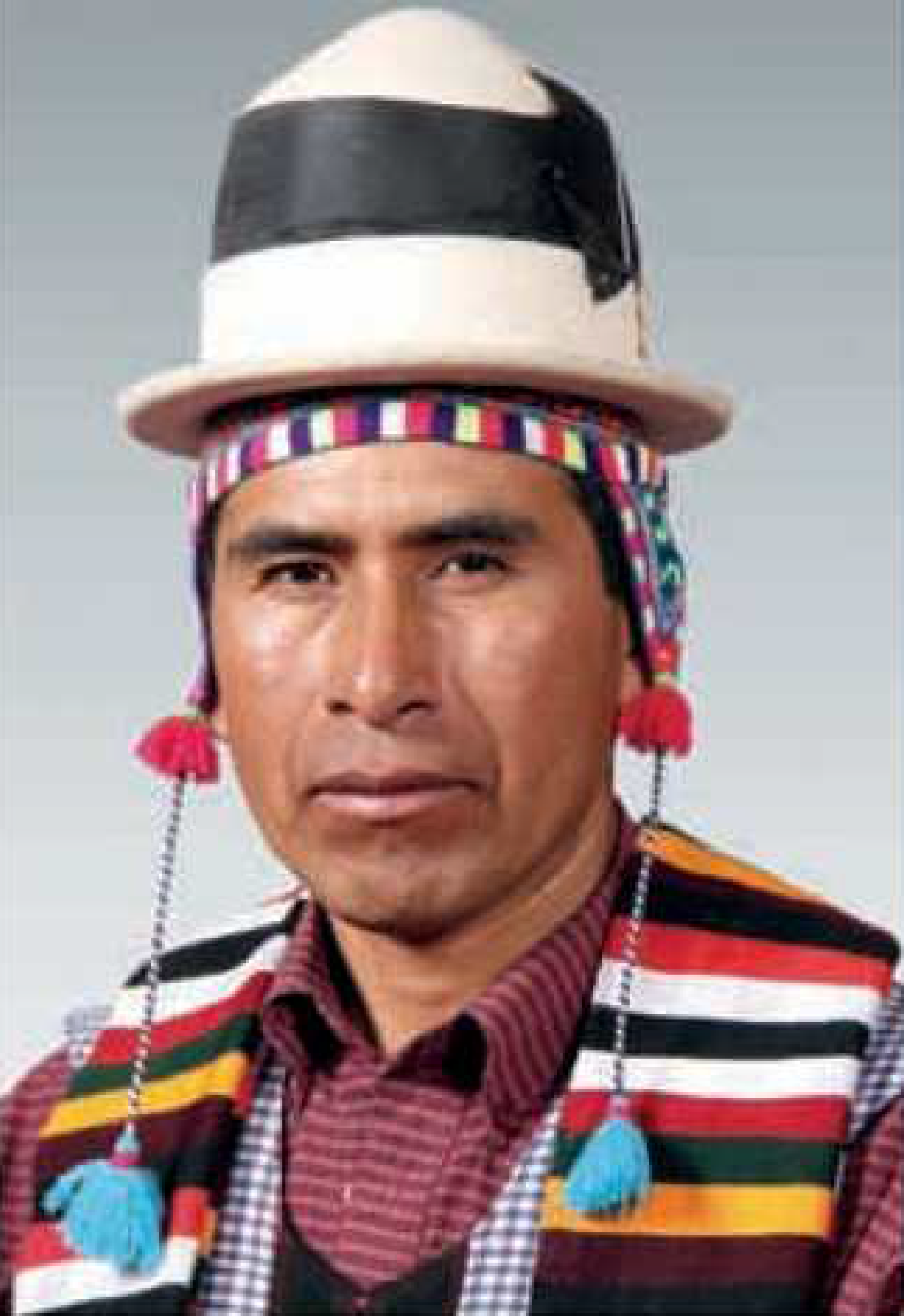
- Official portrait, 2014

Member of the Chamber of Deputies from Potosí circumscription 41
- In office 19 January 2010 – 18 January 2015
- Substitute: Rita Callahuara
- Preceded by: Severo Pacaja
- Succeeded by: Circumscription abolished
- Constituency: Chayanta

Constituent of the Constituent Assembly from Potosí circumscription 41
- In office 6 August 2006 – 14 December 2007
- Constituency: Chayanta

Personal details
- Born: Severo Aguilar Gabriel; 11 March 1975 (age 51) Futina, Potosí, Bolivia
- Party: Movement for Socialism
- Occupation: Politician; trade unionist

Severo Aguilar Gabriel (born 11 March 1975) is a Bolivian politician and trade unionist who served as a member of the Chamber of Deputies from Potosí, representing circumscription 41 from 2010 to 2015. A member of the Movement for Socialism, he previously served as a member of the Constituent Assembly from Potosí, representing the same circumscription from 2006 to 2007.

An ethnic Quechua, Aguilar spent his early life in the rural regions of northern Potosí, dedicated to work in agriculture and animal husbandry. Having spent a few years abroad and in other departments, Aguilar returned to his native Chayanta in the early 2000s, where he gained prominence locally as a community and organizational leader. Aguilar's active participation in promoting regional concerns catapulted his participation in politics, first in the Constituent Assembly, then the Chamber of Deputies, each time representing his home province.

== Early life and career ==
Severo Aguilar was born on 11 March 1975 to Crisóstomo Aguilar Estrada and Felipa Gabriel Cruz, a peasant family native to Futina in northern Potosí's Chayanta Province—one of the poorest and most isolated regions in the country. An ethnic Quechua, Aguilar spent his childhood in rural poverty, working in agriculture and animal husbandry. Orphaned at around age 13, he relocated to Pocoata, briefly attending the local primary school before moving to Llallagua, where he completed secondary education and fulfilled his term of mandatory military service. Shortly after graduating, Aguilar traveled to Argentina, where he spent a year harvesting the tobacco and tomato crop, later settling in Santa Cruz for some time.

Upon returning to Potosí in 2001, Aguilar dedicated himself to promoting civic engagement in his community, pushing for greater allocation of resources in favor of public works and other infrastructure projects. From there, Aguilar quickly rose as a prominent local peasant leader. In January 2002, he was appointed as executive secretary of the Colquechaca Sectional Center, assuming the demands of the entire municipality's peasant movement. During the 2003 gas conflict, Aguilar led mobilizations against the government of Gonzalo Sánchez de Lozada, rejecting the sale of natural gas to Chile and calling for the convocation of a constituent assembly to reform the Constitution—two demands that proved successful in the ensuing years.

== Constituent Assembly ==
=== Election ===
In 2006, in representation of the Unified Syndical Center of Indigenous Workers and Ayllus of the Chayanta Province, Aguilar was nominated for a seat in the newly-formed Constituent Assembly. Together with Irma Mamani, the pair was comfortably elected to represent circumscription 41 on behalf of the Movement for Socialism.

=== Tenure ===
For Aguilar, whose rural community lacked public transport services, the trek to Constituent Assembly's headquarters in Sucre required a four-hour hike through the foothills before a truck finally took him the rest of the way. Once sworn in, Aguilar was appointed the to assembly's Autonomies Commission, from which he pushed for the implementation of a broad system of indigenous self-government, including state recognition of indigenous customary law and control over natural resources situated in indigenous lands.

=== Commission assignments ===
- Departmental, Provincial, Municipal, and Indigenous Autonomies, Decentralization, and Territorial Organization Commission (2006–2007)

== Chamber of Deputies ==
=== Election ===
For many members of the Constituent Assembly, prolonged procedural stalemate and limited debate made it difficult to stand out individually. As a result, few constituents continued political careers following the assembly's closure. Aguilar, on the other hand, was among the roughly one-tenth who did. In 2009, party bases in his home region nominated him to seek a seat in the Chamber of Deputies. He once again contested circumscription 41 and was elected by one of the largest margins of the entire election cycle, attaining nearly ninety percent of the popular vote.

=== Tenure ===
As a deputy, Aguilar sought to coordinate his work with municipal administrations in order to directly meet their needs. He promoted the allocation of public resources in favor of agriculture, the expansion of rural education, and the construction of infrastructure aimed at combating the consequences of climate change. Upon the conclusion of his term, he was not nominated for reelection, no less because the district he represented was abolished during 2014's decennial redistribution process.

=== Commission assignments ===
- Territorial Organization of the State and Autonomies Commission
  - Departmental Autonomies Committee (Secretary: 2012–2015)
- Plural Economy, Production, and Industry Commission
  - Agriculture and Animal Husbandry Committee (2010–2011)
- International Relations and Migrant Protection Commission
  - International Relations, Migrant Protection, and International Organizations Committee (Secretary: 2011–2012)

== Electoral history ==
Electoral history of Severo Aguilar
Year	Office	Party	Votes			Result	Ref.
Year	Office	Party	Total	%	P.	Result	Ref.
2006	Constituent	Movement for Socialism	8,496	61.48%	1st	Won	
2009	Deputy	Movement for Socialism	21,279	88.23%	1st	Won	
Source: Plurinational Electoral Organ | Electoral Atlas

Bolivian Constituent Assembly
Seat established	Constituent of the Constituent Assembly from Potosí circumscription 41; 2006–2007; Served alongside: Irma Mamani, Néstor Torres	Seat dissolved
Chamber of Deputies of Bolivia
Preceded by Severo Pacaja	Member of the Chamber of Deputies from Potosí circumscription 41; 2010–2015	Circumscription abolished
