= Plan Progress for Bolivia – National Convergence =

Plan Progress for Bolivia – National Convergence Plan Progreso para Bolivia–Convergencia Nacional
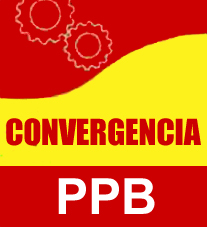
- Leader: Manfred Reyes Villa
- Founded: 4 September 2009
- Dissolved: c. November 2013
- Preceded by: New Republican Force
- Succeeded by: APB Súmate
- Headquarters: La Paz
- Ideology: Conservatism
- Political position: Centre-right to right-wing
- Colors: Red

Plan Progress for Bolivia – National Convergence (Spanish: Plan Progreso para Bolivia–Convergencia Nacional; acronym: PPB-CN) was a coalition that was Bolivia's largest national opposition political entity following the 2009 general elections. PPB-CN was a Bolivian political alliance of the right-wing formed in advance of the 2009 elections. The alliance was created at a meeting in La Paz's Zona Sur on 4 September 2009 by Manfred Reyes Villa, Plan Progress for Bolivia (Plan Progreso para Bolivia; PPB), represented by José Luis Paredes, the former prefect of La Paz department; Autonomy for Bolivia (Autonomía Para Bolivia; APB) led by Luis Alberto Serrate Middagh; Peoples Party (Partido Popular; PP) led by Pablo Nicolás Camacho Bedregal; and the Nationalist Revolutionary Movement (Movimiento Nacionalista Revolucionario; MNR), led by Guillermo Bedregal Gutiérrez. However, the alliance did not continue to function in Bolivia's 2014 elections, and several of its elected senators stated in late 2013 that its role is ending.

In the 2009 election, its presidential candidate was Manfred Reyes Villa, former head of the New Republican Force, and former prefect of Cochabamba Department and former mayor of Cochabamba. Other leading figures included Leopoldo Fernández, the jailed former prefect of Pando Department who was its vice-presidential candidate; and Germán Antelo, who headed its Senatorial list in Santa Cruz Department.

The alliance placed second in the presidential contest of 2009, with the Reyes Villa-Fernández ticket winning 1.212.795 votes (26,46% of valid votes cast). It became the second largest force in the Plurinational Legislative Assembly with 37 (out of 130) deputies and 10 (out of 36) senators.
