= Jorge =

- Pronunciation: Portuguese: [ˈʒɔɾʒɨ] Spanish: [ˈxoɾxe] /ˈhɔːrheɪ/ HOR-he
- Gender: Male
- Language: Portuguese and Spanish

Origin
- Origin: Greek

Other names
- Related names: Jorginho, George, Georgia, Georgina, Georgianna, Georgine

Jorge is the Spanish and Portuguese form of the given name George. While spelled alike, this name is pronounced very differently in each of the two languages: Spanish [ˈxoɾxe]; Portuguese [ˈʒɔɾʒɨ].

It is derived from the Greek name Γεώργιος (Georgios) via Latin Georgius; the former is derived from γεωργός (georgos), meaning "farmer" or "earth-worker".

The Latin form Georgius had been rarely given in Western Christendom since at least the 6th century. The popularity of the name however develops from around the 12th century, in Occitan in the form Jordi, and it becomes popular at European courts after the publication of the Golden Legend in the 1260s.

The West Iberian form Jorge is on record in Portugal as the name of Jorge de Lencastre, Duke of Coimbra (1481–1550).

== List of people with the given name Jorge ==
- Jorge (1939–2018), Brazilian footballer
- Jorge (1946–2018), Brazilian footballer
- Jorge, Brazilian musician and singer, Jorge & Mateus
- Jorge (born 1982), real name George Papagheorghe, Romanian singer, actor, TV host
- Jorge Abbott (born 1947), Chilean judge
- Jorge Ábrego (born 1964), Spanish footballer and manager
- Jorge Abreu (born 1990), Venezuelan cyclist
- Jorge Afonso (c.1470–1540), Portuguese Renaissance painter
- Jorge Agostini (1910–1955), Cuban military and government official, revolutionary, and fencer
- Jorge Aguirre, several people
- Jorge Ahumada (born 1946), Argentine boxer
- Jorge Alcalá (born 1995), Dominican baseball player
- Jorge Alessandri (1896–1986), Chilean politician and 26th President of Chile
- Jorge Alfaro (born 1993), Colombian baseball player
- Jorge Alfonso (born 1971), Argentine footballer and manager
- Jorge Almirón (born 1971), Argentine footballer
- Jorge Alonso (born 1985), Spanish footballer
- Jorge Alonso (born 1958), Spanish water polo player
- Jorge L. Alonso (born 1966), United States district judge
- Jorge Alonso Treviño (born 1935), governor of Nuevo León, Mexico
- Jorge Alvarez, several people
- Jorge Alves (born 1979), American ice hockey goaltender
- Jorge Alves (born 1991), Cape Verdean footballer
- Jorge Amado (1912–2001), Brazilian writer
- Jorge Andrade (born 1978), Portuguese footballer
- Jorge Antonio (1917–2007), Argentine businessman and politician
- Jorge Aparicio (born 1989), Mexican footballer
- Jorge Aparicio (born 1992), Guatemalan footballer
- Jorge Arce (born 1979), Mexican boxer
- Jorge Argueta, Salvadoran poet
- Jorge Luis Lara Aguilar (born 1954), Mexican politician, deputy attorney-general
- Jorge Arreaza (born 1973), Venezuelan politician
- Jorge Asís (born 1946), Argentine writer, journalist and politician
- Jorge Astiazarán Orcí (born 1962), Mexican politician
- Jorge Avila-Torrez (born 1988), American serial killer and rapist
- Jorge Azcón (born 1973), Spanish politician
- Jorge Basadre (1903–1980), Peruvian historian
- Jorge Ben (born 1939), Brazilian musician
- Jorge Benguché (born 1996), Honduran footballer
- Jorge Bergoglio (1936–2025), Argentine pastor known professionally as Pope Francis
- Jorge Betancourt (born 1982), Cuban diver
- Jorge Bolaño (1977–2025), Colombian footballer
- Jorge Bonaldi (born 1949), Uruguayan singer, composer and guitarist
- Jorge Burruchaga (born 1962), Argentine footballer and manager
- Jorge Caballero (born 1992), Mexican actor
- Jorge Cabrera, American politician
- Jorge Cabrera (born 1963), Uruguayan footballer
- Jorge Cadete (born 1968), Portuguese footballer
- Jorge Calandrelli (1939–2026), Argentine composer, arranger and conductor
- Jorge Caldara (1924–1967), Argentine bandoneonist, orchestra conductor, and composer
- Jorge Camacho (born 1956), Bolivian footballer
- Jorge Camacho (1934–2011), Cuban painter
- Jorge Camacho (born 1966), Spanish writer
- Jorge Campos (born 1966), Mexican football player
- Jorge Cantú (born 1982), Mexican-American baseball player
- Jorge Cárdenas, several people
- Jorge Carrascal (born 1998), Colombian footballer
- Jorge Aravena Carrasco (1903–1983), Chilean farmer and politician
- Jorge Castañeda, several people
- Jorge Castillo, several people
- Jorge Castro, several people
- Jorge Cham (born 1976), Panamanian cartoonist
- Jorge Chavez (1887–1910), French-Peruvian aviator
- Jorge Choquetarqui (born 1968), Bolivian politician
- Jorge Cimadevilla (born 1965), American football player
- Jorge Coelho (1954–2021), Portuguese politician
- Jorge Coll (born 1977/1978), Spanish art dealer
- Jorge Costa (1971–2025), football player
- Jorge Cruz, several people
- Jorge Díaz, several people
- Jorge Donn (1947–1992), Argentine ballet dancer
- Jorge Ebanks (born 1986), Cayman Islands basketball player
- Jorge De La Rosa (born 1981), baseball pitcher
- Jorge Delgado, multiple people
- Jorge Eliécer Gaitán (1903–1948), Colombian politician
- Jorge Enrique Adoum (1926–2009), Ecuadorian writer
- Jorge Falcón (born 1953), Peruvian comedian
- Jorge Fernandes, several people
- Jorge Fernández, several people
- Jorge Fossati (born 1952), Uruguayan footballer and coach
- Jorge Fucile (born 1984), Uruguayan footballer
- Jorge Garbajosa (born 1977), Spanish basketball player
- Jorge García, several people
- Jorge Glas (born 1969), Vice President of Ecuador from 2013 to 2018
- Jorge Gomes, several people
- Jorge Gómez, several people
- Jorge González, several people
- Jorge Grant (born 1994), English footballer
- Jorge Guerrero, several people
- Jorge Guillén (1893–1984), Spanish poet
- Jorge Guinle (1916–2004), Brazilian businessman
- Jorge Gutiérrez, several people
- Jorge R. Gutierrez (born 1975), Mexican animator
- Jorge Guzmán, several people
- Jorge Hernández, several people
- Jorge Herrera, several people
- Jorge Humberto Martínez (born 1975), Colombian road cyclist
- Jorge Jesus (born 1954), Portuguese football manager
- Jorge Jiménez, several people
- Jorge Juan, several people
- Jorge de Juan (born 1961), Spanish film and theater actor, producer, and director
- Jorge Julio (born 1979), Venezuelan baseball player
- Jorge Kahwagi (born 1968), Mexican businessman, politician, and show business personality
- Jorge Lafond (1952–2003), Brazilian actor, comedian, dancer, and drag queen
- Jorge Lanata (1960–2024), Argentine journalist and writer
- Jorge Cerdán Lara (1897–1958), Mexican politician, governor of Veracruz
- Jorge Salvador Lara (1926–2012), Ecuadorian politician diplomat, columnist, writer, and historian
- Jorge Leite (born 1950), corrupt Portuguese-Canadian officer
- Jorge Paulo Lemann (born 1939), Swiss-Brazilian banker and businessman
- Jorge Lencina (born 1976), Argentine judoka
- Jorge Lendeborg Jr. (born 1996), American actor
- Jorge Liderman (1957–2008), American composer
- Jorge Linares (born 1985), Venezuelan boxer
- Jorge Linck (1915–2007), Argentine sailor
- Jorge López, several people
- Jorge Lorenzo (born 1987), Spanish motorcycle racer
- Jorge Luís, several people
- Jorge Luis Alcantar Bolly (born 1984), Mexican professional wrestler
- Jorge Luis Borges (1899–1986), Argentine author
- Jorge Luna (born 1986), Argentine footballer
- Jorge Luna (born 1994), Venezuelan association football player
- Jorge Majfud (born 1969), Uruguayan-American writer
- Jorge Marco de Oliveira Moraes (born 1996), Brazilian footballer
- Jorge Mario Bergoglio (1936–2025), Argentine Roman Catholic priest, Pope Francis
- Jorge Martín (born 1998), Spanish motorcycle racer
- Jorge Martinez, several people
- Jorge Mas (born 1963), American businessman
- Jorge Mas Canosa (1939–1997), Cuban-American businessman
- Jorge Masvidal (born 1984), American mixed martial artist
- Jorge Mateo (born 1995), Dominican baseball player
- Jorge Mendes (born 1966), Portuguese football agent
- Jorge Mendonça (born 1938), Angolan footballer
- Jorge Mendonça (born 1954) (1954–2006), Brazilian footballer
- Jorge Meré (born 1997), Spanish footballer
- Jorge Molina (born 1988), Peruvian midfield footballer
- Jorge Mondragón (born 1963), Mexican diver
- Jorge Mondragón (1903–1997), Mexican actor
- Jorge Montenegro (born 1968), Cuban shot putter
- Jorge Luis Montenegro (born 1988), Ecuadorian cyclist
- Jorge Martín Montenegro (born 1983), Argentine cyclist
- Jorge Mora López (born 1967), Colombian military officer and politician
- Jorge Moreno (born 1975), Cuban-American musician and entrepreneur
- Jorge Moreno (born 2001), Spanish footballer
- Jorge Müller (disappeared 1974), Chilean missing man
- Jorge Muñoz, several people
- Jorge Negrete (1911–1953), Mexican actor
- Jorge Newbery (1875–1914), Argentine aviator, civil servant, engineer and scientist
- Jorge Novak (1928–2001), Argentine Roman Catholic priest
- Jorge Nuno Pinto da Costa (1937–2025), Portuguese businessman
- Jorge Ochoa (born 1950), Colombian drug trafficker
- Jorge Otálvaro (born 1964), Colombian road cyclist
- Jorge Orta (born 1950), Mexican baseball player
- Jorge Páez (born 1965), Mexican boxer
- Jorge Peixinho (1940–1995), Portuguese composer
- Jorge Pérez, several people
- Jorge M. Pérez (born 1949), Argentine-American businessman
- Jorge Pescara (born 1966), Brazilian musician
- Jorge Pina, several people
- Jorge Pinto (born 1987), Portuguese politician
- Jorge Pizzani (born 1949), Venezuelan artist
- Jorge Polanco (born 1993), Dominican baseball player
- Jorge Porcel (1936–2006), Argentine actor
- Jorge Posada (born 1970), Puerto Rican baseball player
- Jorge Pullin (born 1963), Argentine physicist
- Jorge Querejeta (born 1968), Argentine field hockey player
- Jorge Quinteros (born 1974), Argentine football player
- Jorge Quinteros, Chilean mountaineer
- Jorge Racca (born 1971), Argentine-Italian basketball player
- Jorge Rafael Videla (1925–2013), 43rd Argentine president and dictator
- Jorge Ramos, several people
- Jorge Recalde (1951–2001), Argentine rally driver
- Jorge Recalde (born 1992), Paraguayan footballer
- Jorge Reixa (born 1993), Guinea-Bissau-Portuguese footballer
- Jorge Reyes, several people
- Jorge Ribeiro (born 1981), Portuguese footballer
- Jorge Richardson (born 1976), Puerto Rican track and field athlete
- Jorge Alberto Lara Rivera (1966–2024), Mexican politician
- Jorge Rivera-Herrans, Puerto Rican playwright, composer, lyricist, and actor
- Jorge Rivero (born 1938), Mexican actor
- Jorge Riveros (born 1934), Colombian painter, sculptor and illustrator
- Jorge Rodríguez, several people
- Jorge Rossy (born 1964), Spanish musician
- Jorge Ruiz, several people
- Jorge Russek (1932–1998), Mexican actor
- Jorge Sáenz (born 1996), Spanish footballer
- Jorge Saffirio (born 1953), Chilean politician
- Jorge Salinas, several people
- Jorge Sampaio (1939–2021), President of Portugal from 1996 to 2006
- Jorge Sampaoli (born 1960), Argentine football manager
- Jorge Sánchez, several people
- Jorge Santana (1951–2020), Mexican guitarist
- Jorge Santiago (born 1980), Brazilian mixed martial arts fighter
- Jorge Semprún (1923–2011), Spanish writer
- Jorge de Sena (1919–1978), Portuguese-born poet, novelist, dramatist, and translator
- Jorge Simão (born 1976), Portuguese football manager
- Jorge Solari (born 1941), Argentine footballer and manager
- Jorge Soler (born 1992), Cuban baseball player
- Jorge Solís (born 1979), Mexican boxer
- Jorge Sosa, several people
- Jorge Suárez, several people
- Jorge Taiana (born 1950), Argentine politician
- Jorge Taufua (born 1991), Samoa-Tonga international rugby league footballer
- Jorge Teixeira (born 1986), Portuguese footballer
- Jorge Torres, several people
- Jorge Ulate (born 1956), Costa Rican footballer
- Jorge Uliarte, Argentine conductor
- Jorge Ulloa (born 1958), Chilean politician
- Jorge Valdano (born 1955), Argentine footballer and manager
- Jorge Valdivia (born 1983), Chilean footballer
- Jorge Valenzuela (born 1965/1966), American soccer player
- Jorge Varela, several people
- Jorge Vázquez, several people
- Jorge Velásquez (born 1946), Panamanian horse racing jockey
- Jorge Vargas, several people
- Jorge Villafaña (born 1989), American soccer player
- Jorge Villavicencio (1958–2020), Guatemalan politician and physician
- Jorge Zamacona (born 1959), American television writer and producer
- Jorge Zárate, several people
- Jorge Zarif (born 1992), Brazilian sailor
- Jorge Zorreguieta (1928–2017), Argentine politician

== Surname ==
- Artur Jorge, several people
- Carlos Jorge (born 1966), Portuguese footballer and manager
- Carlos Jorge (born 1986), Dominican Republic sprinter, hurdler and long jumper
- Fernando Jorge, several people
- Gabriela Jorge, several people
- Kaio Jorge (born 2002), Brazilian footballer
- Mário Jorge, several people
- Óscar Jorge (1936–2025), Argentine politician
- Paulo Jorge, several people
- Rui Jorge (born 1973), Portuguese football manager and former player
- Rui Jorge (politician) (born 1998), Brazilian politician
- Seu Jorge (born 1970), Brazilian musician

== See also ==
- Storm Jorge in the 2019–20 European windstorm season
