= Castañeda =

Spanish surname

- Blazon of an Hidalgo family named Castañeda
- Pronunciation: /ˌkæstəˈnjeɪdə/ Spanish: [kastaˈɲeða] Latin America: [kastaˈɲeða]

Origin
- Language: Spanish
- Meaning: "chestnut forest"
- Region of origin: Spain, Portugal

Other names
- Variant forms: Castaneda; Castanheda

Castañeda or Castaneda is a Spanish surname.

The name's meaning is habitational, from any of various places in Santander, Asturias, and Salamanca, derived from castañeda, a collective of castaña "chestnut". The name is believed to be created by the fact that the bourgeois House of Castañeda was situated in a valley of chestnuts, thus meaning "Castle of the Chestnuts."

In non-Hispanic countries, the name is usually spelled Castaneda (without the tilde). In Portuguese, this name is spelled Castanheda.

The surname can be found primarily in Spain, Portugal and the Americas, as a result of the Spanish conquest of North, Central and South America.

== People with the surname ==
- Aldo Castañeda (1930-2021), Guatemalan pediatric cardiac surgeon
- Aldrin Castañeda (born 1972), Filipino gymnastics coach
- Cacho Castaneda (1942–2019, Humberto Vicente Castagna), Argentine singer and actor
- Carlos Castañeda (footballer) (born 1963), former Guatemalan football player
- Carlos Castaneda (1925–1998), American author on Mesoamerican shamanism
- Carlos Castañeda (historian) (1897–1958), historian
- Cristián Castañeda (born 1968), Chilean football player
- David Castañeda (born 1989), Mexican-American actor
- Germán Villa Castañeda, Mexican football player
- Guadalupe Castañeda, retired Mexican footballer
- Hector-Neri Castañeda (1924–1991), Guatemalan philosopher and author
- Javier Castañeda, former Spanish footballer
- Jessi Knudsen Castañeda, SciShow Kids host
- Jean Castaneda (born 1957), former French footballer
- Jorge Castañeda (disambiguation), multiple people with the name
- Jose L. Castaneda, American politician
- Jorge Ubico y Castañeda (1878–1946), President of Guatemala 1931–1944
- Juan Castañeda (born 1980), Spanish championship fencer
- Juan de la Concha Castañeda (1818–1903), Spanish lawyer and politician
- Justiniano Borgoño Castañeda (1836–1921), Peruvian soldier and politician, President of Peru briefly in 1894
- Luis Castañeda, Peruvian politician, mayor of Lima
- Luis Orán Castañeda (1979–2020), Colombian road cyclist
- Maureen Castaneda, American businesswoman, former officer of Enron Corporation
- Movita Castaneda (1916–2015), American actress, second wife of Marlon Brando
- Natalia Castañeda Arbelaez (born 1982), Colombian painter
- Oliverio Castañeda, Guatemalan student leader, who fought for civil rights and was assassinated at the age of 23 in Guatemala City during the regime of General Romeo Lucas García.
- Gerardo Castañeda, former Olympic shooter from Guatemala
- Patricio Castañeda, Chilean footballer
