= Jorginho =

Jorginho (Brazilian Portuguese: [ʒɔʁˈʒĩɲu]) is a Portuguese-language diminutive name of Jorge, which may refer to:

- Jorginho (footballer, born 1924), born Jorge Ceciliano, Brazilian football forward
- Jorginho Putinatti (born 1959), born Jorge Antônio Putinatti, Brazilian football midfielder
- Jorginho (footballer, born 1964), born Jorge de Amorim Campos, Brazilian international football right-back and current manager
- Jorginho (footballer, born 1965), born Jorge Luís da Silva, Brazilian football midfielder and current manager
- Jorginho Baiano (born 1966), born Jorge Luiz de Souza Ramos, Brazilian football central defender
- Jorginho (beach soccer) (born 1974), born Jorge Augusto da Cunha Gabriel, Brazilian beach soccer winger
- Jorginho (footballer, born February 1975), born Jorge Marcelo de Araújo, Brazilian football midfielder
- Jorginho (footballer, born October 1975), born Jorge Claudio Conceiçao Rodriguez, Brazilian football midfielder and manager
- Jorginho (footballer, born 1977), born Jorge Luiz Pereira de Sousa, Brazilian football forward
- Jorginho (footballer, born 1978), born Jorge Manuel Amador Galufo, Portuguese football left-back
- Jorginho (footballer, born 1979), born Jorge Luiz de Amorim Silva, Brazilian football striker
- Jorginho Paulista (born 1980), born Jorge Henrique Amaral de Castro, Brazilian football left wing-back
- Jorginho (footballer, born 1985), born Jorge Pereira da Silva, Brazilian football striker
- Jorginho (footballer, born 1988), born Jorge Vinícius Oliveira Alves, Brazilian football forward
- Jorginho (footballer, born 5 January 1991), born Jorge de Moura Xavier, Brazilian football attacking midfielder
- Jorginho (footballer, born 25 January 1991), born Jorge Mesqueu Neto, Brazilian football midfielder
- Jorginho (footballer, born December 1991), born Jorge Luiz Frello Filho, Brazilian-born Italian international football midfielder
- Jorginho James (born 1994), Jamaican international footballer
- Jorginho (footballer, born 1995), born Jorge Fernando Barbosa Intima, Bissau-Guinean international winger
- Jorginho (footballer, born 1997), born Jorge Gabriel Costa Monteiro, Portuguese football striker
- Jorginho (footballer, born May 1998), born Jorge Nunes Sampaio, Portuguese football defender
- Jorginho (footballer, born June 1998), born Ricardo Jorge Silva Araújo, Portuguese football defender
