= Jorge Martinez =

Jorge Martínez may refer to:

== Academics ==
- Jorge Loring Martinez (1889–1936), Spanish engineer and entrepreneur

== Arts and Entertainment ==
- Jorge Martínez de Hoyos (1920–1997), Mexican actor
- Jorge Martinez (Argentine actor) (born 1947), comedian in Chiquititas
- Jorge "Lobito" Martínez (1952–2003), Paraguayan musician

== Criminals ==
- Jorge A. Martinez (born 1951), physician; received a sentence of life imprisonment in 2006 for submitting $60 million in claims for unnecessary procedures in the first prosecution in US history involving a charge of health care fraud resulting in death

== Politics ==
- Jorge Martínez Busch (1936–2011), Chilean naval officer, commander-in-chief 1990–1997
- Jorge Martí Martínez (fl. 2003-2021), Cuban politician and diplomat
- Jorge Estévez Martínez (fl. 2009-2021), Puerto Rican politician, mayor of Añasco

== Sports ==
- Jorge Martínez (football manager) (born 1960), Mexican former football manager
- Jorge Martínez (motorcyclist) (born 1962), Spanish Grand Prix motorcycle road racer
- Jorge Martínez (footballer, born 1973), Argentine international football defender
- Jorge Humberto Martínez (born 1975), Colombian road cyclist
- Jorge Martínez (footballer, born April 1983), Uruguayan international football midfielder
- Jorge Martínez (footballer, born November 1983), Uruguayan football midfielder
