= Castaneda (disambiguation) =

Castañeda is a surname.

Castañeda or Castaneda may also refer to:

- Castaneda (band) an American Indie Pop band
- La Castañeda, a Mexican rock band
- La Castañeda (psychiatric institution), Mexican General Asylum
- Castañeda, Cantabria, a municipality in Cantabria, Spain
- Castaneda, Switzerland, a municipality in the district of Moesa, Graubünden canton, Switzerland
- Dr. Carlos Castañeda Elementary School, a school in McAllen, Texas, USA

== See also ==
- Alfonso Castañeda, Nueva Vizcaya, a municipality in Nueva Vizcaya province, the Philippines
- Perry–Castañeda Library, a library of the University of Texas Austin
