= Jorge Luis García =

Jorge Luis García may refer to:

- Jorge Luis Garcia (1953–2010), politician from the U.S. state of Arizona
- Jorge Luis García Carneiro (1952–2021), Venezuelan army general and politician
- Jorge Luis García Pérez (born 1964), Afro-Cuban activist
- Jorge Luis García Rivas (born 2002), Mexican footballer

== See also ==
- Jorge García (disambiguation)
