= Alexey Fedorychev =

Hungarian businessman, sport executive and trader

- Alekszej Fedoricsev
- Born: 3 August 1955 (age 70); Krasnogorsk, Moscow Oblast, Russian SFSR, USSR
- Citizenship: Hungarian
- Occupations: businessman, sport executive, trader

Alexey Mikhailovich Fedorychev (Hungarian: Alekszej Mihajlovics Fedoricsev; born 3 August 1955, Krasnogorsk, USSR) is businessman, commodity trader (grain, sulphur, fertiliser), he is owner of two sea terminals in Pivdennyi Port (operated by TIS), former owner of the FC Dynamo Moscow and FC Rostov. He is the founder of Fedcominvest and sponsor of AS Monaco Basket.

Fedorychev resides in Monaco and holds a citizenship of Hungary and Uruguay. in 2006 by Forbes magazine it was included in the list of the richest businessmen in Russia, where he held the 100th place with the state of $450 million$.

As of the mid-2000s, Fedorychev's assets included, apart from the Pivdennyi Port terminal, Ust-Donetsky River Port, Astrakhangazprom, Prydniprovsky Chemical Plant fertilisers, transhipment terminals in the Kerch Strait and a fleet of more than 50 sea and river vessels with a cargo turnover of around 4.5 million tonnes of sulphur, 2.3 million tonnes of fertiliser and 1.7 million tonnes of grain in 2004.

== Early life ==
He was born in Krasnogorsk, Moscow Oblast.

In the early 1970s he played for the Zorky Krasnogorsk bandy club. In 1973, while serving in a sports company of the Dzerzhinsky Division, was invited to the backup of the FC Dynamo Moscow, then played for FC Kryvbas Kryvyi Rih.

=== Career ===
In 1987, he left the USSR. Fedorychev was involved in the railway sleeper trade, later became involved in the fertiliser trade and handled Uralkali's foreign trade operations. In December 1994, he registered a company Fedcom in Monaco, specialising in the export of sulphur and fertilisers from the former USSR. In the mid-1990s, the entrepreneur managed to sell sulphur from Astrakhangazprom on international markets. Fedcom has sponsored football clubs in the south of France since the second half of the 1990s. Active sponsorship activities and links to Eastern Europe aroused the suspicions of French law enforcers, but apart from forged passports on one of the firm's employees, no criminal elements were found in the activities; nevertheless, when Fedorychev offered to buy a controlling stake in the AS Monaco FC for €100 million in 2002, Prince Rainier III didn’t give his consent.

In the mid-2000s, he invested in a large agricultural holding in the Orel Oblast.

Between 2004 and 2007, Fedorychev's structures owned a controlling stake in FC Dynamo Moscow. Immediately after joining the team, Fedorychev began investing money in it: In the 2005 season the investment amounted to around $100 million, thanks to which the club bought or leased Portuguese players Maniche, Costinha, Nuno Espírito Santo, Nuno Frechaut, Jorge Ribeiro, Cícero Semedo, Luís Loureiro, Almami Moreira, Danny; Brazilians players Tiago Silva, Derlei, Jean, Jorge Luiz; Greek player Giourkas Seitaridis; Peruvian player Andres Mendoza and invited Brazilian coach Ivo Wortmann. There were also plans to build a new stadium and renovate the base in Novogorsk. However, two years after acquiring FC Dynamo Moscow, the entrepreneur lost interest in it. There were plans to buy the land in Petrovsky Park, which belonged to the club, but they failed to do so. The team incurred multi-million dollar debts and Fedorychev sold the club.

In January 2022, he became President of the AS Monaco Basket.

=== Personal life ===
Fedorychev is married to Ulyana Tseytlina, a model who shot for the Russian edition of Vogue magazine in the 1990s. He has two sons Savva and Mikhail Fedorychev.
