= The Lia Show =

Nationally syndicated country music and entertainment radio program

The Lia Show, formerly known as Neon Nights and Cryin’, Lovin’ or Leavin’, is a nationally syndicated country music and entertainment radio program hosted by Lia Knight (born in Kentucky). The program airs nightly from 7 pm to midnight locally across the United States. Based out of Seattle, Washington, The Lia Show is an artist-driven program with interviews from the top names in the country music industry and the film and television industries. The show is known for its caller hotlines.

The Lia Show continues to grow. Whereas in its infancy, it focused primarily on country music, the show has branched out considerably and has featured several high-profile celebrity guests, such as Jenny McCarthy, Bill Engvall, UFC fighters Chuck Liddell, Forrest Griffin, and Matt Hughes, Piers Morgan, Larry the Cable Guy, Chelsea Handler, Jorge Cruz, and many more.

Lia has won a number of awards over the years, most recently being Best Broadcasting Personality presented at the Country Music Awards in 2008. Locally she has also been recognized for her community service with a Service Above Self Award in 2002.

The program is syndicated by Westwood One. It had originally been carried on KRPM (now KBKS-FM) in Seattle prior to 1996, then on KXDD in Yakima after KRPM changed formats in 1996. In 1998, Jones Radio Networks added the program to its syndicated lineup; it survived through numerous corporate changes (from Jones to Dial Global in 2009, then to the modern Westwood One in 2013) since then. It was added to the Nash FM network (which, like Westwood One, is a Cumulus Media property) in August 2020 as the network's overnight show, branded as "Later with Lia."

On December 2, 2022, Westwood One announced that it had cancelled the program, effective December 31.

== Awards ==
In 2008, Lia won the top honors at the Country Music Awards (Personality of the Year) and the Gracies (Entertainer of the Year). In 2007, the show was nominated for the Syndicated Personality/Show of the Year award by Radio & Records magazine. Other finalists included Delilah, Blair Garner, Steve Harvey, Kidd Kraddick, and John Tesh.

== See also ==
- Delilah Rene, a lovesongs show that has some similarities to this program
