= Patricia Jorge =

Patricia Jorge may refer to:

- Patricia Jorge (rhythmic gymnast), Portuguese gymnast
- Patricia Gabriela Jorge, Argentine politician
