= Jorge Torres =

Jorge Torres may refer to:

- Jorge Torres (baseball) (1918–1982), Cuban baseball player, nicknamed "Cocoliso"
- Jorge Torres (footballer) (born 1999), Peruvian soccer player
- Jorge Torres (runner) (born 1980), American distance runner
- Jorge Torres López (born 1954), Mexican politician
- Jorge Torres Nilo (born 1988), Mexican international soccer player
- Jorge Torres Palacios (c. 1960s–2014), Mexican journalist
- Jorge Torres Obleas (born 1957), Bolivian politician
- Jorge Torres Vallejo (1934–2007), Peruvian politician
- Jorge González Torres (born 1942), Mexican politician and founder of the Ecologist Green Party of Mexico
- Jorge Humberto Torres (born 1962), Mexican soccer manager and former player
- Jorge Torres Jr. (1978–2020), American murder victim

== See also ==
- Jorge Avila-Torrez (born 1988), American serial killer
