= Riveros =

Riveros is a Spanish surname. Notable people with the name include:

- Bárbara Riveros Díaz (born 1987), Chilean triathlete
- Cristian Riveros (born 1982), Paraguayan footballer
- Galvarino Riveros Cárdenas (1829–1892), Chilean naval officer
- Guillermo Riveros (1902–1959), former Chilean football defender
- Jaime Riveros (born 1970), Chilean footballer
- Jorge Riveros (born 1934), Colombian painter, sculptor and illustrator
- Juan Riveros (born 1946), former Paraguayan footballer
- Marcos Riveros (born 1988), Paraguayan footballer
- Santiago Omar Riveros (1923–2024), Argentinian military officer and criminal
