= Jorge Lara =

Jorge Lara can refer to:

- Jorge Salvador Lara (1926–2012), Ecuadorian politician
- Jorge Lara Castro (born 1945), Paraguayan lawyer, sociologist and diplomat
- Jorge Luis Lara Aguilar (born 1954), Mexican politician, deputy attorney-general
- Jorge Alberto Lara Rivera (1966–2024), Mexican politician
- Jorge A. Lara, screenplay author of 2013 Spanish adventure film Zip & Zap and the Marble Gang, nominated for 28th Goya Awards
- Jorge Cerdán Lara (1897–1958), Mexican politician, governor of Veracruz

== See also ==
- Jorge and Lara, participants of 2011 Spanish reality show Gran Hermano (Spain) All Stars 2011
