= Jorge Jiménez =

Jorge Jiménez may refer to:

- Jorge Jiménez (Chilean politician) (born 1944), Chilean Christian Democrat politician
- Jorge Jiménez (archer) (born 1967), El Salvador archer
- Jorge Franco Jiménez (born 1943), Mexican politician
- Jorge Jiménez Cantú (1914–2005), Mexican physician and politician
- Jorge Volio Jiménez (1882–1955), Costa Rican priest, soldier and politician
