= Jorge Cárdenas =

Jorge Cárdenas may refer to:

- Jorge de Cárdenas y Manrique de Lara, 4th Duke of Maqueda (1584–1644), Spanish military leader and statesman
- Jorge de Cárdenas (1933–1989), Cuban Olympic sailor in 1952, 1956 and 1960
- Jorge Godoy Cárdenas (born 1954), Mexican legislator with Citizens' Movement
- Jorge Luis Mendoza Cárdenas, Mexican leader of 2000s and 2010s criminal cartel, a/k/a La Garra
- Jorge Cárdenas (weightlifter) (born 1997), Mexican Summer Olympian in 2020
