= Jorge Luís =

- Gender: Male

Origin
- Region of origin: Portuguese

Jorge Luís (Portuguese) or Jorge Luis (Spanish) is a given name. Notable people with the name include:

== Footballers ==
- Jorge Luís Brochado Pereira (1958–2024), Brazilian footballer
- Jorge Luiz Matheus de Almeida (born 1965), Brazilian footballer
- Jorge Luis Campos (born 1970), Paraguayan footballer
- Jorge Luís dos Santos (born 1972), Brazilian footballer
- Jorge Luís Andrade da Silva, (born 1975), Brazilian footballer
- Jorge Luiz dos Santos Dias, (born 1976), Brazilian footballer
- Jorge Luiz Pereira de Sousa, (born 1977), Brazilian footballer
- Jorge Luiz Barbosa Teixeira, (born 1999), Brazilian footballer

== Other ==
- Jorge Luis Borges, (1899-1986), Argentine writer
- Jorge Luis Sánchez, (born 1960), Cuban film director
- Jorge Luis Gonzalez (born 1964), Cuban boxer
- Jorge Luis Mancillas Ramírez Mexican jurist
- Jorge Luis Ochoa Vázquez, Colombian drug trafficker
