= Jorge Pérez =

Jorge Pérez may refer to:

- Jorge Pérez (alpine skier) (born 1961), Spanish alpine skier
- Jorge Pérez Concha, Ecuadorian historian, biographer, writer, and diplomat
- Jorge Pérez (cyclist) (born 1951), Cuban Olympic cyclist
- Jorge Pérez (dancer) (born 1964), American dancer, choreographer, educator, and director
- Jorge Perez Evelyn, Argentine actor
- Jorge Pérez (footballer) (born 1975), Spanish footballer
- Jorge Pérez Gacitúa (born 1895), Chilean businessman and politician
- Jorge Pérez Heredia, Puerto Rican politician
- Jorge Pérez (swimmer) (born 1972), Spanish Olympic swimmer
- Jorge Pérez Vento (born 1947), Cuban Olympic volleyball player
- Jorge Armando Pérez, Cuban humanitarian, author, and evangelist
- Jorge Iván Pérez (born 1990), Argentine footballer
- Jorge M. Pérez (born 1950), American real estate developer, art collector, and author
- Another name for Jorge Perry (1908-1946), Colombian marathon runner

== See also ==
- George Pérez (1954–2022), American comic book artist and writer
- George Perez (baseball) (1937–2022), American baseball pitcher
