= Jorge Fernández =

Jorge Fernández may refer to:

- Jorge Ariel Fernández (born 1982), Argentine association footballer who plays for FC Gossau
- Jorge Fernández Díaz (born 1950), Spanish minister of Home Affairs (2011–2016)
- Jorge Fernández Madinabeitia (born 1972), Spanish TV presenter and model. Former Mister Spain 1999
- Jorge Fernández Menéndez, Mexican journalist and radio presenter
- Jorge Fernández (athlete) (born 1987), Cuban discus thrower and 2008 Olympian
- Jorge Fernández (equestrian) (born 1968), Uruguayan Olympic equestrian
- Jorge Fernández Valcárcel (born 1989), Spanish volleyball player
- Jorge Fernández Lucas (born 1992), Spanish footballer
- Jorge Hugo Fernández (born 1942), Argentine footballer
- Jorge Fernandez (tennis coach) Ecuadorian-Canadian tennis coach

== See also ==
- Jorge Fernandes (disambiguation)
