= Jorge Cruz =

Jorge Cruz may refer to:

- Jorge Cruz (water polo) (1926–2003), Brazilian water polo player
- Jorge Cruz (footballer) (born 2000), Salvadoran football centre-back
- Jorge Cruz (artist) (fl. 2006–2013), American artist

== See also ==
- Jorge Cruz-Cruz (born 1966), Colombian football forward
- Jorge Cruise (born 1971), Mexican fitness trainer and author
