= Jorge Rodríguez =

Jorge Rodríguez may refer to:

== Arts and entertainment ==
- Jorge Rodriguez-Gerada (born 1966), Cuban-American artist
- Jorge Rodríguez (director), Venezuelan filmmaker
- Jorge Rodriguez (radio host) (1942–2010), Cuban-American radio talk show host, founder of SoFloRadio.com
- Jorge Luis Rodriguez, Puerto Rican artist

== Sports ==
=== Association football ===
- Jorge Rodríguez (footballer, born 1925) (1925–2010), Mexican footballer
- Jorge Rodríguez (footballer, born 1968) (1968–2024), Mexican footballer
- Jorge Rodríguez (footballer, born 1971), Salvadoran footballer
- Jorge Rodríguez (footballer, born 1977), Uruguayan footballer
- Jorge Rodríguez (footballer, born 1980), Spanish footballer
- Jorge Rodríguez (footballer, born 1985), Uruguayan footballer
- Jorge Rodríguez (footballer, born 1995), Argentine footballer
- Jorge Rodríguez (footballer, born 2001), Mexican football left-back for Atlas

=== Other sports ===
- Jorge Rodríguez (alpine skier) (born 1945), Spanish Olympic skier
- Jorge Rodríguez (gymnast) (born 1948), Cuban Olympic gymnast

== Others ==
- Jorge Rodríguez (Argentine politician) (born 1944), former cabinet chief of Argentina
- Jorge Rodriguez-Chomat (1945–2017), American state legislator and judge
- Jorge Rodriguez Beruff (born 1947), Puerto Rican historian
- José Gonzalo Rodríguez Gacha (1947–1989), Colombian drug lord
- Jorge Rodríguez-Novelo (born 1955), American bishop
- Jorge Enrique Rodríguez (born 1963), Colombian guerrilla leader
- Jorge Rodríguez (Venezuelan politician) (born 1965), former vice president of Venezuela
