= Jorge Reyes =

Jorge Reyes may refer to:

- Jorge Reyes (musician) (1952–2009), Mexican ambient electronic musician
- Jorge Reyes (Mexican actor) (1907–1985), Argentine-Mexican actor
- Jorge Reyes (Peruvian filmmaker) (born 1938), Lima, Peru
- Jorge Reyes (Venezuelan actor) (born 1971), Venezuelan actor and model
- Jorge Reyes (writer) (born 1972), Cuban-born, American author
- Jorge Reyes (baseball) (born 1987), American pitcher
- Jorge Reyes (footballer) (born 1991), Mexican footballer
- Jorge D. Reyes, American surgeon and academic

== See also ==
- George Reyes, Cuban-American businessman
- Jorge Reyes Oregón (born 1991), Mexican footballer
