= Jorge Gutierrez =

Jorge Gutiérrez may refer to:

- Jorge Gutiérrez (boxer) (born 1975), Cuban boxer
- Jorge Gutiérrez (animator) (born 1975), Mexican animator, painter, writer & director
- Jorge Gutiérrez (squash player) (born 1979), Argentinian squash player
- Jorge Gutiérrez (basketball) (born 1988), Mexican basketball player
- Jorge Gutiérrez (footballer) (born 1998), Panamanian footballer
- Jorge Gutiérrez (cyclist) (born 2002), Spanish cyclist
- Jorge Gutiérrez Vera, former president of Luz y Fuerza del Centro
