= Jorge Ruiz =

Jorge Ruiz may refer to:

- Jorge Ruiz (field hockey) (born 1958), field hockey player from Argentina
- Jorge Armando Ruiz (born 1989), Colombian racewalker
- Jorge Ruiz (Venezuelan footballer) (born 1989), Venezuelan footballer
- Jorge Ruiz (Mexican footballer) (1928–2013), Mexican footballer
- Jorge Ruiz Cabestany (born 1956), Spanish racing cyclist
- Jorge Ruiz Ojeda (born 1995), Spanish footballer
