= Jorginho (footballer, born May 1998) =

Portuguese footballer

Personal information
- Full name: Jorge Nunes Sampaio
- Date of birth: 19 May 1998 (age 28)
- Place of birth: Guimarães, Portugal
- Height: 1.75 m (5 ft 9 in)
- Position: Left back

Team information
- Current team: Fafe
- Number: 75

Youth career
- 2008–2017: Vitória Guimarães

Senior career*
Years	Team	Apps	(Gls)
2017-2020	Vitória Guimarães B	24	(0)
2017-2018	Vitória Guimarães	0	(0)
2020-	Fafe	7	(0)
- * Club domestic league appearances and goals as of 30 January 2021

Jorge Nunes Sampaio (born 19 May 1998), known as Jorginho, is a Portuguese professional footballer who plays for Fafe as a defender.

== Club career ==
On 22 October 2017, Sampaio made his professional debut with Vitória Guimarães B in a 2017–18 LigaPro match against Santa Clara.
