= Paulo Jorge =

Paulo Jorge may refer to:

- Paulo Teixeira Jorge (1934–2010), Foreign Minister of Angola from 1976 to 1984
- Paulo Jorge (footballer, born 1963), Portuguese football forward
- Paulo Jorge (footballer, born 1970), Angolan football goalkeeper
- Paulo Jorge (footballer, born 1980), Portuguese football defender
- Paulo Jorge (footballer, born 1981), Portuguese football midfielder
- Paulo Jorge (footballer, born 1993), Portuguese football midfielder
