= Jorge Gomes =

Jorge Gomes may refer to:

- Jorge Gomes (politician) (born 1951), Portuguese politician and businessman
- Jorge Gomes (footballer) (born 1954), Brazilian football striker
- Jorge Gomes (swimmer) (born 1972), Angolan swimmer
- Jorge Gomes Mangrinha A.S.C. Huambo, Angolan football club also known as JGM

== See also ==
- Jorge Gómez (disambiguation)
- Jorge Vieira (footballer, born 1898), Jorge Gomes Vieira, Portuguese football left-back
