= Jorge Herrera =

Jorge Herrera may refer to:

- Jorge Herrera (swimmer) (born 1972), Puerto Rican freestyle swimmer
- Jorge Herrera (footballer) (born 1982), Colombian footballer
- Jorge Herrera (musician) Ecuadorian lead vocalist for the American punk band the Casualties 1990–2017
- Jorge Herrera, Panamanian politician, president of the National Assembly since July 2025
- Jorge Herrera Delgado (1961–2014), Mexican politician
- Jorge Herrera Caldera (born 1963), Mexican politician
