= Jorge Ramos =

Jorge Ramos may refer to:

- Jorge Ramos (wrestler) (born 1949), Cuban Olympic wrestler
- Jorge L. Ramos (born 1950), news anchor for Telemundo, New York
- Jorge Ramos (news anchor) (born 1958), Mexican-American news anchor for Noticiero Univision
- Jorge Ramos Peña (born 1961), Puerto Rican politician
- Jorge Ramos Hernández (born 1968), municipal president of Tijuana
- Jorge Ramos (Brazilian footballer) (born 1978), Brazilian football manager and former striker
- Jorge Luis Ramos (born 1992), Colombian football forward
- Jorge Ramos (commentator) (fl. 1998-present), Uruguayan association football commentator for ESPN Deportes
