= Jorge Ruiz (Venezuelan footballer) =

Venezuelan footballer (born 1989)

Personal information
- Full name: Jorge Luis Ruiz Sandoval
- Date of birth: 1 October 1989 (age 37)
- Place of birth: Guasdualito, Venezuela
- Height: 1.85 m (6 ft 1 in)
- Position: Forward

Senior career*
Years	Team	Apps	(Gls)
	El Vigía	12	
	Yaracuyanos	9	(4)
	Angostura	14	(7)
	CD San Antonio	19	(11)
2012–2013	Tucanes	11	(1)
2013–2014	Poli Timișoara	2	(0)
2015	Trujillanos FC	4	(0)
2015–2016	Monagas SC	16	(11)
2016–2017	Estudiantes de Mérida	15	(3)
2017	Metropolitanos	0	(0)
2017	Limón	7	(4)
- * Club domestic league appearances and goals as of 13 August 2017

Jorge Luis Ruiz Sandoval (born 1 octubre 1989) is a Venezuelan professional footballer as a forward who most recently played for Limón.

== Career ==
Ruiz made his Liga I debut playing for Poli Timișoara on 19 July 2013 in a match against Dinamo București.
