= Jorge Ariel Fernández =

Argentine footballer

Personal information
- Full name: Jorge Ariel Fernández Gerez
- Date of birth: March 9, 1982 (age 44)
- Place of birth: Lomas de Zamora, Argentina
- Height: 1.82 m (6 ft 0 in)
- Position: Midfielder

Senior career*
Years	Team	Apps	(Gls)
2001–2006	Banfield	0	(0)
2006–2007	Rangers de Talca		
2007	Carabobo		
2007–2009	FC Gossau	29	(2)
2010–2011	Jumilla		
2011–2012	Pinatar		
2012–2013	Manzanares CF		
2013–2014	Atlético San Jorge		
2014–2017	UAI Urquiza	13	(0)
- * Club domestic league appearances and goals as of 2017

Jorge Ariel Fernández Gerez (born 9 March 1982 in Lomas de Zamora) is an Argentine footballer.
