= Jorge García (footballer, born 1969) =

Argentine footballer

Personal information
- Date of birth: 11 November 1969 (age 56)
- Place of birth: Buenos Aires, Argentina
- Height: 1.84 m (6 ft 0 in)
- Position: Forward

Senior career*
Years	Team	Apps	(Gls)
–1991	Deportivo Español		
1991–1992	Wisła Kraków	3	(0)
- * Club domestic league appearances and goals

Jorge García (born 11 November 1969) is an Argentine former professional footballer who played as forward.

== Club career ==
In the summer of 1991, García joined Polish top division side Wisła Kraków. He made his league debut in a 3–3 draw against Górnik Zabrze on 28 July 1991. Representing the club during the 1991–92 season, he made three league appearances without any goal scored.
