= Jorge Bonaldi =

Uruguayan singer, composer and guitarist (born 1949)

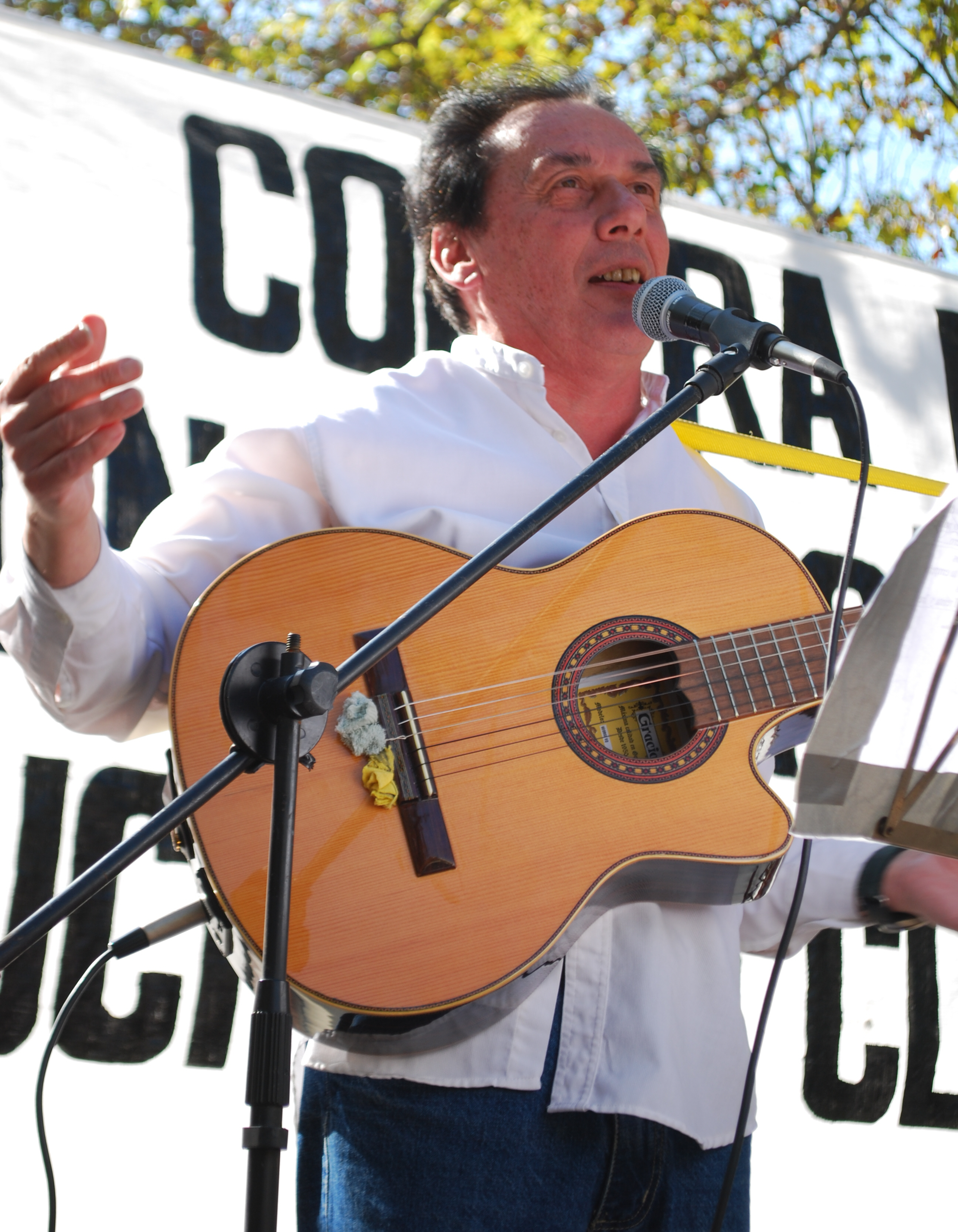
Bonaldi in 2009

Jorge Bonaldi (born June 28, 1949 in Montevideo) is a Uruguayan guitarist, singer, composer of popular music and music journalist. He is known for his involvement in the musical collective Canciones para no dormir la siesta, which also included figures such as Jorge Galemire.
