= Jorge Fernandes =

Jorge Fernandes may refer to:

- Jorge Fernandes (swimmer) (born 1962), Brazilian Olympic swimmer
- Jorge Fernandes (footballer, born 1997), Portuguese footballer
- Mário Jorge (footballer) (Mário Jorge da Silva Pinho Fernandes; born 1961), Portuguese footballer
- Silas (Portuguese footballer) (Jorge Manuel Rebelo Fernandes, born 1976)
- Joca (footballer, born 1996) (Jorge Samuel Figueiredo Fernandes), Portuguese footballer
- Jotamont (Jorge Fernandes Monteiro, 1912–1988), Cape Verdean musician

== See also ==
- George Fernandes, political activist and journalist
- Jorge Fernández (disambiguation)
