= Mário Jorge =

Mário Jorge may refer to:

- Mário Jorge (basketball) (1926-2019), Brazilian basketball player
- Mário Jorge (footballer) (born 1961), Portuguese footballer
- Mário Jorge (football manager) (born 1978), Brazilian football manager
