= Jorge Torres Palacios =

Mexican journalist

Jorge Torres Palacios was a Mexican journalist and government spokesman who was murdered in 2014. At the time of his death he was a columnist for the Acapulco newspaper El Dictamen and for other local news media, including the website Libertad Guerrero Noticias. He was also a spokesman for the Acapulco municipal health department.

In its report on the Torres murder, the Spanish daily El País noted that 32 journalists had been killed in Mexico during the preceding four years.

== Early life and education ==
He was born in Guerrero. He was a student from 1985 to 1988 at the School of Communication Sciences and Journalism of the Faculty of Political and Social Sciences (FCPyS) of the National Autonomous University of Mexico (UNAM).

His father was Tomás Torres Abarca; his brother, Juan Torres Palacios, was a professor at Instituto Tecnológico de Acapulco; and his cousin Juan Torres Miranda was the agent of the Judicial Police assigned to Coyuca de Benítez. All three men were murdered in 2001, probably by a drug-cartel hit man.

== Career ==
During the administration of Governor René Juárez Cisneros (1999-2005), he was the nightly news anchorman on Guerrero Radio and Television, where he also served as head of information.

Torres was spokesman for Social Communication of the state government in Acapulco during the administration of Governor Zeferino Torreblanca Galindo (2005-2011). From this job, he moved on to a position as spokesman for the Acapulco municipal health department as the coordinator of Social Communication of the Municipal Health Directorate. He worked at this job for two years and was still doing so at the time of his death.

While holding these positions as government spokesperson, Torres continued to work as a journalist. He wrote a weekly column on politics and security, titled "Nothing Personal", for El Dictamen, an Acapulco newspaper. He also contributed to a local news website, Libertad Guerrero Noticias, as well as other local news media.

After Torres's death, there was much discussion in the media about the possibility that the motive for his killing was related to his political world. Torres, according to Reporters without Borders, “frequently addressed in his articles the issue of insecurity in the region.” In one of his last columns, for instance, he commented on the protests in Chilpancingo, the capital of Guerrero, against police abuses.” In other columns he also denounced arbitrary arrests, beatings, extortion, and kidnappings by local police, federal officials, and armed forces.

The Committee to Protect Journalists similarly noted that “Torres had written several columns critical of local officials shortly before his death.” For example, in his final column for El Dictamen, published shortly after his abduction, “Torres criticized the mayor of Chilpancingo, capital of Guerrero state, accusing him of putting personal political ambition ahead of problems such as crime and corruption.” Earlier, in March, he had written in Libertad Guerrero Noticias that he “accused a state senator of putting gubernatorial plans ahead of congressional work.” In another March column for Libertad Guerrero Noticias, Torres “criticized the son of current Guerrero Governor Ángel Aguirre, who the journalist alleged wanted to run for mayor of Acapulco.”

One source noted that in his last column, Torres “described painted bed sheets decrying political and police corruption hung from pedestrian bridges in Chilpancingo, the capital of Guerrero,” and criticized Mario Moreno Arcos, mayor of that city, “accusing him of neglecting duties to his constituents while striving to advance his political career.”

Many of Torres's articles were so critical of the government that, because he was a government employee, he signed with an alias, “Serpico.”

== Murdered family ==
Three members of Torres's family were murdered in January 2001 at a village called Kilómetro 30. The victims were his father, Tomás Torres Abarca; his brother, Juan Torres Palacios; and his cousin, Juan Torres Miranda. All three died in a shoot-out in which Torres himself was wounded, as were his brothers Salvador and Carlos. Jose Isabel Flores Arizmendi, known as “El Chabelo,” was suspected of the murders and was arrested in Manzanillo, Colima; relatives of the victims said that he was the main hit man for drug trafficker Abel Arizmendi Flores, who was killed with his son Abel Arizmendi Diaz 48 hours after the shootout. “El Chabelo” told Criminal Court Luis Aguilar Delgado that he had not shot anyone. He said that there had been an argument at New Year's Eve dance in Kilometer 30, and that Jorge Torres had started the shooting. Fernando Torres Palacios, another brother of Jorge Torres, told the judge that Flores Arizmendi was an extremely dangerous man who had been the “executive arm” of Abel Arizmendi Flores and had been “responsible for doing all the drug dealer's dirty work.”

A year after the murder of the three Torres family members, it was reported that “investigations remain stalled, impunity prevails, anxiety persists and there is distrust in the application of justice” because the ballistics testing and photos contributed as evidence to support investigation research on the event were lost, stated survivors of the shoot-out. Complaints were made about the “passivity of the authorities.” Fernando Torres Palacios complained “that there has been strong resistance within the State Attorney's and Attorney General's Office to clarify the facts and issue arrest warrants against those who participated in the slaughter.”

== Kidnapping and murder ==
Upon arriving at his home, at an Acapulco apartment house, El Coloso, at about 7:30 p.m. on May 29, Torres was abducted by 12 armed men, who reportedly demanded no ransom.

Members of the news media, along with friends and relatives of Torres, held a protest on June 1 in the park of La Reyna de Acapulco Guerrero. They demanded that the authorities provide information about their efforts to locate Torres and criticized authorities for the lack of action of the State Attorney General to conduct investigations.

His decapitated body was found on June 2 in a bag in a village garden in Plan de los Amantes, on the outskirts of Acapulco, in the state of Guerrero. His remains were taken to the office of the Medical Examiner, where his children later identified him. There were no bullet wounds and it was determined the cause of death was suffocation.

=== Reactions ===
At Torres’ funeral, two days after his body was discovered, local journalists called for justice for their colleague. “We don’t ask for justice, we demand it — that this abominable murder be brought to light, because Jorge did not deserve it,” Pablo Martín Obregón, Televisa correspondent and union spokesperson, said. Torres’ son Jorge Luis Torres Gallardo said, “I ask for justice. It doesn’t matter to me who did it nor why. All I ask is that the authorities conduct an investigation and resolve the case. That’s all I ask.”

On June 5, PEN Mexico expressed its support for the Guerro journalists who were demanding open investigations into the murder, calling the murder of Torres and other Mexican broadcasters “a direct attack on freedom of expression in this country.” Reporters Without Borders expressed mourning over the murder of Torres and called on the Special Prosecutor for Attention to Crimes against Freedom of Expression to open an investigation at once into the murder Torres and should not discount the possible relationship of the crime to Torres's professional activity.

The Director-General of UNESCO, Irina Bokova, also condemned Torres's murder. “I urge the authorities to investigate this crime and bring its perpetrators to justice,” she said. “They must send a clear message to criminals that using violence to intimidate and kill journalists so as to silence informed debate within civil society will not be tolerated.”

The members of the 1985-88 class of the School of Communication Sciences and Journalism of the Faculty of Political and Social Sciences (FCPyS) of the National Autonomous University of Mexico (UNAM), expressed “outrage” at the kidnapping and murder of Torres, their classmate.

=== Motive ===
According to the Committee to Protect Journalists, “some local journalists...did not think Torres' murder was in relation to his work,” while “other local journalists criticized official statements and press releases in which, they said, authorities referred only to Torres' government position and did not acknowledge his work as a journalist.”

=== SEIDO involvement ===
On June 7, the case was officially turned over to SEIDO, the organized crime division of the federal Attorney General's office, because state investigators had reportedly received threats from organized crime figures that warned them not to dig too deep into the case. The Guerrero state attorney general stated that authorities were investigating a possible organized-crime link.

== Personal life ==
Torres and Martha Helguera had a son, Jorge.
