= Jorge Hernández =

Jorge Hernández may refer to:

- Jorge Hernández (cyclist) (born 1948), Colombian Olympic cyclist
- Jorge Hernández (boxer) (1954–2019), retired boxer from Cuba
- Jorge Hernández (sailor) (born 1965), Puerto Rican Olympic sailor
- Jorge Hernández Hernández (born 1965), Mexican politician
- Jorge Luis Hernández (born 1978), Cuban volleyball player
- Jorge Hernández (footballer, born 1988), Mexican football midfielder
- Jorge Hernández (footballer, born 1989), Mexican football midfielder
- Jorge Hernandez (footballer, born 1992), Spanish winger
- Jorge Hernandez (soccer, born 2000), Mexican soccer player
