= Patricio Castañeda =

Chilean footballer (born 1986)

Personal information
- Full name: Patricio Sebastián Castañeda Muñoz
- Date of birth: 2 February 1986 (age 40)
- Place of birth: Santiago, Chile
- Height: 1.80 m (5 ft 11 in)
- Position: Defender

Senior career*
Years	Team	Apps	(Gls)
2009–2010	Cobreloa	16	(0)
2011	Dep. Antofagasta	3	(0)
- * Club domestic league appearances and goals as of 18 March 2020

Patricio Sebastián Castañeda Muñoz (born 2 February 1986) is a Chilean association football player.

== Career ==
He played for the lower divisions of C.D. Cobreloa, joining the club in 2004 and making his debut against C.D. Palestino in 2005. In 2006, he played for Cobreloa's "B" subsidiary in the Tercera A league. He played for Cobreloa in the Primera División for 16 games in 2009 and 2010.

In 2011, he was loaned to Deportes Antofagasta in the second-tier Primera B league. He played in two games of the 2011 Torneo Apertura, which the team won, and one game of the 2011 Torneo Clausura, where the team came in third place. The combined performances in the two tournaments earned the team the 2011 Annual Primera B league championship.
