= Jorge Aguirre =

Jorge Aguirre may refer to

- Jorge Aguirre (athlete) (1925–2005), Mexican Olympic athlete
- Jorge Aguirre (author), children's author
- Jorge Aguirre (judoka) (born 1962), Argentine Olympic judoka
- Jorge Aguirre (footballer, born 1987), Colombian footballer
- Jorge Aguirre (footballer, born 2000), Cuban footballer
