= Jorge Díaz =

Jorge Díaz may refer to:

- Jorge Díaz Cruz (1914–1998), associate justice of the Puerto Rico Supreme Court
- Jorge Díaz (boxer) (fl. 1928), Chilean Olympic boxer
- Jorge Díaz Serrano (1921–2011), Mexican politician and engineer
- Jorge Díaz Gutiérrez (1930–2007), Chilean playwright, National Prize for Performing and Audiovisual Arts
- Jorge Díaz Reverón (born 1960), Puerto Rican judge, first gentleman of Puerto Rico
- Jorge Díaz Cortés (born 1962), one of three writers writing as Carmen Mola
- Jorge Manuel Díaz (born 1966), Argentine footballer
- Jorge Diaz (American football) (born 1973), American football offensive tackle
- Jorge Díaz (footballer, born 1977), Colombian footballer
- Jorge Díaz Ibarra (born 1982), Chilean lawyer and politician
- Jorge Diaz (actor) (born 1983), American actor
- Jorge Díaz de León (born 1984), Mexican football goalkeeper
- Jorge Díaz (sport shooter) (born 1985), Spanish sports shooter
- Jorge Díaz (footballer, born 1989), Uruguayan footballer
- Jorge Díaz (basketball) (born 1989), Puerto Rican basketball player
- Jorge Díaz (footballer, born 1998), Mexican footballer
