= Jorge Varela =

Jorge Varela may refer to:

- Jorge Varela (environmentalist), environmentalist from Honduras
- Jorge Alcocer Varela (born 1946), Mexican immunologist and researcher
- Jorge Varela (kickboxer) (born 1994), Spanish kickboxer
