= Jorge Gómez =

Jorge Gómez may refer to:

- Jorge Gómez (cyclist) (born 1956), Cuban cyclist
- Jorge Gómez Baillo (born 1959), Argentine chess player
- Jorge Gómez (footballer) (born 1968), Chilean footballer

== See also ==
- Jorge Gomes (disambiguation)
