= Maureen Castaneda =

American businesswoman

Maureen Castaneda was the director of Foreign Exchange and Sovereign Risk Management for Enron Corporation.

== Enron story ==
Maureen Castaneda was laid off from Enron and took a box of shredded paper home to use as packing material. She then realized that the papers meant that Enron employees were illegally destroying evidence. She stated the shredding started in 2001 around Thanksgiving. The shredded papers were marked with Chewco and Jedi, two questionable partners of Enron. The New York Times, along with other news outlets, depicted her claim as a "woman scandal".

Castenada said the documents were shredded in the accounting office starting sometime in October until January when she left the company. On January 22, 2002 she stated that Enron had been shredding documents in its Houston headquarters the previous week. Following her claim, the FBI raided the Houston office of Enron the next day to investigate the allegations.
