= Jorge Enrique Rodríguez =

Colombian guerrilla leader

Jorge Enrique Rodríguez Mendieta, also known by his nom de guerre Iván Vargas (born c. 1963), is a Colombian guerrilla leader member of the Revolutionary Armed Forces of Colombia (FARC-EP), former commander of the 24th Front of the Middle Magdalena Bloc of the FARC-EP. Vargas was arrested in late 2004 in the city of Bucaramanga by Colombian authorities and extradited to the United States on 3 November 2007 on charges of narcotrafficking.

== Early years ==
Vargas began his activities with the FARC in 1987 as an aide of the FARC's Secretariat and in 1989 military intelligence of the Colombian Army reported that Vargas was a guerrilla instructor in the Escuela Nacional de Cuadros de las FARC (a guerrilla training school of the FARC) in Casa Verde. In 1991 Vargas was made guerrilla commander of the 22nd Front of the FARC-EP, part of the Eastern Bloc of that organization. He was also a member of the Estado Mayor, the FARC's operational leadership council.

== Vietnam training and commander ==
The following year, in 1992 Vargas was sent to Vietnam to receive training in guerrilla tactics and ordnance and explosives training. Upon his return he was made commander of the 24th Front of the FARC-EP and commander of the Middle Magdalena region, guerrilla unit that operates in the southern region of Bolívar Department. According to the Colombian Army, Vargas had also received training in the former Soviet Union.

== Capture and extradition to the United States ==
Vargas was extradited to the United States by the Government of Colombia charged with conspiracy to export illegal drugs from Colombia to the United States. In Colombia, the government charged him with rebellion, terrorism, conspiracy to export illegal drugs According to the United States Attorney General's Office Rodriguez Mendieta allegedly directed the purchase of hundreds of thousands of kilograms of cocaine paste and transmitted billions of Colombian pesos in cocaine proceeds to other FARC officials. Rodriguez Mendieta is also alleged to have ordered the murder of at least eight farmers, including several whom he personally dismembered alive, and to have plotted to retaliate against United States law enforcement officers who were conducting the narcotics-trafficking investigation

Jorge Enrique Rodriguez Mendieta (a.k.a. Ivan Vargas) was arrested by Colombian authorities in late 2004 and extradited to the U.S. in November 2007. On 16 December 2009, he pleaded guilty in a Washington, D.C. federal court to conspiring to import large quantities of cocaine into the U.S.

When submitting his guilty plea, Mendieta admitted that he had directed other FARC members to purchase hundreds of thousands of kilograms of cocaine paste, some of which was imported to the U.S. The U.S. government has also alleged that Mendieta plotted to retaliate against American law enforcement officers conducting the narcotics-trafficking investigation that ultimately led to the charges filed against him.
