= Jorge López =

Jorge López may refer to:

== Sports ==
- Jorge López (baseball) (born 1993), Puerto Rican baseball player
- Jorge Oscar López (born 1960), Argentinian Olympic boxer
- Jorge López (rower) (born 1943), Cuban Olympic rower
- Jorge López (footballer, born 1981) (born 1981), Colombian footballer
- Jorge López (footballer, born 1957) (born 1957), Mexican footballer
- Jorge López Marco (born 1978), Spanish footballer, nicknamed Tote
- Jorge López (footballer, born 1978) (born 1978), Spanish former footballer
- Jorge López (born 1992), Ecuadorian footballer with C.D. Olmedo and Club Deportivo Municipal Cañar

== Other ==
- Jorge López aka Giro (singer), Puerto Rican salsa and pop singer who was a member of boy band Los Chicos
- Jorge López (composer) (born 1955), Cuban-Austrian composer
- Jorge López (physicist) (born 1955), U.S. physicist and educator
- Jorge López Bain (1939–2020), Chilean civil engineer and politician
- Jorge López Orozco (born 1976), Mexican convicted murderer
- Jorge Julio López (1929–), Argentinian bricklayer who disappeared after testifying in trial against Dirty War criminal Miguel Etchecolatz
- Jorge Manuel López (1918–2006), bishop
- Jorge López Pérez, Mexican suspected drug lord
- Jorge López (actor) (born 1991), Chilean actor
- Jorge Rivera López (1930–2024), Argentine actor
- Jorge Torres López (born 1954), Mexican politician
