= Jorge Delgado =

Jorge Delgado may refer to:

- Jorge Delgado (footballer, born 1975), Uruguayan football striker
- Jorge Delgado (footballer, born 1991), Jorge Mota Faial Delgado, Cape Verdean football goalkeeper
- Jorge Delgado (footballer, born 2002), Jorge Delgado Caballero, Spanish football forward
- Jorge Delgado (swimmer) (born 1954), Ecuadorian former swimmer
- Jorge Delgado Fidalgo (born 1992), known as Ito, Spanish football striker
