= Jorge Torres (footballer) =

Peruvian footballer (born 1999)

Personal information
- Full name: Jorge Alejandro Torres Bohórquez
- Date of birth: 26 July 1999 (age 27)
- Place of birth: Lima, Peru
- Height: 1.80 m (5 ft 11 in)
- Position: Left-back

Youth career
- Deportivo Municipal

Senior career*
Years	Team	Apps	(Gls)
2019–2021	Deportivo Municipal	21	(0)
2021	→ Comerciantes (loan)	9	(0)
- * Club domestic league appearances and goals as of 18:19, 5 December 2021 (UTC)

Jorge Alejandro Torres Bohórquez (born 26 July 1999) is a Peruvian footballer who plays as a left-back.

== Career ==
=== Club career ===
Torres spent his whole youth career at Deportivo Municipal. In October 2017, Torres made his debut for the clubs reserve team.

In 2019, he was promoted to the first team squad and on 14 July 2019, 19-year old Torres got his official debut for Municipal in the Peruvian Primera División against FBC Melgar. Torres started on the bench, before replacing Aron Torres after 73 minutes. Torres made a total of five appearances in the 2019 season.

On 1 February 2021, he joined Segunda División club Comerciantes Unidos on loan for the rest of 2021. He was left without contract at the end of 2021.
