= Jorge Suárez =

Jorge Suárez may refer to:

- Jorge Suárez (field hockey) (born 1942), Argentine Olympic hockey player
- Jorge Suárez Cáceres (born 1976), Puerto Rican politician
- Jorge Suárez (footballer) (1945–1997), soccer player from El Salvador
- Jorge A. Suárez (1927-1985), Argentinian linguist
