= Jorge Muñoz =

Jorge Muñoz may refer to:

- Jorge Munoz (American football) (born 1971)
- Jorge Muñoz de Closets (fl. 1950s), Chilean politician
- Jorge Muñoz (Colombian politician) (born 1964)
- Jorge Muñoz Cristi (1898–1967), Chilean geologist
- Jorge Muñoz (footballer, born 1961), Chilean footballer
- Jorge Muñoz (footballer, born 1981), Chilean footballer
- Jorge Muñoz Wells (born 1962), Peruvian politician
- Michi Munoz (Jorge Michael Muñoz, born 1981), Mexican-born American professional boxer
