= Jorge Luís (footballer, born 1976) =

Brazilian footballer

Personal information
- Full name: Jorge Luís dos Santos Dias
- Date of birth: 11 February 1976 (age 50)
- Place of birth: Rio de Janeiro, Brazil
- Height: 1.78 m (5 ft 10 in)
- Position: Left back

Senior career*
Years	Team	Apps	(Gls)
1996–2000	Fluminense	37	(2)
2001–2002	Santa Cruz	20	(2)
2002–2003	Varzim	19	(1)
2003–2005	Braga	69	(1)
2006–2007	Dynamo Moscow	6	(0)
2007	→ Braga (loan)	4	(0)
2007–2008	Internacional	5	(0)
2008	Porto Alegre	0	(0)
2008	CRB	1	(0)
2009–2010	Trofense	14	(0)
Total		175	(6)
- * Club domestic league appearances and goals

Jorge Luís dos Santos Dias (born 11 February 1976) is a Brazilian retired footballer who played as a left back.

== Club career ==
Born in Rio de Janeiro, Jorge Luís started his career at local Fluminense Football Club, playing with the team through consecutive relegations to the Série B and Série C. In 2001, he moved to Santa Cruz Futebol Clube in the Série A, in a season that ended with club's relegation.

In August 2002, Luís left for Portugal and signed for Varzim SC, suffering yet another relegation. The following year, he stayed in the north of the country, joining fellow Primeira Liga club S.C. Braga.

During his 2 1/2-season spell in Minho, Jorge Luís was a regular starter, as the team achieved two fifth positions and one fourth, with the subsequent UEFA Cup qualifications. In January 2006, he moved to FC Dynamo Moscow in Russia for €3 million and Nuno Frechaut, as the side signed several Portuguese or Portugal-based players during that period (Danny, Derlei, Maniche, etc.). After just six Premier League games, however, he returned to his previous club on loan.

In July 2007, Luís returned to his country and joined Sport Club Internacional, signing a one-year contract. In May of the following year, he signed for Porto Alegre Futebol Clube in the Rio Grande do Sul State League (second division). In August, he moved teams again, signing with Clube de Regatas Brasil but left after only one second level appearance.

In late October 2009, after one year out of football, 33-year-old Luís returned to Portugal and joined C.D. Trofense in the Liga de Honra. He retired at the end of the season, aged 34.

== Honours ==
- Campeonato Brasileiro Série C: 1999
