= Jorge Salinas (disambiguation) =

Jorge Salinas is a Mexican actor.

It might also refer to:

- Jorge Salinas (Paraguayan footballer) (born 1992), Paraguayan footballer
- Jorge Salinas (Spanish footballer) (born 2007), Spanish footballer
