= Jorge González =

Jorge González may refer to:

== Arts ==
- Jorge González Bastías (1879–1950), Chilean poet and politician, winner of the 1934 Santiago Municipal Literature Award
- Jorge González Camarena (1908–1980), Mexican muralist, painter and sculptor
- Jorge González (musician) (born 1964), lead singer of Chilean rock group Los Prisioneros
  - Jorge González (album), his self-titled solo album (1993)
- Jorge González Reyna (1920–1969), Mexican architect, killed when Mexicana de Aviación Flight 704 crashed
- Jorge Gonzalez, better known as Siddhartha (musician), soloist rock musician
- Jorge González (singer) (born 1988), Spanish singer

== Politics ==
- Jorge González Otero (born 1957), Puerto Rican politician and mayor of Jayuya
- Jorge González Torres (born 1942), Mexican politician
- Jorge González von Marées (1900–1962), Chilean political figure and author
- Jorge Emilio González Martínez (born 1972), Mexican politician
- Jorge Soler González (born 1975), Spanish politician

== Sports ==
- Jorge González (Puerto Rican runner) (born 1952), Puerto Rican marathon runner
- Jorge González (Spanish runner) (born 1945), Spanish Olympic athlete
- Jorge González (volleyball, born 1991), Puerto Rican beach volleyball player
- Jorge González (volleyball, born 1982), Colombian volleyball player
- Jorge González, known as Mágico González (born 1958), Salvadoran football (soccer) player
- Jorge González Díaz, known as Yordi (born 1974), Spanish football (soccer) player
- Jorge González (wrestler) (1966–2010), professional basketball player and wrestler known as "Giant González" and "El Gigante"
- Jorge Luis González (born 1964), Cuban former heavyweight boxer
- Jorge González (referee), Major League Soccer (MLS) referee
- Jorge González (chess player), Colombian chess player, see Colombian Chess Championship
- Jorge González (sport shooter) (born 1957), Spanish Olympic sport shooter
- Jorge González (Paraguayan football manager), manager of Deportivo Recoleta
- Jorge González (Uruguayan football manager), former manager of Cerro, Progreso and Tacuarembó
- Jorge González (swimmer) (born 1949), Puerto Rican swimmer
- Jorge González (Argentine footballer) (born 1988), Argentine football striker
- Jorge González (Paraguayan footballer) (born 1988), Paraguayan football midfielder
- Jorge Gonzalez (footballer, born 1998), Spanish footballer
