= Jorge Gutiérrez Vera =

Mexican engineer and businessman

Jorge Gutiérrez Vera is the former director of Luz y Fuerza del Centro. Holds a degree in electrical engineering at the Instituto Politécnico Nacional and holds an MA in Energy Saving Systems from Universidad Anáhuac. He took various courses in Electrical and Electronic Engineering at Heriott-Watt University in Edinburgh, Scotland.

== His career ==
- He was Director General of the firm called International Energy System in Monterrey (2001-2006).
- He has been president and founder of various firms in the private electricity sector such as Energía del Siglo 21 and Energy Works, in which prominent engineers, such as Jose Manuel Muñoz, Tomas Soto, and Oscar G. Shelly worked under his direction.
- He was also President and CEO of AGC Manufacturing Co., in Broken Arrow, Oklahoma.
- He served as Technical Advisor to the Energy Secretariat (1997-1999).
- He was Assistant Director General of Luz y Fuerza del Centro (1982-1992).
- He held various posts in the Federal Electricity Commission such as Engineering Planning Manager, Distribution Manager, Division Manager of the Central East Division of Puebla, Technical Assistant in the Central-South Division, Distribution Superintendent and Head of the Rates Office of the Northern Division (1966-1982).
- Since 1973, he has published several books on electricity and renewable energy use in Mexico.
- He has delivered speeches at several World Energy Congresses, and various seminars in the electricity sector.
