= Jorge Franco Jiménez =

Mexican politician

- Born: 6 December 1943 (age 82); Oaxaca, Oaxaca, Mexico
- Occupation: Politician
- Political party: PRI

Jorge Eduardo Franco Jiménez (born 6 December 1943) is a Mexican politician affiliated with the Institutional Revolutionary Party. He served as Senator of the LIX Legislature of the Mexican Congress representing Oaxaca as replacement of Ulises Ruiz Ortiz. He previously served as attorney general of the state of Oaxaca from 1998 to 2004.
