= Jorge Juan =

Jorge Juan may refer to:

== People ==
- Jorge Juan Crespo de la Serna (1887–1978), Mexican artist, art critic and art historian
- Jorge Juan y Santacilia (1713–1773), Spanish mathematician, scientist, naval officer, and mariner
- Jorge Juan Pelegrina Linares (born 1984), Spanish footballer
- Jorge Juan Torres Lopez (born 1954), Mexican politician

== Ships ==
- Spanish sloop Jorge Juan, a Spanish Navy screw sloop-of-war commissioned in 1877 that was sunk during the Spanish–American War in 1898
- Spanish destroyer Jorge Juan (1933) a Churruca-class destroyer of the Spanish Navy commissioned in 1937 and stricken in 1959
- Spanish destroyer Jorge Juan (D25), the former USS McGowan, acquired by the Spanish Navy in 1960 and scrapped in 1988

== Other uses ==
- Campo de Jorge Juan, home stadium of the Real Madrid football club, 1902–1912
