= Jorge Astiazarán Orcí =

Mexican politician

22nd Municipal president of Tijuana
- In office 2013–2016
- Preceded by: Carlos Bustamante Anchondo
- Succeeded by: Juan Manuel Gastélum

Personal details
- Born: June 4, 1962 (age 63) Los Angeles, California
- Party: PRI
- Spouse: Elia Manjarrez
- Profession: Doctor

Jorge Astiazarán Orcí is a Mexican politician, member of the Institutional Revolutionary Party and was the 23rd Mayor of Tijuana.

== Life before politics ==
Born in Los Angeles, California to an elite family, Astiazarán was born in the United States when his mother was visiting her father, who was a Mexican Consul in Los Angeles. His father was an accountant and started a chain of radio stations called Grupo Uniradio. Astiazaran's family first moved to Tijuana in the 1940s from the neighboring state of Sonora.
