= Jorge Castillo =

Jorge Castillo may refer to:

- Jorge Castillo (chef), Cuban-American chef and author
- Jorge Castillo (artist) (born 1933), Spanish surrealist painter and sculptor
- Jorge Castillo (rower) (born 1939), Mexican Olympic rower
- Jorge Castillo Cabrera (born 1946), Mexican politician
- Jorge Del Castillo (born 1950), Peruvian lawyer and politician
- Jorge Olivera Castillo (born 1961), Cuban poet and dissident
