= Jorge Pina =

Jorge Pina may refer to:

- Jorge Pina (fencer), Spanish sabre fencer
- Jorge Pina (footballer), Spanish footballer
- Jorge Pina (athlete), Portuguese paralympic marathon runner, see Portugal at the 2016 Summer Paralympics

== See also ==
- Jorge Pina Cabral, Portuguese bishop
