= Jorge Vargas =

Jorge Vargas may refer to:

- Jorge Vargas (basketball) (born 1942), Peruvian Olympic basketball player
- Jorge B. Vargas (1890–1980), Filipino lawyer and youth advocate
- Jorge Vargas (footballer, born 1976), Chilean football defender
- Jorge Vargas (footballer, born 1981), Ecuadorian football defender
- Jorge Vargas (footballer, born 1993), Guatemalan football midfielder
