= Fernando Jorge =

Fernando Jorge may refer to:

- Fernando Jorge (designer) (born 1979), Brazilian jewellery designer
- Fernando Jorge (canoeist) (born 1998), Cuban sprint canoeist

== See also ==
- Fernando Jorge Castro Trenti, Mexican politician
- Fernando Jorge Ferreira Pires (born 1969), Portuguese football manager of Angolan descent
