= Jorginho (footballer, born 25 January 1991) =

Brazilian footballer

Personal information
- Full name: Jorge Mesqueu Neto
- Date of birth: 25 January 1991 (age 35)
- Position: Midfielder

Senior career*
Years	Team	Apps	(Gls)
2012	Bangu	0	(0)
2013–2014	FC U Craiova 1948	2	(0)
2016–2017	Ħamrun Spartans	21	(3)
2018	PS Kemi	9	(0)
- * Club domestic league appearances and goals as of 12 January 2019

Jorge Mesqueu Neto (born 25 January 1991), known as Jorginho, is a Brazilian professional footballer who plays for Finnish club PS Kemi, as a midfielder.
