= Jorge Guerrero =

Jorge Guerrero may refer to:

- Jorge Guerrero (Mexican footballer) (born 1964), Mexican football manager and former midfielder
- Jorge Antonio Guerrero (born 1987), Mexican actor
- Jorge Guerrero (Paraguayan footballer) (born 1988), Paraguayan football forward
