= Jorge Guzmán =

Jorge Guzmán may refer to:

- Jorge Guzmán (baseball) (born 1996), Dominican baseball player
- Jorge Guzmán (footballer, born 1980), Chilean footballer
- Jorge Guzmán (footballer, born 2003), Mexican footballer
- Jorge Guzmán Montt (1879–1929), Chilean politician
- Jorge Guzmán (wrestler) (born 1963), Mexican luchador enmascarado known as El Hijo del Santo
- Jorge Guzmán Zepeda, Chilean politician
