= Jorge Luís (footballer, born 1972) =

Brazilian footballer

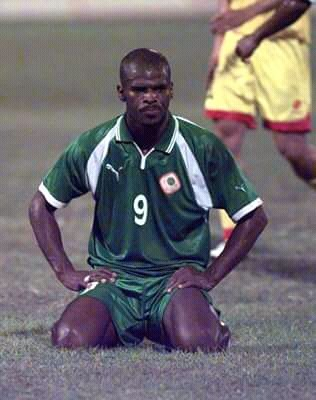
- 2001

Personal information
- Full name: Jorge Luís dos Santos
- Date of birth: 23 April 1972 (age 54)
- Place of birth: Palhoça, Brazil
- Height: 1.76 m (5 ft 9 1/2 in)
- Position: Forward

Youth career
- Avaí

Senior career*
Years	Team	Apps	(Gls)
1991	Avaí		
1991–1993	Al-Oruba		
1994–1995	Avaí		
1996	Sobradinho		
1996	FC Jazz	11	(2)
1997	Anápolis		
1998	Central		
1998	Porto-PE		
1998	União Lamas	12	(0)
1999	Leixões		
1999–2000	Moreirense	7	(0)
2000–2001	Leixões	17	(2)
2001	Valonguense		
2001–2002	Happy Valley		
2002–2003	Montalegre		
2003–2004	Monção		
- * Club domestic league appearances and goals

Jorge Luís dos Santos (born 23 April 1972 in Palhoça, Santa Catarina), known as Jorge Luís, is a Brazilian former footballer who played as a forward.
