= Jorge Armando Pérez =

Cuban humanitarian, author, and evangelist

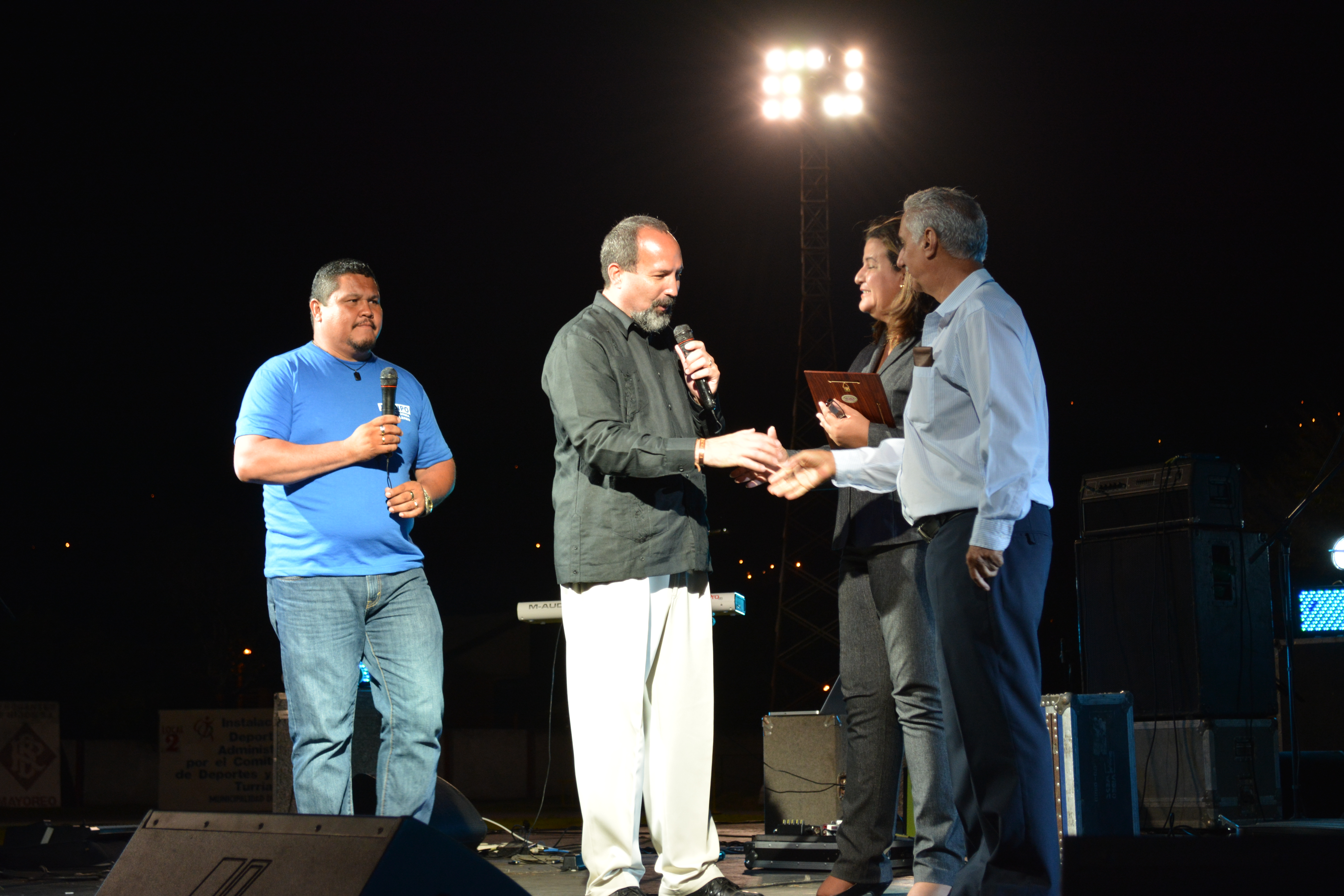
JA Pérez, joined by the Mayor of the City of Turrialba, Costa Rica, during his 2014 Republic of Joy Festival.

JA Pérez is a Cuban humanitarian, author, and evangelist. He has written more than 50 books under the JA Pérez name and 5 under the pseudonym of Jorge Armando Pérez Venâncio, taking the second last name of Venâncio, in honor of his grandfather, Francisco Venâncio.

== Early life ==
JA Pérez was born in a small village named El Gabriel, in the province of Havana, Cuba. He has two younger brothers. His father, Armando Pérez Martín, is a radiologist; his mother, Teresita Juana María Hernandez, is an English teacher and controller for an American tobacco company.

His twin younger brothers suffered from health problems as children, requiring frequent hospitalizations. Consequently, Pérez spent most of his childhood years under the care of his maternal grandparents, Francisco Venâncio Hernandez and Hilda Alfonso.

== Early influences ==
Pérez was influenced greatly by his grandfather Francisco, who was known in El Gabriel as "Pancho el Largo" (meaning "Tall Frank" in English). Francisco was a tall man, born and raised by monks in a monastery in the Canary Islands.

When Pérez was young, his grandfather would read him short stories and passages from an old Nacar Colunga Bible. By the time Pérez was five years old, he knew all of Aesop's Fables by heart.

== Humanitarian work ==
Pérez runs an organization which brings humanitarian campaigns to countries in Latin America. His team includes medical professionals, family counselors, and volunteers. The organization recently held a Humanitarian Festival in Costa Rica called the "Republic of Joy", with over 18,000 people in attendance. Teams of doctors and dentists worked during the day at the Rafael Ángel Camacho Cordero Stadium, providing care to low-income families.

== Mass events ==
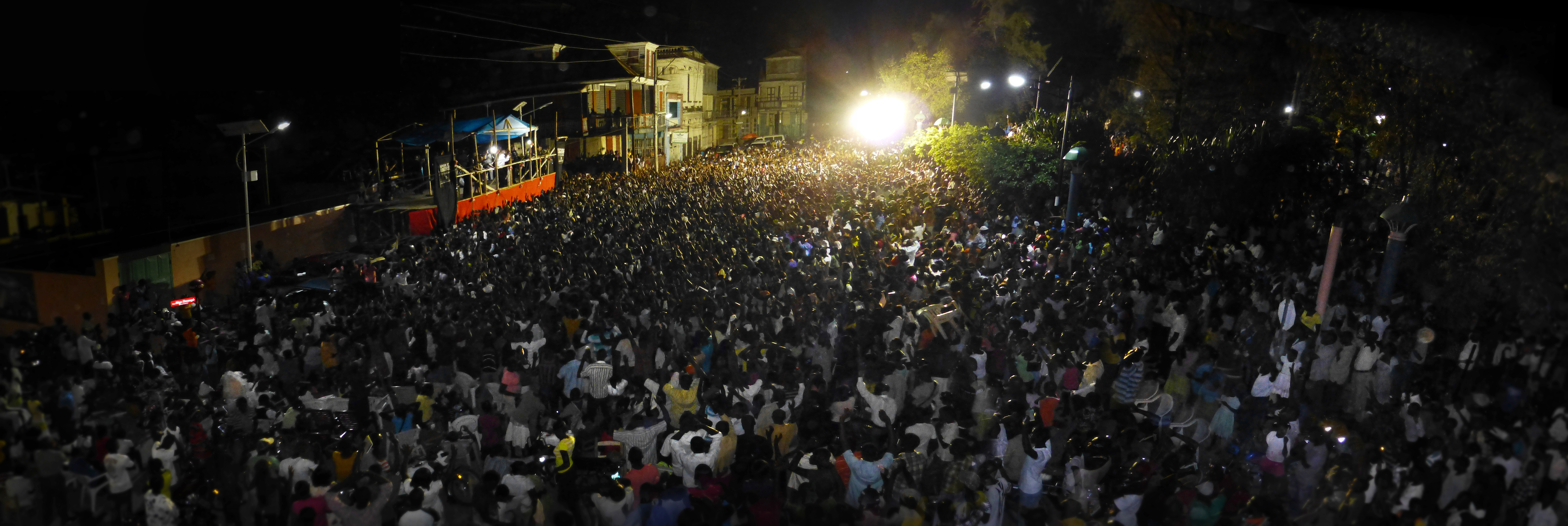
JA Pérez Festival in the city of Jérémie, Grand'Anse, Haiti.

Pérez also organizes festivals which are held at stadiums or plazas. During the day, ongoing educational workshops are offered. Arts, theater, and music productions are held, with a concert every night. At every festival, Pérez speaks to the audience.

Other mass events were held in 2014 in Corail, Beaumont, and Roseaux in Haiti. There, Pérez collaborated with the Luis Palau Association to hold a city-wide concert by the Reggae group Christafari.

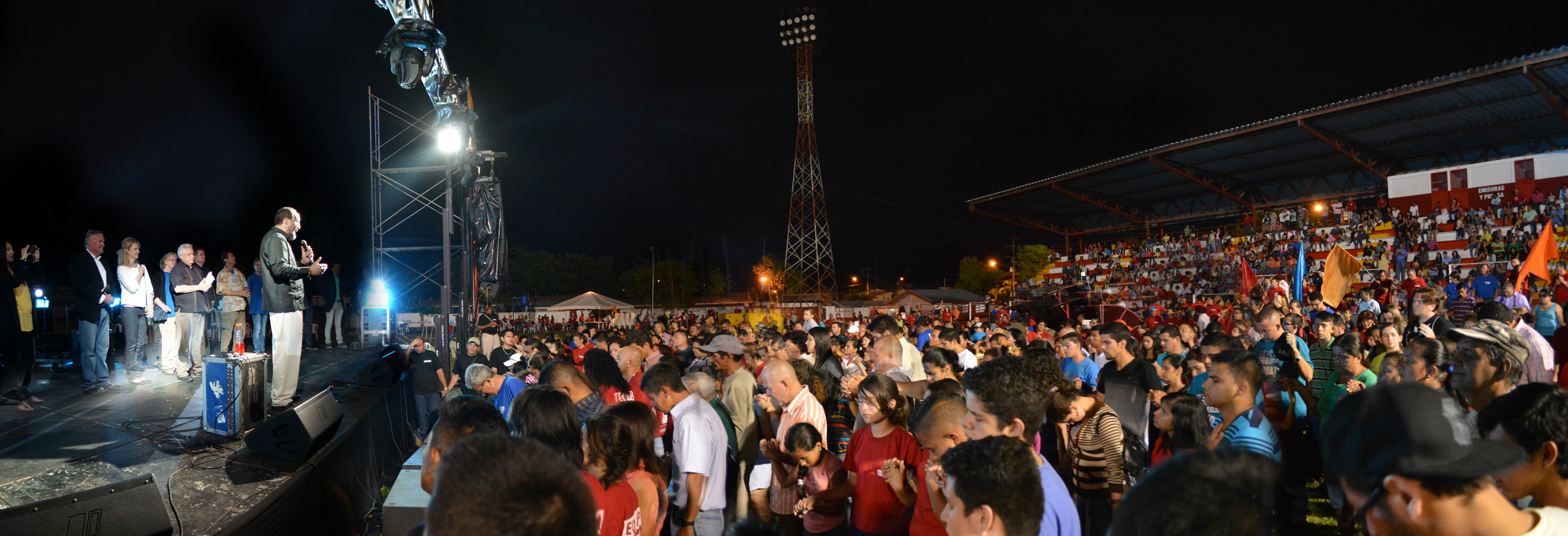
JA Pérez addressing a large crowd of more than 20,000 people at his Costa Rica Republic of Joy Festival in 2014.

== Books by pen name ==
=== Jorge Armando Pérez Venancio ===
- Los Profetas de Gúlumm ISBN 978-0578023205 Publisher: Keen Sight Books (May 27, 2009)
- El Fin de Toda Jactancia: Exaltando la completa obra de Jesucristo ISBN 978-1451580112 (June 16, 2009)
- Lecciones de un Viejo Profeta Mentiroso ISBN 978-1452819167 (April 18, 2010)
- Las Reglas que Regulan la Abundancia: 10 reglas elementales que le ayudarán a prosperar de la manera que Dios quiere ISBN 978-1456511296 (December 30, 2010)
- Las Suegras: 7 principios para mejorar las relaciones entre nueras y suegras ISBN 978-1450574839 Publisher: Independent Publishing Platform (July 1, 2009)
- Evangelismo Efectivo: Manual Interactivo Escuela de Evangelismo ISBN 978-1460902653 Publisher: Independent Publishing Platform (July 29, 2009)
- Saber Llegar: No se trata de llegar primero ISBN 978-1456399801 Publisher: Independent Publishing Platform (January 6, 2010)
- La Ciencia del Pobre ISBN 978-1460913949 Publisher: CreateSpace Independent Publishing Platform (February 7, 2011)

=== JA Pérez ===
- Lider con Mente de Reino: 10 principios culturalmente sensitivos para el liderazgo internacional ISBN 978-0615810683 Publisher: Keen Sight Books (April 28, 2013)
- Poetas, Profetas y Otros con Imaginación ISBN 978-1467997867 Publisher: Independent Publishing Platform (November 27, 2011)
- 40 Profecias Cumplidas ISBN 978-0615688909 Publisher: Keen Sight Books (August 21, 2012)
- El Fin: Estado Profetico de las Naciones ISBN 978-0615732763 Publisher: Keen Sight Books; 1 edition (December 27, 2012)
- 100 Dias de Comunion, Sabiduria y Gracia ISBN 978-0615703855 Publisher: Keen Sight Books (September 21, 2012)
- Juntos por el Continente ISBN 978-0615793542 Publisher: Keen Sight Books 1 edition (April 13, 2013)
