= Jorge Martínez (footballer, born November 1983) =

Uruguayan footballer

Personal information
- Full name: Jorge Luis Martínez Ramos
- Date of birth: 3 November 1983 (age 43)
- Place of birth: Trinidad, Uruguay
- Height: 1.72 m (5 ft 8 in)
- Positions: Midfielder; forward

Youth career
- Nueva Chicago

Senior career*
Years	Team	Apps	(Gls)
2002–2005	Nueva Chicago	2	(0)
2006–2007	Temperley	34	(1)
2007	Gimnasia de Mendoza	11	(1)
2008	San Marcos	20	(6)
2008	Mineros de Guayana	3	(1)
2009	Minervén	1	(0)
2009	San Marcos	26	(6)
2010	Curicó Unido	12	(0)
2012	Barnechea	20	(1)
2014	Mitre	7	(0)
2018	Social Atlético Televisión	–	(–)
- * Club domestic league appearances and goals

Jorge Luis Martínez Ramos (born 3 November 1983 in Trinidad, Uruguay) is a Uruguayan former footballer who played as a midfielder or forward.

== Club history ==
- (Argentina) Nueva Chicago 2002–2005
- (Argentina) Temperley 2006–2007
- (Argentina) Gimnasia y Esgrima de Mendoza 2007
- (Chile) San Marcos de Arica 2008
- (Venezuela) Mineros de Guayana 2008
- (Venezuela) Minervén 2008
- (Chile) San Marcos de Arica 2009
- (Chile) Curicó Unido 2010
- (Chile) Barnechea 2012
- (Argentina) Mitre 2014
- (Argentina) Social Atlético Televisión 2018
