= Jorge García =

Jorge García or Garcia may refer to:

== Arts and entertainment ==
- Jorge García Usta (1960–2005), Colombian novelist, poet, essayist and journalist
- Jorge Garcia (born 1973), American actor
- Jorge Eduardo García (actor) (born 2002), Mexican actor

=== Fictional characters ===
- Jorge Garcia, a character from the Backyard Sports franchise

== Politics ==
- Jorge García Montes (1896–1982), Cuban politician
- Jorge García Granados (1900–1961), Guatemalan politician
- Jorge Cruickshank García (1915–1989), Mexican politician
- Jorge García Carneiro (1952–2021), Venezuelan politician
- Jorge Luis Garcia (1953–2010), American politician from Arizona
- Jorge Luis García Pérez (born 1964), Cuban human rights activist
- Jorge Mario García Laguardia, Guatemalan jurist

== Religion ==
- Jorge García Isaza (1928–2016), Colombian bishop
- Jorge Ignacio García Cuerva (born 1968), Argentine archbishop

== Sports ==
- Jorge García (alpine skier) (born 1956), Spanish alpine skier
- Jorge García (athlete) (born 1961), Spanish Olympic athlete
- Jorge García (weightlifter) (born 1987), Chilean weightlifter
- Jorge García (canoeist) (born 1988), Cuban Olympic sprint canoer
- Jorge García (windsurfer) (born 1962), Argentine Olympic windsurfer
- Jorge García Marín (born 1980), Spanish racing cyclist
- Jorge Garcia Perez (born 1997), Mexican boxer

=== Association football ===
- Jorge García (footballer, born 1956), Argentine football defender and manager
- Jorge García (footballer, born 1957), Spanish football goalkeeper
- Jorge García (footballer, born 1969), Argentine football forward
- Jorge García (footballer, born 1984), Spanish football defender
- Jorge García (footballer, born 1986), Uruguayan football midfielder
- Jorge García (footballer, born 1998), Nicaraguan football forward
- Jorge García (footballer, born 2002), Mexican football defender
