= Jorge Sánchez =

Jorge Sánchez may refer to:

- Jorge Noceda Sánchez (1925-1987), Dominican painter and diplomat
- Jorge Sánchez García (born 1943), Mexican politician
- Jorge Luis Sánchez (1960–2025), Cuban film director
- Jorge Sánchez (basketball) (born 1991), American wheelchair basketball player
- Jorge Sánchez (swimmer) (born 1977), Spanish swimmer
- Jorge Sánchez (footballer, born 1979), Salvadoran footballer
- Jorge Sánchez Salgado (born 1985), Cuban volleyball player
- Jorge Sánchez (footballer, born 1993), Mexican footballer
- Canillas (footballer) (Jorge Peláez Sánchez, born 1996), Spanish footballer
- Jorge Sánchez (footballer, born 1997), Mexican footballer
