= Jorge Martí Martínez =

Cuban politician and diplomat

Jorge Martí Martínez is a Cuban politician and diplomat. He is the former Ambassador Extraordinary and Plenipotentiary of the Republic of Cuba to the Russian Federation, also was Ambassador of the Republic of Cuba to Finland, Estonia, Latvia and Lithuania. was accredited as ambassador in Russia from 16 April 2003 to 2008. Since March 2009 to 2010 he was the Head of the Cuban Communist Party Foreign Relations. Now ambassador in Poland since January 2017. He is married to Mirta Alicia Karchik.
