= Jorge Luis Mendoza Cárdenas =

Mexican gangster

- Other names: La Garra (English: The Claw); José Luis Mendoza Cardenas
- Employer: Jalisco New Generation Cartel (suspected)
- Criminal charge: Drug trafficking
- Criminal status: Fugitive

Notes
- Wanted by the Drug Enforcement Administration (DEA) since 2016

Jorge Luis Mendoza Cárdenas, commonly referred to by his alias La Garra ('The Claw'), is a Mexican suspected drug lord and high-ranking leader of the Jalisco New Generation Cartel (CJNG), a criminal group based in Jalisco. Security forces suspect that La Garra heads the drug trafficking operations for the CJNG in the United States under Nemesio Oseguera Cervantes (alias "El Mencho"), the top leader of the criminal group. La Garra reportedly coordinates marijuana, cocaine, heroin, and methamphetamine shipments to Los Angeles, San Jose, Atlanta, and New York City from Mexico.

Unlike his counterparts, few details are known of his criminal background. In 2008, he was arrested for his alleged participation in the murder of a family of six in Jalisco. However, when those involved were charged in an indictment, La Garra was released from prison without a public explanation. His name was not mentioned in the legal proceedings. Over the years, he rose to the top of the CJNG's leadership chain. In 2016, the Drug Enforcement Administration (DEA) identified La Garra as one of top three leading members of the CJNG.

== Early life and career ==
Unlike his counterparts in the Jalisco New Generation Cartel (CJNG), few official details exist of La Garra's criminal background. Mexican state authorities suspected he was involved in a 2008 murder incident case. On 25 July 2008, authorities identified La Garra as part of a gang that participated in the murder of six family members in Zapotlán el Grande, Jalisco. The six victims were Félix Bautista Lugo (aged 69); Carmen Campos Cárdenas (aged 45); her sister, Adriana Patricia Campos Cárdenas (aged 24); Roberto Bernardino Campos (aged 17), son of Carmen and stepson of Félix; and Magali and Mayra Bautista Campos (aged 8 and 7), daughters of Carmen and Félix. All but two of the victims (Roberto Bernardino and Carmen) had coup de grâce wounds. These two were stabbed and killed by asphyxia respectively. The family was originally from Zacatecas and San Luis Potosí, and had bought the house from the former governor of Jalisco and Secretariat of Agriculture, Alberto Cárdenas Jiménez. Though the family shared a last name with the politician, he claimed that they were not blood-related to him and were only long-time friends. The family had moved to the new home two months prior to the incident because one of their relatives was kidnapped.

When the bodies were found, investigators concluded that the victims were killed 36 and 48 hours prior to their discovery. Investigators also located a vehicle owned by the family, and discovered that one of the victims had withdrawn a large sum of money from a bank prior to the murder. Investigators later found out that the incident started as far as 4 April, when Roberto Bernardino was kidnapped and released after the family paid a large sum of money. During that incident, one former agent of Jalisco's anti-kidnapping squad came in contact with the family. He noticed that the family was wealthy and relayed that information to a kidnapping ring he was working with. They worked together to kidnap the entire family and force them to withdraw money from their bank accounts. However, Roberto Bernardino noticed that the Jalisco official and the kidnapping group were working together and was killed. The abductors then decided to murder the rest of the family to cover up their collusion.

On 1 August, La Garra and six other men were arrested for their alleged involvement in the crime. According to state officials, they stole MXN$400,000 from the family. Police officers believe this sum of money was intended to be used as ransom money by the family to pay the kidnappers for their relatives' return. Officials also seized two vehicles, multiple rounds of ammunition, two guns, and communication equipment. On 30 August 2008, a court in Jalisco formally issued seven charges for the murder. However, La Garra's name was not in any of the indictments. Authorities claimed that the case was not related to drug trafficking and was strictly a kidnapping scheme conducted by an abduction ring and an anti-kidnapping agent working for the Jalisco state government. La Garra was released from prison without any public explanation from authorities. Years after his release, La Garra's influence within the CJNG grew and he positioned himself as one of the leading members of the criminal group.

== Leadership tenure ==
In November 2016, the Drug Enforcement Administration (DEA) identified La Garra as one of the top three leaders of the CJNG, along with El Mencho and Abigael González Valencia (alias "El Cuini"). (Note: At the time the report was released, Abigael González Valencia (alias "El Cuini") had been arrested. He was arrested by Mexican authorities in 2015.) La Garra's decision-making power and role within the CJNG is lower than El Mencho's. According to the DEA report, the CJNG was responsible for shipping wholesale amounts of methamphetamine, marijuana, cocaine, and heroin to the United States from the border crossings in Tijuana, Ciudad Juárez, and Nuevo Laredo. The CJNG then used distribution centers in Los Angeles and Atlanta to move narcotics across the country. In the report, the DEA stated that La Garra's organization was the newest of the main drug trafficking groups in Mexico and had risen to prominence through aggressive territorial expansion. In Mexico, La Garra reportedly operates mainly in Jalisco, Colima, Guanajuato, Nayarit, Veracruz, Morelos, Guerrero, and Michoacán.

At least 26 active drug-related investigations by the DEA were open that year against CJNG members, including La Garra. In addition to him, other suspected Mexican drug lords were mentioned in the report. From the Sinaloa Cartel, the DEA targeted Joaquín "El Chapo" Guzmán, Ismael Zambada García (alias "El Mayo"), and Dámaso López Núnez (alias "El Licenciado"); from the Juárez Cartel they targeted Jesús Salas Aguayo (alias "El Chuyín"), Carlos Arturo Quintana Quintana (alias "El 80"), and Julio César Olivas Torres (alias "El Sexto"); from the Gulf Cartel it targeted José Antonio Romo López (alias "Don Chucho") and Petronilo Moreno Flores (alias "Panilo"); from Los Zetas and the Beltrán Leyva Cartel they targeted Óscar Omar Treviño Morales (alias "Z-42") and Héctor Beltrán Leyva (alias "El H") respectively. At least six of the eight men mentioned in the DEA reports were not wanted by the Mexican government at the time of the announcement. The DEA was looking to apprehended all these individuals, including La Garra.

In a report the following the year, the DEA increased the number of active investigations against the CJNG hierarchy to 46. La Garra was listed a main CJNG member again, along as his counterparts El Mencho and El Cuini. In addition to Los Angeles and Atlanta, the DEA reported that the CJNG also had distribution centers in San Jose and New York City. Several of the previously mentioned suspected drug lords were kept in this report, but there were some additions to the release. For the Sinaloa Cartel, the DEA included Rafael Caro Quintero; in the Gulf Cartel, they added José Alfredo Cárdenas Martínez (alias "El Contador"); for Los Zetas they included Juan Francisco Treviño Chávez (alias "El Kiko") and Juan Gerardo Treviño Chávez (alias "El Huevo"); and for the Beltrán Leyva Cartel they added Fausto Isidro Meza Flores (alias "Chapo Isidro"), Juan Francisco Patrón Sánchez (alias "H2"), and José Luis Ruelas Torres.

Security forces suspect that La Garra is one of the leading coordinators of the CJNG in the United States. Based on his influence in the United States, investigators suspect that La Garra may not live in Mexico and may be residing in the United States, specifically California, where the CJNG has a major corridor through Tijuana. According to the DEA, Mexican nationals who work for drug trafficking groups may enter the U.S. legally or illegally, and try to blend in with the larger Mexican-American communities in the U.S. In some cases, these U.S.-based members may have family ties with suspected drug lords in Mexico, or have ties with the communities where the criminal group was originally from. Upon a successful career in Mexico, some U.S.-based members return to Mexico to work directly with the criminal group that employed them.

By 2019, La Garra was listed by the DEA as not only being in charge of the CJNG's trafficking operations to the United States, but also serving as the CJNG's liaison as well.

== See also ==
- List of fugitives from justice who disappeared
- Mexican drug war
