= Jorge D. Reyes =

American surgeon and academic

Jorge D. Reyes is an American surgeon and academic.

Reyes is focused on enhancing organ transplant options and availability, improving outcomes post-transplant, and minimizing immunosuppression and tolerance induction. Reyes is currently the Roger K. Giesecke Distinguished Chair in Transplant Surgery at the University of Washington.
