= Jorge Castañeda =

Jorge Castañeda may refer to:

- Jorge Castañeda y Álvarez de la Rosa (1921–1997), Mexican foreign secretary 1979–82
- Jorge Castañeda Gutman (born 1953), Mexican foreign secretary 2000–03, academic, son of the above
- Jorge Castañeda (footballer) (born 1970), Mexican footballer
- Jorge Castaneda (boxer) (born 1996), American boxer
