= Jorge Luis Lara Aguilar =

Mexican politician

- Born: 6 October 1954 (age 71); Chiapas, Mexico
- Occupation: Politician
- Political party: PRD

Jorge Luis Lara Aguilar (born 6 October 1954) is a Mexican politician from the Party of the Democratic Revolution. In 2012 he served as Deputy of the LXI Legislature of the Mexican Congress representing Chiapas.
