= Jorge Cruz (artist) =

American artist

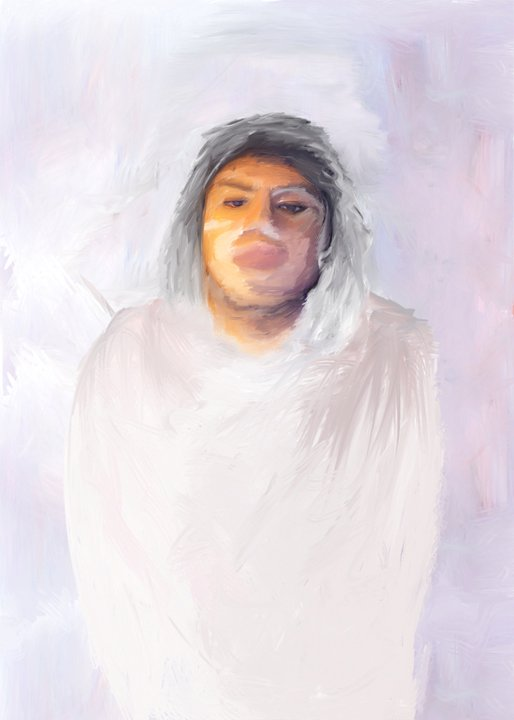
Self-portrait

Jorge Cruz is an American transgender avant-garde musical artist.

== Trax Records ==
In an interview with Camilo Rocha, Cruz described the forthcoming plans that he had with Trax Records. One of which included a prematurely signed single of Azari and III, which was never released on the label but ended up on their self-titled debut album, it was also released on Turbo Recordings. After Cruz became appointed the creative and public relations director at the label zhe has organized and curated notable projects such as the 25th Anniversary party – which was chosen by Chicago Tribune's Greg Kot as his "Top Weekend Choice" – a visual rebranding of the label, a 25th Anniversary mixtape mixed by Joe Smooth and has signed, released and produced singles from Little Boots, Nic Sarno and Sir Nenis. Jorge also curated the Trax Records: The 25th Anniversary Album which was released on October 18, 2011. The album itself was a new direction for the label as the songs on the LP were less known, darker and unlike the 20th Anniversary compilation which had 30 songs in it, only included 11 songs. Carol Cooper from the Village Voice, Fox News Radio and the NY Daily News heralded it as one of the fall's most anticipated releases.

== monamiejorge†apes ==
After co-curating the Joe Smooth mixtape a new series of mixtapes appeared on what is now known as "monamiejorge†apes" which is hosted on bandcamp, the same site zhe chose to exclusively host Trax Record's entire catalogue. The series includes Jorge asking notable dj's to create a mixtape inspired by a theme or idea. Some mixtapes include a Johan Agebjörn tape, Mariam which was inspired by interspecies love and was released right before Johan Agebjörn's release of his Casablanca Nights release. Others include tapes by Don Rimini, My Panda Shall Fly, BeatauCue, Kim Ann Foxman and DJ White Shadow. Often the mixtapes were featured on URB.com, URB Magazine's digital space, also a place where zhe frequently contributed until Jorge's resignation in September 2011. Tapes have also premiered exclusively on Spin.com, and the Chicagoist.com.

== Photography and design ==
Jorge has one completed series, "Untitled", which consists of portraits of zher mother and in which the mother is a representation of Cruz. Jorge is also working on a continuing body of work titled "Living @ Home". Aline Smithson of Lenscratch was one of the first people to interview Jorge about zher work. Quickly after zher work was featured on Lenscratch, Cruz's work also appeared on C-Monster, Regina Hackett's, art critic of the Seattle Post-Intelligencer, "Another Bouncing Ball", and Feature Shoot.

"Living @ Home" is a photo documentary series in which Jorge documents the everyday lives of zher family. In an interview with The Shpilman Institute of Photography, based in Tel-Aviv, Israel, Jorge described zher work as "part grim reaper, part Nan Goldin". Also in the same interview zhe described that the body of work is an ongoing series that zhe plans to complete once zhe is dead.

Jorge's third photographic series is titled "Revolving". The series is all concert photography and some backstage portraits of people like Alicia Keys, Teagan and Sara, Boyz Noise, and SBTRKT.

Jorge has also redesigned most of Trax Records' releases and has been designing all the covers for all the latest releases excluding Sir Nenis' "Freaks" and including the vinyl for Little Boots' "Every Night I Say A Prayer" which was specially released for Record Store Day 2012. Jorge also designs all the covers for the monamiejorge†apes.

== Discography ==
=== Mixtapes ===
- "Hints" of Jazzmin (June 2006)
- "Deux" (June 2009)
- "Demon Cry" (September 2010)
- "Summerz Not Dead" by Willy Joy (September 2010)
- "Go Vogue" by Logo (November 2010)
- "Sashey" by Sishi Rösch (April 2011)
- "Trax Records 25th Anniversary Mixtape" by Joe Smooth (December 2010)
- "The Mix" by Nic Sarno (February 2011) * originally appeared in The Chicagoist
- "Back To Chicago" by My Panda Shall Fly (April 2011)
- "Mariam" by Johan Agebjörn (May 2011)
- "No" (May 2011)
- "Sebastian" (May 2011)
- "The All Seeing Eye" by BeatauCue (June 2011)
- "Adonis" by Don Rimini (July 2011)
- "Aradia" by DJ White Shadow (August 2011)
- "Womping Willow" by Ming (October 2011)
- "North Coast Music Festival Official 2011 Mixtape" by Bandiit (September 2011)
- "Trax Records: The 25th Anniversary Album Mixtape" by Kim Ann Foxman (August 2011)
- "変態ブーツ" by Boyfriend (March 2012)
- "Meet Me In The Bathroom" by Jorge (December 2012)
- "زبد" by Cosmonaut Grechko (February 2013)
- "Steam" by Kreap (March 2013)
- "Smile" by WEARE18 (May 2013)

=== Curated albums ===
- Trax Records: The 25th Anniversary Album (October 2011)
- Summertrax (June 2012)
- Screamin Rachael: Queen of House (August 2013)
- TransTRAX (December 2013)

=== Singles and EP's ===
- In the Beginning (Nic Sarno Remake) by Nic Sarno (signed)
- Freaks by Sir Nenis (signed)
- The Flow by Nic Sarno (producer)
- Every Night I Say A Prayer (Nic Sarno Remix) by Little Boots (producer)
- Every Night I Say A Prayer (Joe Smooth N. Halsted Remix) by Little Boots (producer)
- Every Night I Say A Prayer (My Panda Shall Fly Dark Ambient Remix) by Little Boots (producer)
- Every Night I Say A Prayer (Screamin' D-Man Jukey Juke Remix) by Little Boots (producer)
- Every Night I Say A Prayer by Little Boots (signed)
- Don't Stop by Sir Nenis (signed)
- Purple Mountains Majestic by Sir Nenis (signed)
