= Jorge Riveros =

Colombian painter, sculptor and illustrator (born 1934)

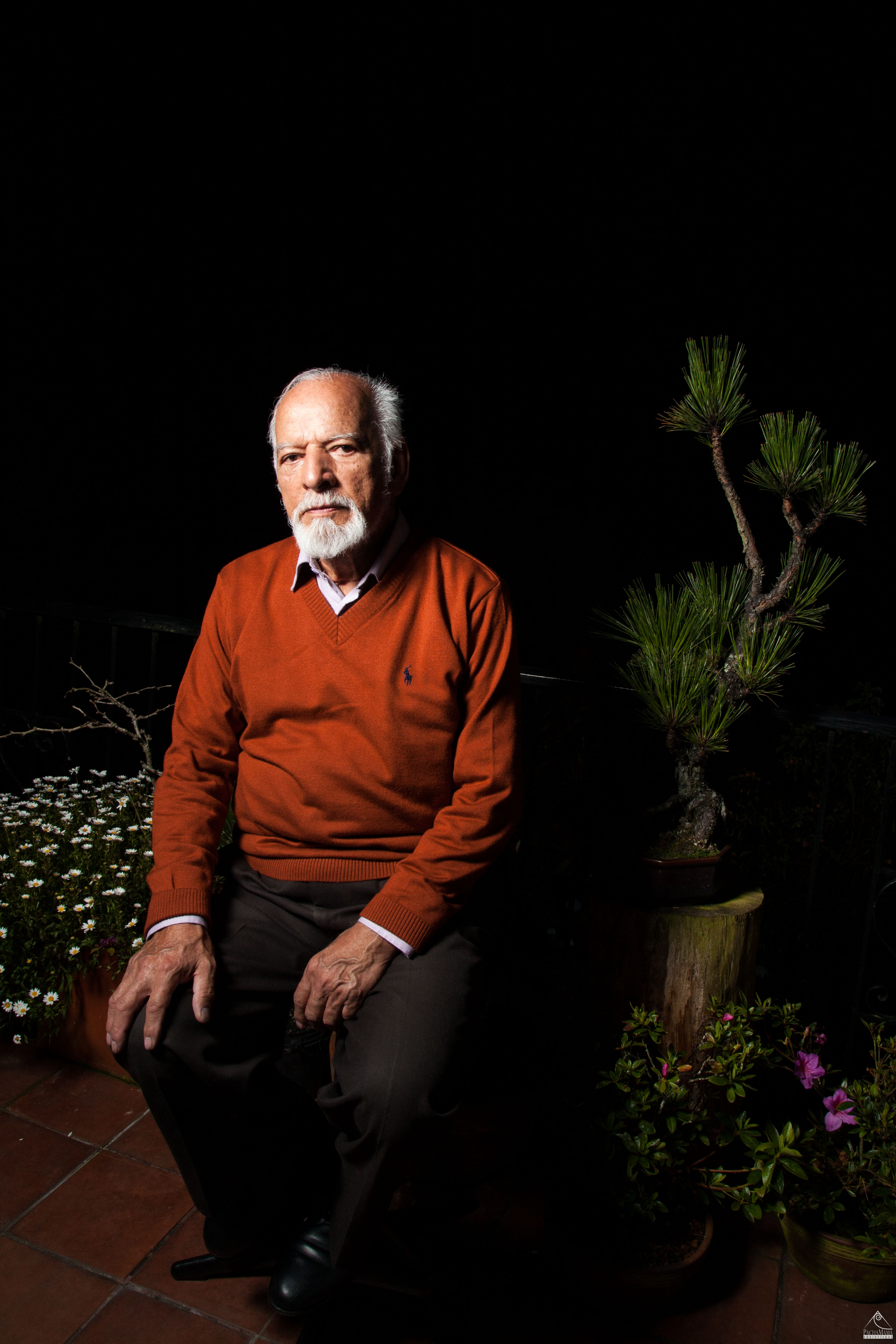
- Jorge Riveros
- Born: Jorge Riveros Salcedo; 10 November 1934 (age 91); Ocaña, Colombia
- Known for: Painter, sculptor
- Spouse: Inge Beeck de Riveros
- Website: jorgeriveros.com

Jorge Riveros (Ocaña, 10 November 1934) is a Colombian painter, sculptor and illustrator.

His art evolved over the course of his professional career, achieving an important aspect in his works: significance.

== Early work ==
Riveros moved to Bogotá in 1948, and began to work as an illustrator in 1950 for the periodicals "El Liberal" and "El Diario Gráfico," and for Cromos magazine.

He studied at the Escuela Nacional de Bellas Artes from 1951 to 1956, graduating with the titles of Master in Painting and Professor of Drawing. From then on, he taught at several different drawing schools.

It was the year 1960 when he had his first solo exhibition of figurative impressionism, a trend that, following that year, he dedicated to avant-garde constructivist geometry.

== Europe ==
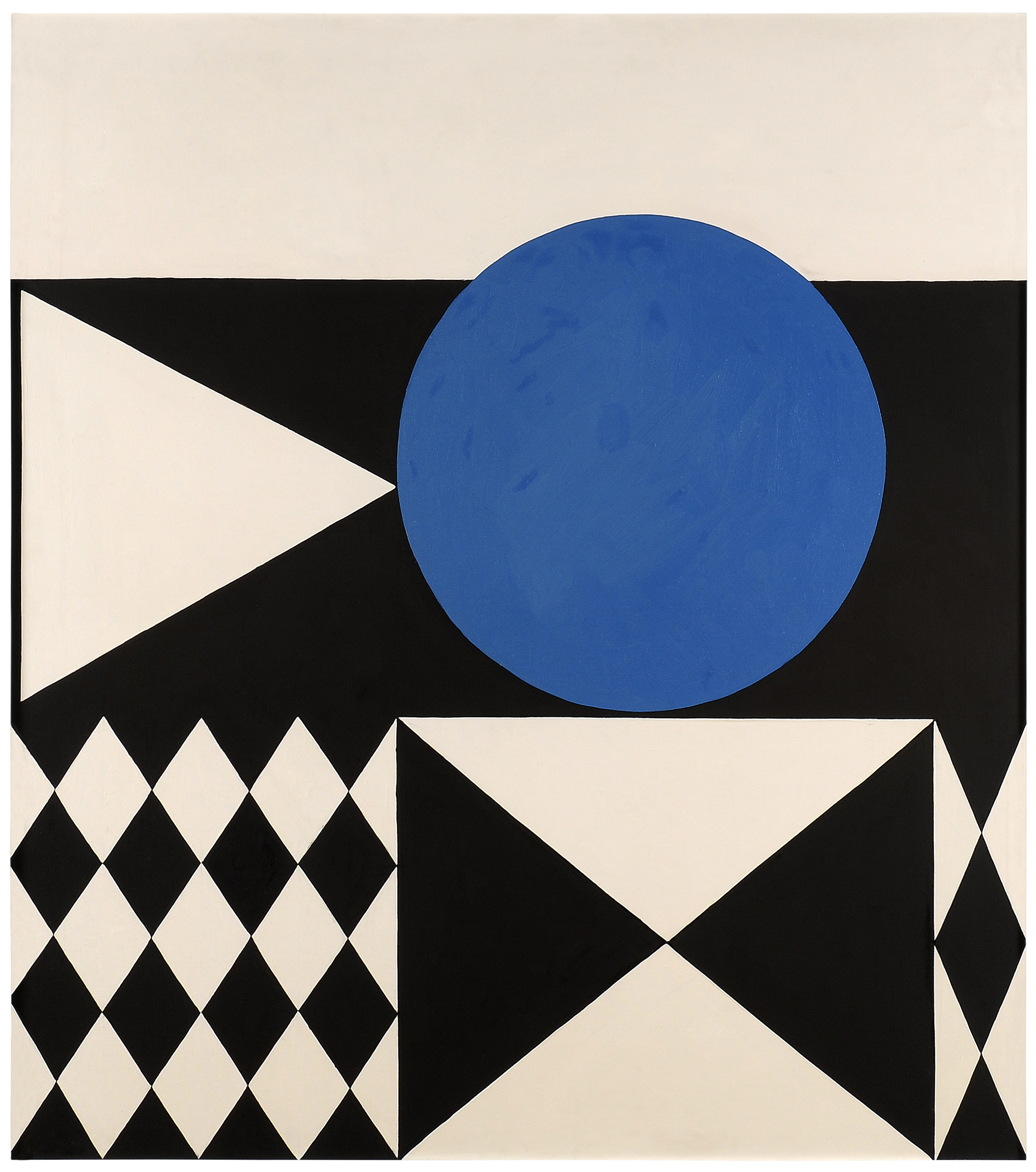
Blue circle, 1974, 100 x 90 cm, Wacofin / Canvas

The first award given to Master Jorge Riveros was from the Salon of Artists from Santander in 1964. That same year he traveled to Europe to take a course on the History of Art at the Instituto de Cultura Hispánica and to specialize in Mural Painting at the Escuela de Bellas Artes in Madrid, Spain. One year later, in 1965, he moved to Germany and was involved in several individual and group exhibitions in different cities of that country.

In 1969 he began to experiment with geometric abstraction and came to form a part of the "Semikolon" group of artists, holding numerous exhibitions with that association. That year he also became a member of the Art Association for Rhineland and Westphalia in Düsseldorf. Riveros was issued an invitation in 1971 to form a part of the International Organization of Constructivist Painters, "Circle of Constructivist Work," headquartered in the city of Bonn.

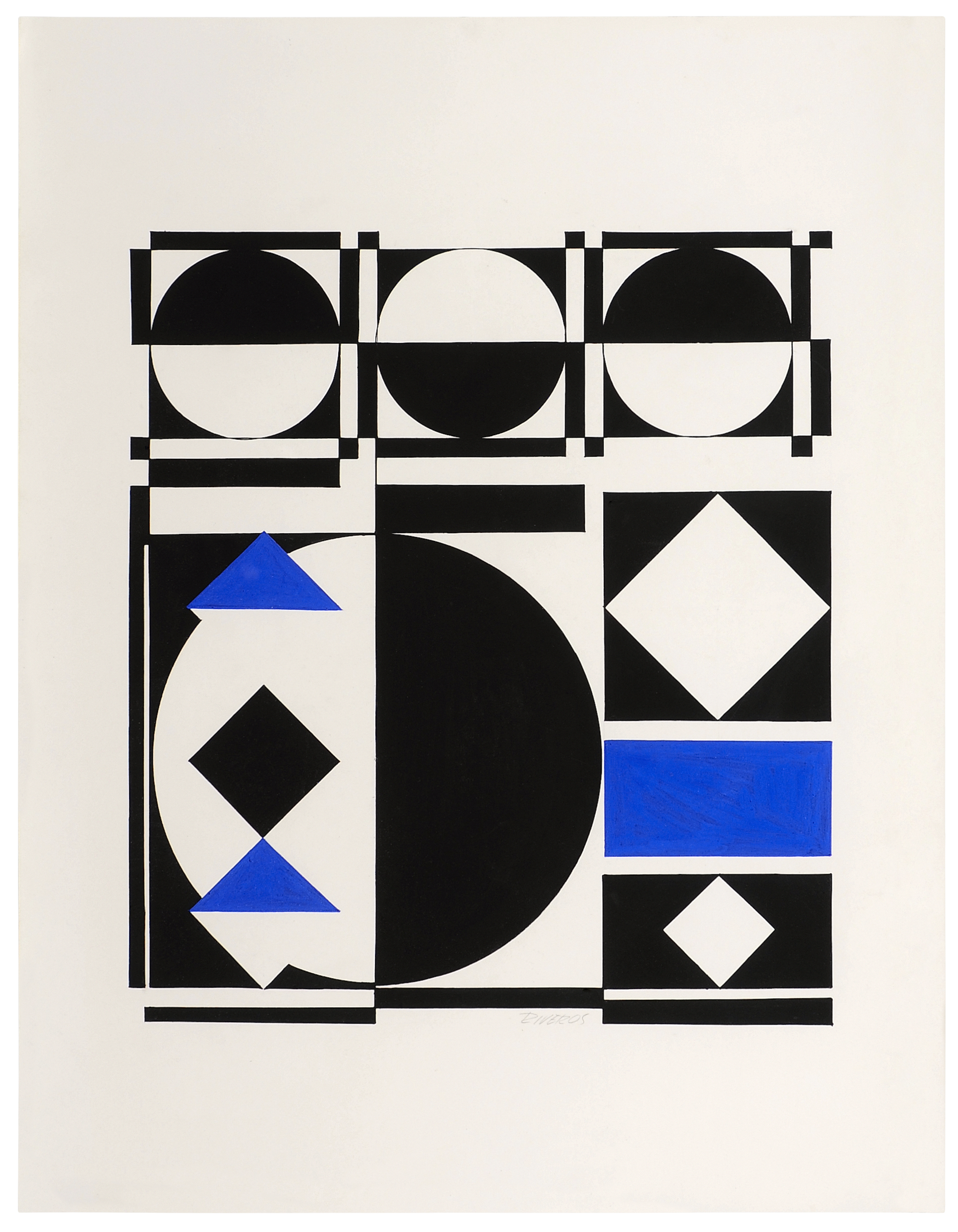
Series: Constructive Evocation # 8, 1971, 64 x 49 cm, Wacofin / Cardboard

== Colombia ==
In 1975, Riveros decided to return to Colombia. He received an appointment as a professor in the Fine Arts Department at Universidad Nacional de Colombia; the main courses he taught were Still Life, Portraiture, Nudes, and Landscapes until 1999. By 1977, he was also a professor of drawing and painting at Universidad Jorge Tadeo Lozano and Universidad de La Sabana.

His painting moved toward Constructivism with clear pre-Columbian influences at the beginning of the 80s and for approximately two decades, displaying more intense and varied colors. In 1983 he participated as a judge and a special guest in the first Visual Arts Salon in Cúcuta, and the following year, the government of Argentina invited him to represent Colombian art at the National Art Fund in his capacity as a painter and a Fine Arts professor at Universidad Nacional de Colombia.

In 1986 he became a founding member of the Museo Bolivariano de Arte in Santa Marta, Colombia. Four years later, in 1990, he traveled to Germany to study, and participated in an auction of Latin American Art at Christie's New York.

Riveros experimented with large-format murals in 1996.

In 1999 he concluded his teaching career, and published the book "Jorge Riveros" written by Francisco Gil Tovar and Víctor Guédez. That same year, the Governor of Norte de Santander decreed that the life and work of Jorge Riveros would be included in school curriculum.

Riveros has participated in art fairs such as ARTFI in Santo Domingo and ARTBO in Bogotá. Throughout his career, he has also worked in metal sculpture and has undertaken several projects for public spaces in Bogotá. In 2010 he developed plans for urban fixtures and installations.

Revisiting his work developed in Germany during the 60s and 70s in geometric abstraction, as of 1996 Riveros has completed several works using his ideas and concepts from that era.

On 20 July 2014, in celebration of the Independence of Colombia, the artist drew Google's commemorative Doodle for that day. .

He currently lives and works in Bogotá.

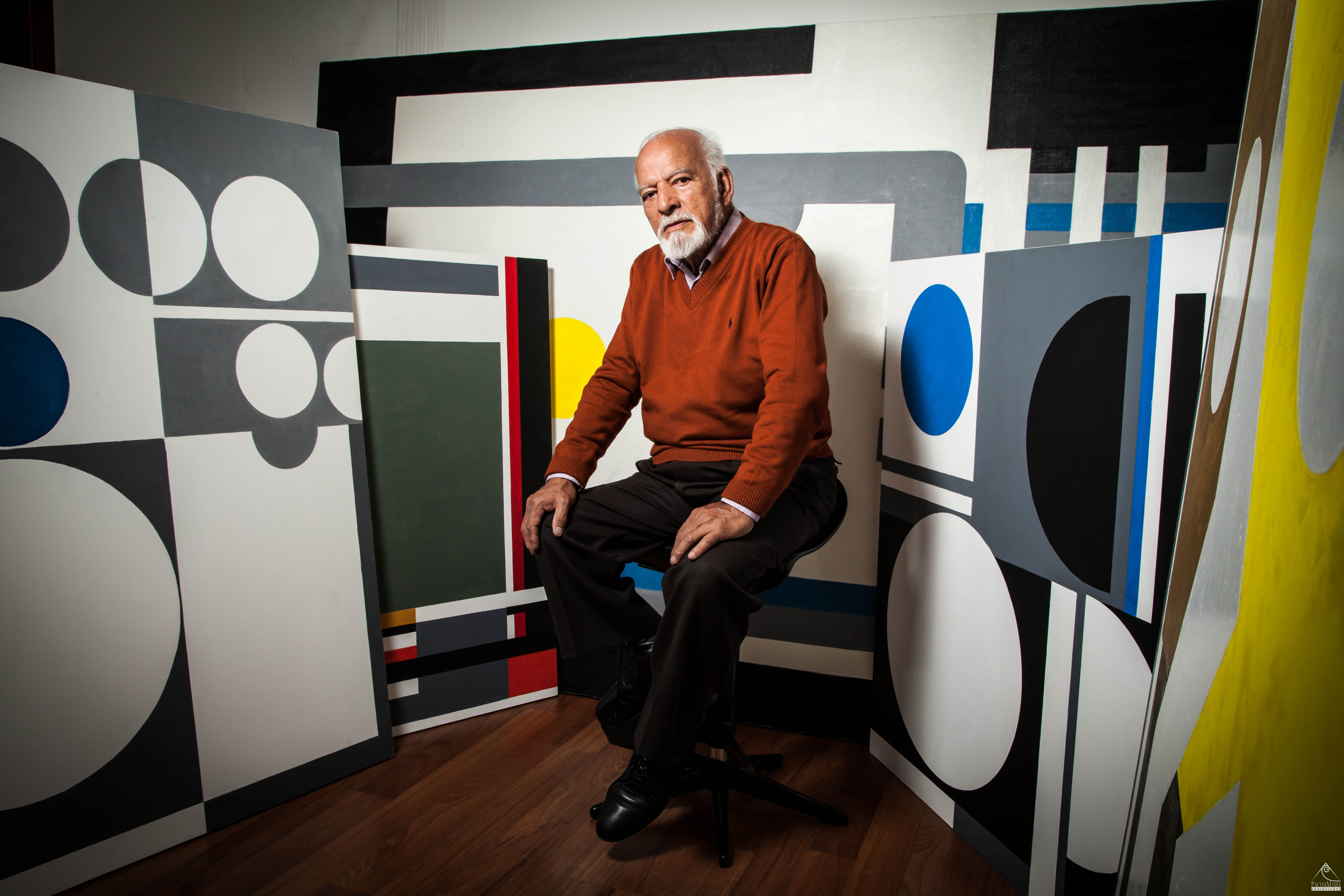
Master Jorge Riveros

== Solo art shows ==
Year	Location	City
1960	Sociedad Económica Amigos del País	Bogotá, Colombia
1961	Galería El Callejón	Bogotá, Colombia
1962	Hotel Tequendama	Bogotá, Colombia
1962	Galería Industrial Biermann	Bogotá, Colombia
1963	Sala de Extensión Cultural de la Fundación Universidad de América	Bogotá, Colombia
1964	Galería El Callejón	Bogotá, Colombia
1966	Ibero Club	Bonn, Alemania
1966	Ibero América Haus	Frankfurt, Alemania
1968	Bonner Kunstverein	Bonn, Alemania
1971	Galerie Glaub	Köln, Alemania
1972	Galerie Dörner	Hagen, Alemania
1973	Galerie Ernährungsministerium	Bad Godesberg, Alemania
1973	Bonner Kunstverein	Bonn, Alemania
1973	Kurfürstlichen Gärtnerhaus	Bonn, Alemania
1974	Galería Escala	Bogotá, Colombia
1974	Galerie 61	Velbert, Alemania
1976	Galería El Callejón	Bogotá, Colombia
1977	Salón XX	Bogotá, Colombia
1977	Galería Meindl	Bogotá, Colombia
1978	Galería El Callejón	Bogotá, Colombia
1978	Galería Arte Autopista	Medellín, Colombia
1978	Cámara de Comercio	Bucaramanga, Colombia
1980	Cámara de Comercio	Montería, Colombia
1982	Galería Belarca	Bogotá, Colombia
1983	Galería Belarca	Bogotá, Colombia
1984	Galería Arte Autopista	Medellín, Colombia
1985	Galería Acosta Valencia	Bogotá, Colombia
1987	Galería Belarca	Bogotá, Colombia
1987	Galería Arte Autopista	Medellín, Colombia
1988	lber Arte Galería	Bogotá, Colombia
1990	Museo Arte Moderno	Bucaramanga, Colombia
1990	Galería Punkt	Berlín, Alemania
1991	Galería Belarca	Bogotá, Colombia
1993	Galería Arte Autopista	Medellín, Colombia
1993	Exposición Itinerante por siete ciudades	Bélgica y Francia
1993	Galería Belarca	Bogotá, Colombia
1993	Galería Arte Moderno	Cali, Colombia
1994	Galería M&S	Quito, Ecuador
1995	Museo Bolivariano de Arte Contemporáneo	Santa Marta, Colombia
1996	Realización de mural en técnica mosaico	Facultad de Veterinaria, Universidad Nacional de Colombia
1996	Realización de mural en 12 módulos	Facultad de Derecho, Universidad Nacional de Colombia
1997	Cámara de Comercio de Montería	Montería, Colombia
1997	Galería Arte Autopista	Medellín, Colombia
1998	Lanzamiento del libro Jorge Riveros	Villa del Rosario, Colombia
1998	Club del Comercio	Ocaña, Colombia
1998	Galería Biblioteca Gabriel Turbay	Bucaramanga, Colombia
1999	Galería Fundación Pluma	Bogotá, Colombia
1999	Galería Arte Autopista	Medellín, Colombia
2000	Galería "El Cau de la Carreta"	Sitges, España
2001	Consulado General de Colombia	Barcelona, España
2003	Restauración Mural del Maestro alemán Ivo Schaible	Bogotá, Colombia
2004	Galería Arte Autopista	Medellín, Colombia
2005	Universidad Los Libertadores "Una mirada a la obra del Maestro Riveros"	Bogotá, Colombia
2006	CENFER. Homenaje a su Vida y Obra	Bucaramanga, Colombia
2007	Centro Cultural Carrión Vivar	Bogotá, Colombia
2008	Torre del Reloj.	Cúcuta, Colombia
2008	Museo de Arte Moderno Ramírez Villamizar	Pamplona, Colombia
2009	Museo de Arte Moderno	Santo Domingo, República Dominicana
2010	Galería Alonso Garcés. Jorge Riveros 1968 – 1978	Bogotá, Colombia
2011	Galería Arte Autopista	Medellín, Colombia
2015	Museo de Arte Moderno de Bogotá	Bogotá, Colombia

== Group exhibitions ==
Year	Location	City
1962	XIII Salón de Artistas Nacionales	Bogotá, Colombia
1963	XIV Salón de Artistas Nacionales	Bogotá, Colombia
1963	Galería de Arte "El Escarabajo Azul"	Bogotá, Colombia
1964	Primer Premio del 2ndo Salón de Artistas Santandereanos	Bucaramanga, Colombia
1964	Galería de Arte Moderno. Seis Pintores Jóvenes	Bogotá, Colombia
1964	Museo de Arte Moderno	Bogotá, Colombia
1965	III Bienal de Pintura y Escultura	Zaragoza, España
1966	Galería de Arte Moderno	Bogotá, Colombia
1967	Primera Bienal Internacional	Barcelona, España
1968	Kunstpalast. XVIII Exposición de Invierno	Düsseldorf, Alemania
1968	Kunstpalast. XIX Exposición de Invierno	Düsseldorf, Alemania
1969	III Exposición de Arte de Düisdorf 69	Bonn-Düisdorf, Alemania
1970	Kunstpalast. XX Exposición de Invierno	Düsseldorf, Alemania
1971	Rheinisches Landesmuseum. "Bonner Künstler"	Bonn, Alemania
1971	Stadthalle "SemiKolon 7 1"	Bad Godesberg, Alemania
1971	Kölner Kunstkaleidoskop	Köln, Alemania
1971	Städtebauministerium. "Tendencias Constructivas"	Bad Godesberg, Alemania
1971	XXI Exposición de Invierno. Kunsthalle	Düsseldorf, Alemania
1972	Funkhaus Hannover	Hannover, Alemania
1972	Haus an der Redoute. Los Grandes Formatos	Bad Godesberg, Alemania
1972	XXII Exposición de Invierno	Düsseldorf, Alemania
1972	Forum Bildender Künstler	Essen, Alemania
1972	Kölner Kunstkaleidoskop	Köln, Alemania
1972	Haus an der Redoute. Los Pequeños Formatos	Bad Godesberg, Alemania
1973	Galerie im Dänischen Möbelhaus. Bonner Künstler 74	Bonn, Alemania
1974	Rheinisches Landesmuseum. Kunstmarkt	Bonn, Alemania
1974	XXIV Exposición de Invierno	Düsseldorf, Alemania
1975	Primer Salón de Artes Plásticas de ACOPEX	Bogotá, Colombia
1975	Haus an der Redoute	Bad Godesberg, Alemania
1976	Galería Independencia. Los Grandes de Colombia	Bogotá, Colombia
1976	Museo de Arte de la Universidad Nacional	Bogotá, Colombia
1976	Galería Escala	Bogotá, Colombia
1976	Haús an der Redoute	Bad Godesberg, Alemania
1976	Arte Contemporáneo de Latinoamérica	Frankfurt, Alemania
1977	Museo de Arte Contemporáneo. Salón de Agosto	Bogotá, Colombia
1977	Galería Independencia. Miniaturas de los Grandes de Colombia	Bogotá, Colombia
1977	Galería de Arte El Callejón. Panorama Artístico Colombiano	Bogotá, Colombia
1978	Galería El Charco	Cali, Colombia
1978	MAC Salón de Agosto	Bogotá, Colombia
1978	Feria del Arte	Bogotá, Colombia
1978	Galería de Arte El Callejón	Bogotá, Colombia
1978	Galería La Gruta	Bogotá, Colombia
1978	Bellas Artes	Ocaña, Colombia
1979	Galería Primera	Bucaramanga, Colombia
1979	MAC "Para los Niños"	Bogotá, Colombia
1979	Casa de la Cultura "García Rovira"	Bucaramanga, Colombia
1979	Galería Etcétera. Cinco Artistas Colombianos	Ciudad de Panamá, Panamá
1980	Galería Doroteo	Bogotá, Colombia
1980	Galería El Callejón. Panorama Artístico Colombiano	Bogotá, Colombia
1980	Club de Profesionales	Bucaramanga, Colombia
1981	Museo de Arte Universidad Nacional de Colombia	Bogotá, Colombia
1981	Galería del Banco Central Hipotecario. Grabados	Bogotá, Colombia
1981	Fundación Gilberto Alzate Avendaño. XII Salón de Agosto	Bogotá, Colombia
1981	Galería El Callejón	Bogotá, Colombia
1982	Galería Belarca	Bogotá, Colombia
1982	Galería Pluma	Bogotá, Colombia
1983	Biblioteca Luis Angel Arango	Bogotá, Colombia
1983	Ernita del Arte	Zipacón, Colombia
1983	Galería Elida Lara	Barranquilla, Colombia
1983	Galería Acosta Valencia	Bogotá, Colombia
1983	Galería Belarca	Bogotá, Colombia
1983	Galería El Callejón	Bogotá, Colombia
1983	Biblioteca Gabriel Turbay	Bucaramanga, Colombia
1983	Primer Salón de Artes Visuales. Jurado e Invitado Especial	Cúcuta, Colombia
1984	Galería Belarca	Bogotá, Colombia
1984	Galería Diners	Bogotá, Colombia
1984	Fondo Nacional de las Artes	Buenos Aires, Argentina
1984	Galería Elida Lara	Barranquilla, Colombia
1984	Arte Vial. 10 Pintores Colombianos	San Cristóbal, Venezuela
1985	Galería Belarca	Bogotá, Colombia
1985	Rathaus Stuttgart e IFA Galerie. Gráfica Colombiana	Bonn, Alemania
1985	Galería Elida Lara	Barranquilla, Colombia
1985	Galería Pluma	Bogotá, Colombia
1985	Galería Skandia	Bogotá, Colombia
1985	Galería Belarca.	Barranquilla, Colombia
1985	Artes Plásticas en Colombia. Airport Galerie	Frankfurt, Alemania
1985	Museo de Arte Moderno	Bogotá, Colombia
1985	Galería Roswitha Benkert Kusnacht	Zurich, Suiza
1986	Galería Elida Lara	Barranquilla, Colombia
1986	Galería Belarca	Bogotá, Colombia
1986	XXX Salón Nacional. Museo Nacional	Bogotá, Colombia
1986	Segunda Bienal	La Habana, Cuba
1986	Museo Bolivariano de Arte Contemporáneo	Santa Marta, Colombia
1987	Cámara de Comercio	Bogotá, Colombia
1987	Galería Belarca	Bogotá, Colombia
1988	Galería Arte Autopista	Medellín, Colombia
1988	Galería Belarca	Bogotá, Colombia
1989	Galería Casa Negret	Bogotá, Colombia
1989	21 Años Galería Belarca	Bogotá, Colombia
1989	Artistas Santandereanos del 60. Museo de Arte Moderno	Bucaramanga, Colombia
1989	XXXIII Salón Nacional	Bogotá, Colombia
1990	Galería Casa Negret	Bogotá, Colombia
1990	Artistas Santandereanos de los 60. Museo de Arte Moderno	Bucaramanga, Colombia
1990	Participación en la Subasta de Arte Latinoamericano. Christie's	New York, EEUU
1991	Galería D'Art. Expositores del Abstracto	Bogotá, Colombia
1991	Galería Carrión Vivar. Los Maestros	Bogotá, Colombia
1992	Galería Belarca	Bogotá, Colombia
1992	ARTFI	Bogotá, Colombia
1992	Galería Iber Arte. Bolívares	Bogotá, Colombia
1992	Galería Carrión Vivar	Bogotá, Colombia
1992	Convenio Andrés Bello. Ganador Concurso Retrato Andrés Bello	Bogotá, Colombia
1992	Museo de Arte Moderno Ramírez Villamizar	Pamplona, Colombia
1993	Galería Carrión Vivar	Bogotá, Colombia
1993	Galería Skandia	Bogotá, Colombia
1993	Galería Belarca	Bogotá, Colombia
1994	Galería Arte Moderno	Cali, Colombia
1994	Galería Belarca 25 años	Bogotá, Colombia
1994	Galería Arte Autopista	Medellín, Colombia
1994	Galería Lafayette	París Francia
1994	Forma y Color en Colombia	Bogotá, Colombia
1994	Galería Gyval	Pont Aven, Francia
1994	Museo de Arte Moderno	Guayaquil, Ecuador
1994	Museo de Arte Moderno	Bogotá, Colombia
1995	Galería Arte Autopista	Medellín, Colombia
1995	Galería Belarca	Bogotá, Colombia
1995	Forma y Color en Colombia	Bogotá, Colombia
1996	Museo Bolivariano de Arte Contemporáneo	Santa Marta, Colombia
1996	Galería M&S	Quito, Ecuador
1996	Galería Arte Autopista	Medellín, Colombia
1996	Galería Belarca	Bogotá, Colombia
1997	Arte Espacio. Uniandinos	Bogotá, Colombia
1997	Galería Mini formatos	Bogotá, Colombia
1997	Galería Belarca	Bogotá, Colombia
1998	Galería Carrión Vivar	Bogotá, Colombia
1998	Galería Arte Autopista	Medellín, Colombia
1999	"Arte Contemporáneo" Sala de Arte Universidad UDCA	Bogotá, Colombia
1999	Obra Gráfica. Sala de Arte Universidad UDCA	Bogotá, Colombia
1999	"La Violencia" Museo de Arte Moderno	Bogotá, Colombia
1999	"Obras Desconocidas de Maestros Conocidos" Universidad UDCA	Bogotá, Colombia
2000	Galería de Arte Autopista	Medellín, Colombia
2000	Galería Belarca	Bogotá, Colombia
2001	Arborizarte. Fundación Corazón Verde	Bogotá, Colombia
2001	Galería Carrión Vivar	Bogotá, Colombia
2002	Hotel Radisson	Bogotá, Colombia
2002	"Pequeño Formato" Museo de Arte de la Universidad Nacional	Bogotá, Colombia
2003	Centro Cultural de la Universidad de Salamanca	Bogotá, Colombia
2003	Museo de Arte Contemporáneo	Bogotá, Colombia
2003	Galería de Arte Autopista	Medellín, Colombia
2003	"30 Años del Museo de Arte" Museo de Arte de la Universidad Nacional	Bogotá, Colombia
2003	Galería Carrión Vivar	Bogotá, Colombia
2003	Museo de Arte Contemporáneo	Bogotá, Colombia
2003	"Mascaras". Museo Nacional	Bogotá, Colombia
2003	Oñate Fine Art	Miami, Colombia
2004	Galería Carrión Vivar	Bogotá, Colombia
2004	Animarte. Fundación Corazón Verde. Subastado con colaboración de Christie's.	New York, EEUU
2005	Sala de Arte Universidad UDCA	Bogotá, Colombia
2006	IV Feria de Artistas del Oriente Colombiano	Bucaramanga, Colombia
2007	Galería Mundo. Abstracción Geométrica en Colombia	Bogotá, Colombia
2007	Equus Arte. Fundación Corazón Verde. Subastado con colaboración de Christie's.	New York, EEUU
2008	Centro Cultural Carrión Vivar	Bogotá, Colombia
2009	Feria de Arte ARTBO 2009	Bogotá, Colombia
2009	ARTFI	Santo Domingo, República Dominicana
2009	Formarte. Fundación Corazón Verde. Subastado con colaboración de Christie's.	New York, EEUU
2010	Galería La Cometa. Geometría en Colombia	Bogotá, Colombia
2011	Exposición y subasta a favor del Museo de Omar Rayo	Roldanillo, Valle del Cauca, Colombia
2011	Azularte. Fundación Corazón Verde. Subastado con colaboración de Christie's	New York, EEUU
2011	"Grandes Maestros". Museo Bolivariano de Arte Contemporáneo	Santa Marta, Colombia
2012	Exposición y lanzamiento de los múltiples del programa Azularte	Bogotá, Colombia
2012	Exposición y subasta a favor del Museo de Arte Moderno Ramírez Villamizar	Pamplona, Colombia
2012	"Los que dibujan". Sala de Arte Universidad UDCA	Bogotá, Colombia
2012	Feria de Arte ARTBO 2012	Bogotá, Colombia
2013	Feria BarranquillARTE 2013	Barranquilla, Colombia
2014	Feria de arte ARTBO 2014 – Espacio "Referentes"	Bogotá, Colombia
2016	ARCO. Stand Galería León Tovar.	Madrid, España.
2016	"Shadows". Galería León Tovar.	Nueva York, Estados Unidos.
