= Gabriela Jorge =

Argentine politician

Patricia Gabriela Jorge (usually just Gabriela Jorge) is an activist in the Workers' Party (Argentina).

In November 2013 she was elected as a provincial deputy in Salta Province for the provincial capital and is a member of the health commission.

== Electoral history ==
=== 2013 Election ===
Name	Votes	Party
DEL PLA, CLAUDIO ARIEL	13.943.671	PO
GODOY, MANUEL SANTIAGO	5.076.243	PJ
QUINTANA, JULIO OSCAR	29.164.803	PO
DAVID, NESTOR JAVIER	22.785.378	FS
JORGE, GABRIELA PATRICIA	32.630.897	PO
RAMOS, EDUARDO ABEL	11.944.557	PJ
ZAPATA, CARLOS RAUL	12.790.162	SST
COLPARI, NORMA ELIZABETH	16.753.056	PO
BALDUZZI, MATILDE EPIFANIA	10.784.380	PJ
GUAYMAS, JORGE ANTONIO	13.661.516	MIJD
