= Aguirre (surname) =

Origin
- Region of origin: Basque country

Other names
- Variant forms: Aguerre, Aguirra, Aguirra, Aguirri, Daguerre, Izaguirre, Yzaguirre, Eyzaguirre, Zaguirre

Aguirre is a surname of Basque origin. It shows different variants (Agerre, Agerri, Ager) and composite surnames (Eizagirre, Agirresarobe, Agirrezabala, etc.), meaning 'prominent' or 'exposed prominence/place'. Lope de Aguirre was one of the first Europeans to explore the Americas. Based on "the U.S. Census Bureau's 1990 and 2000 censuses," HowManyofMe.site estimates in 2020 that 76,796 people bear the surname Aguirre in the United States, making the name statistically the country's 414th most common surname.

== People with the surname ==
=== Arts and entertainment ===
- Adriana Aguirre (born 1951), Argentine actress, vedette
- Alma Rosa Aguirre (1929–2025), Mexican actress
- Amber Aguirre (born 1958), American ceramic sculptor
- Ann Aguirre, American speculative fiction author
- Arantxa Aguirre, Spanish film director
- Carmen Aguirre, Canadian and Chilean actor, playwright, and writer
- Celso Aguirre Bernal (1916–1997), Mexican writer and historian
- Forrest Aguirre, American fantasy and horror author
- Francisco de Aguirre (painter) (fl. 1646), Spanish Baroque painter
- Francisco de Paula Aguirre (1875–1939), Venezuelan composer
- Ignacio Aguirre (1900–1990), Mexican engraver
- Margarita Aguirre (1925–2003), Chilean writer
- Maricarmen Arrigorriaga Aguirre (born 1957), Chilean television and film actress
- Memo Aguirre (born 1951), Chilean singer
- Ricardo Aguirre (1939–1969), Venezuelan musician
- Roberto Aguirre-Sacasa, American writer
- Rosa Aguirre (1908–1981), Filipino actress
- Rosy Aguirre, Mexican voice actress
- Rubén Aguirre (1934–2016), Mexican actor

=== Politics ===
- Amado Aguirre Santiago (1863–1949), Mexican general and politician
- Eduardo Aguirre (diplomat) (born 1946), former United States Ambassador to Spain
- Elfego Hernán Monzón Aguirre (1912–1981), Guatemalan army officer and politician
- Elias Aguirre (born 1984), Swedish politician
- Esperanza Aguirre (born 1952), Spanish politician
- Gonzalo Aguirre (1940–2021), Uruguayan politician
- José Antonio Aguirre (politician) (1904–1960), Basque politician and footballer
- José Joaquín Aguirre (1822–1901), Chilean physician and politician
- Juan Pedro Julián Aguirre y López de Anaya (1781–1837), Argentine politician
- Juana Aguirre Luco (1877–1963), First Lady of Chile, wife of President Pedro Aguirre Cerda
- Mike Aguirre (born 1949), American politician
- Paloma Aguirre, American conservationist and politician
- Pamela Aguirre Zambonino (born 1984), Ecuadorian lawyer and politician
- Pedro Aguirre Cerda (1879–1941), President of Chile 1938–1941
- Rhina Aguirre (1939–2020), Bolivian politician and disability activist
- Roberto Aguirre Solís (born 1957), Mexican politician
- Salvador Aguirre (Honduras), Honduran politician
- Vitaliano Aguirre II, Filipino lawyer and justice minister

=== Sports ===
- Carlos Aguirre (equestrian) (born 1952), Mexican Olympic equestrian
- Carlos Aguirre (volleyball) (born 1938), Mexican Olympic volleyball player
- Damaris Gabriela Aguirre (born 1977), Mexican Olympic weightlifter
- David Álvarez Aguirre (born 1984), naturalized Equatoguinean footballer
- Facundo Aguirre (born 1985), Argentine Olympic Alpine skier
- Francisco Aguirre Matos Mancebo (born 1970), Dominican baseball player and coach
- Gaizka Garitano Aguirre (born 1975), Basque football midfielder
- Gastón Aguirre (born 1981), Argentine football defender
- Gustavo Aguirre (born 1977), Argentine Olympic runner
- Hank Aguirre (1931–1994), American baseball pitcher
- Javier Aguirre (born 1958), Mexican football defender and coach
- Jeinkler Aguirre (born 1990), Cuban Olympic diver
- Jesús Aguirre (athlete) (1902–1954), Mexican Olympic athlete
- Jorge Aguirre (athlete), Mexican Olympic athlete
- Jorge Aguirre (judoka) (1962–2025), Argentine Olympic judoka
- José Luis Aguirre (born 1967), Spanish Olympic rower
- Juan Aguirre (rower) (born 1970), Spanish Olympic rower
- Julio César Aguirre (born 1969), Colombian road cyclist
- Luis Aguirre (1911–?), Argentine Olympic sailor, brother of Rolando
- Mark Aguirre (born 1959), American basketball player
- Mason Aguirre (born 1987), American snowboarder
- Molly Aguirre (born 1984), American professional snowboarder
- Nicolás Aguirre (basketball) (born 1988), Argentine professional basketball player
- Nicolás Aguirre (footballer) (born 1990), Argentine football midfielder
- Ordan Aguirre (born 1955), Venezuelan footballer
- Roberto Aguirre (footballer) (born 1942), Argentine footballer
- Roberto Aguirre (football manager) (born 1968), Spanish football manager
- Rolando Aguirre (1904–1994), Argentine Olympic sailor, brother of Luis
- William Aguirre (born 1962), Nicaraguan Olympic runner

=== Others ===
- Álvaro Coutinho Aguirre (1899–1987), Brazilian agronomist, zoologist and naturalist
- Carl and Clarence Aguirre (born 2002), former conjoined twins, from Philippines
- Felipe Aguirre Franco (born 1934), Mexican Roman Catholic archbishop
- Francisco de Aguirre (conquistador) (1508–1581), Spanish conquistador of Chile
- Gary J. Aguirre, American securities lawyer and investigator
- Gonzalo Aguirre Beltrán (1908–1996), Mexican anthropologist
- José Antonio Aguirre (early Californian) (1799–1860), Spanish settler in Alta California
- Joseph Saenz de Aguirre (1630–1699), Spanish cardinal
- Lope de Aguirre (c. 1510–1561), Basque conquistador
- Marcelo Aguirre (disambiguation), several people
- Mary Bernard Aguirre (1844–1906), American educator
- Osmín Aguirre y Salinas (1889–1977), Salvadoran military officer
- Pedro de Aguirre, Spanish explorer of San Antonio, Texas, in the 18th century
- Pilar Zabala Aguirre (born 1951), Spanish researcher, writer, and professor

== See also ==
- Roberto Aguire (born 1988), Mexican actor and producer
