= Carlos Aguirre =

Carlos Aguirre may refer to:

- Carlos Aguirre (equestrian) (born 1952), Mexican Olympic equestrian
- Carlos Aguirre (volleyball) (born 1938), Mexican Olympic volleyball player
- Carlos Aguirre (musician) (born 1965), Argentinian musician.
- Carlos Aguirre Rojas (born 1955), Mexican historian.
