= Fernando Campero =

Bolivian politician (born 1953)

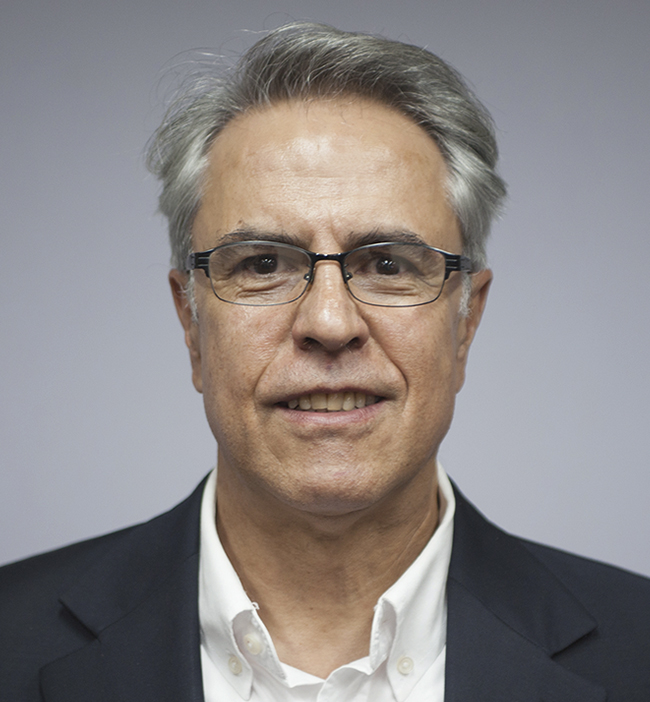
- Official portrait, 2015

Substitute Senator for Tarija
- In office 23 January 2015 – 3 November 2020
- Senator: Mirtha Arce
- Preceded by: Dora Burgos
- Succeeded by: Luis Casso

Personal details
- Born: Fernando Campero Paz; 20 March 1953 (age 73) Tarija, Bolivia
- Party: National Unity Front (2009–present)
- Other political affiliations: Revolutionary Nationalist Movement (before 1989); Revolutionary Left Movement (1989–1993)
- Relatives: Paz family
- Education: Bolivian Catholic University
- Occupation: Economist; politician

Fernando Campero Paz (born 20 March 1953) is a Bolivian economist and politician who served as substitute senator for Tarija from 2015 to 2020. He previously served as general manager of the Central Bank of Bolivia and the Bolivian Stock Exchange during the administration of Jaime Paz Zamora.

Born into the prominent Paz family of Tarija, Campero was raised in a highly politicized environment, closely connected to the happenings in the Revolutionary Nationalist Movement, the party of his uncle, Víctor Paz Estenssoro. Sympathetic to leftist currents, Campero split from his family's party in favor of the Revolutionary Left Movement, serving in the Paz Zamora administration as general manager of the country's Central Bank and Stock Exchange.

Following a long political retirement, Campero returned to the electoral scene in 2009, seeking a seat in the Chamber of Deputies on behalf of the National Unity Front. Though unsuccessful in that endeavor, he remained active within the party's ranks, serving as its regional leader in Tarija. He saw more electoral success in the next cycle, winning a seat as a substitute senator in 2014.

== Early life and career ==
=== Early life and education ===
Fernando Campero was born on 20 March 1953 in Tarija, the youngest of four siblings born to Raúl Campero Trigo, a Chaco War veteran, and Alina Paz Estenssoro, daughter of Tarija Senator Domingo Paz Rojas. Campero was raised in a deeply political family, entrenched within the party structure of the Revolutionary Nationalist Movement (MNR)—the dominant political force at the time of his birth. His father was head of the party in Tarija, while on his mother's side, Campero was the nephew of Víctor Paz Estenssoro, the MNR's historic leader and founder, then serving his first of four eventual terms as president of the republic.

Campero and his siblings spent their early childhoods in Barcelona, where their father had been designated consul. He studied political economics in Chile during the family's exile there, and upon his return, attended the Bolivian Catholic University, during which time he played an active role in the anti-authoritarian student movement, in force during the country's democratic transition.

=== Political shift and banking career ===
For many of the MNR's older members—termed movimientistas—the retirement of Paz Estenssoro at the end of his fourth term in 1989 after almost half a century at the helm of the party was a turning point. In the ensuing leadership contest, many in the Campero family backed Guillermo Bedregal, who lost in his bid to liberal mining magnate Gonzalo Sánchez de Lozada. Though some—like Campero's brother, Javier—accepted the new leadership and continued prosperous political careers within the MNR, Fernando balked at the idea: "... it seem[ed] outrageous to me that the richest man in Bolivia could be head of the party that carried out the National Revolution."

Distanced from the MNR, Campero joined the Revolutionary Left Movement (MIR), led by Jaime Paz Zamora—himself a distant maternal relative with added familial links to the Camperos. Following Paz Zamora's election to the presidency, Campero was brought on to the administration as general manager of the Bolivian Stock Exchange as well as manager of economic studies and general manager of the Central Bank of Bolivia. Fernando joined a number of other family members in working for the MIR government, including his brother, Gonzalo—president of Lloyd Aéreo Boliviano (1989–1992) and ambassador to France (1992–1993)—and cousin, Fernando Campero Prudencio—minister of exports (1992–1993).

== Chamber of Senators ==
=== Election ===
Following his tenure in the Paz Zamora administration, Campero stepped back from active political life. He made his return in 2009 at the call of businessman Samuel Doria Medina, who invited him to join the National Unity Front (UN), a party born of a fraction of the now-extinct MIR. Campero was nominated to contest Tarija's circumscription 45 (Cercado), his first candidacy since 1989, when the MIR ran him for a seat in the Chamber of Deputies.

Though relegated to a distant third place in 2009, Campero remained active within UN, eventually rising to become the party's regional leader in Tarija. In 2014, UN ratified its support for its leading cadres—even in cases where they had previously lost races—placing them in prominent positions on the party's electoral lists. Campero was nominated to accompany Mirtha Arce as a candidate for Senate; the pair won the seat.

=== Tenure ===
Campero's tenure in the Senate was characteristic of many substitute legislators, focused primarily on regional matters, whereas their primary counterparts spent most of their time legislating from the capital. As head of UN in Tarija, Campero spent much of early 2015 working to construct a unified opposition bloc to contest that year's general elections. The effort was only partially successful, with UN reaching agreements with Adrián Oliva, who won the governorship, while Tarija Mayor Oscar Montes ran his own campaign in the municipalities, conserving the capital mayoralty. In any case, Oliva soon distanced himself from UN, and the party lost much of its influence on the governor's cabinet.

Absent from the 2019 and 2020 elections as a product of UN's withdrawal from both contests, Campero concluded his term in parliament and retired to Tarija, where he played a minor role in restructuring UN's regional alliances, this time backing Montes's gubernatorial aspirations over Oliva's reelection bid. This time, the pact held firm far longer into the new governor's term.

=== Commission assignments ===
- Constitution, Human Rights, Legislation, and Electoral System Commission
  - Electoral System, Human Rights, and Social Equity Committee (2015–2017)
- Plural Justice, Prosecutor's Office, and Legal Defense of the State Commission
  - Prosecutor's Office and Legal Defense of the State Committee (2018–2019)
- Territorial Organization of the State and Autonomies Commission (2017–2018, 2019–2020)

== Electoral history ==
Electoral history of Fernando Campero
Year	Office	Party	Alliance	Votes			Result	Ref.
Year	Office	Party	Alliance	Total	%	P.	Result	Ref.
1989	Deputy	Revolutionary Left Movement		16,124	23.96%	3rd	Lost	(Note: Presented on an electoral list. The data shown represents the share of the vote the entire party/alliance received in that constituency.)
2009	Deputy	National Unity Front	Consensus and National Unity	4,586	9.21%	3rd	Lost	
2014	Sub. Senator	National Unity Front	Democratic Unity	69,989	26.59%	2nd	Won	
Source: Plurinational Electoral Organ | Electoral Atlas

== Publications ==
- Campero Paz, Fernando; Baldivia Urdininea, José (1987). Ciudades Intermedias (in Spanish). La Paz: Instituto Latinoamericano de Investigaciones Sociales. OCLC 318233691.
- ——————————; Quiroga, Jorge (1992). Healy, Kevin; Hunt, Shane J.; Fischer, Stanley (eds.). Reviewing Bolivia's Economic Transformation. Washington, D.C.: Latin American Program, Woodrow Wilson Center. OCLC 27638832.
- —————————— (1994). El Mercado de Capitales en Bolivia (in Spanish). La Paz: Instituto Latinoamericano de Investigaciones Sociales. OCLC 32885602.
- ——————————; Requena, Mario; Evia, José Luis (1997). Prospectiva de la Economía Boliviana: Servicios, Industria e Hidrocarburos (in Spanish). La Paz: Fundación Friedrich Ebert; Instituto Latinoamericano de Investigaciones Sociales. OCLC 39139464.

Senate of Bolivia
Preceded by Dora Burgos	Substitute Senator for Tarija; 2015–2020; Served alongside: Teresa Miranda, Henry Chávez, Rosario Rodríguez	Succeeded by Luis Casso
