= Mirtha Arce =

Bolivian politician (born 1963)

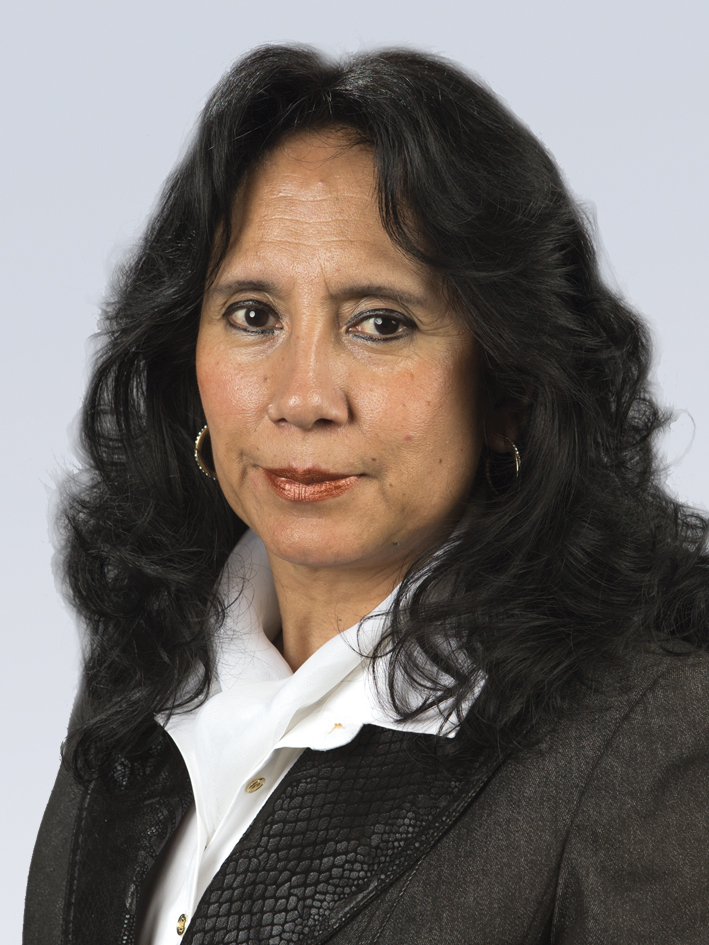
- Official portrait, 2018

Senator for Tarija
- In office 18 January 2015 – 3 November 2020
- Substitute: Fernando Campero
- Preceded by: Marcelo Antezana
- Succeeded by: Gladys Alarcón

Member of the Chamber of Deputies from Tarija
- Substitute
- In office 25 January 2010 – 14 July 2014
- Deputy: Adrián Oliva
- Preceded by: Rodolfo Vargas
- Succeeded by: Lorena Gareca
- Constituency: Party list

Personal details
- Born: Mirtha Natividad Arce Camacho; 25 December 1963 (age 62) Tarija, Bolivia
- Education: Marshal Sucre Normal School; Juan Misael Saracho University
- Occupation: Educator; lawyer; politician

Mirtha Natividad Arce Camacho (born 25 December 1963) is a Bolivian academic, lawyer, and politician who served as senator for Tarija from 2015 to 2020.

Arce got her political start in student leadership before developing her career in academia and women's rights activism. She held multiple executive positions in women's rights–related organizations in Tarija, including presiding over the Association of Women Lawyers and the Association of Women University Professionals. Between 2002 and 2008, she held law-related public service roles at local and departmental levels, including serving as legal director of the Departmental Road Service of Tarija.

In 2009, Arce was elected to the Chamber of Deputies, accompanying Adrián Oliva as his substitute from 2010 to 2014 when she resigned to launch a successful bid for a seat in the Senate. Though elected as part of the Democratic Unity coalition, Arce became estranged from the bloc partway through her term and operated as an independent from then on. In 2021, she contested the Tarija governorship, becoming the first woman nominee in the department's electoral history. However, she came in a distant fourth place at the ballot box.

== Early life and career ==
Mirtha Arce was born on 25 December 1963 in Tarija, to Rosandel Arce Gonzales and Ana Camacho Gallardo. Arce completed her secondary schooling at the Santa Ana School, where she served as class president. She went on to attend the Marshal Sucre Normal School as well as Juan Misael Saracho University (UAJMS), where she graduated as a lawyer and teacher, completing two master's degrees in crime science and higher education and five postgraduate degrees in the fields of educational research and university teaching.

During her time in university, Arce continued to be active in student leadership, serving for two terms as executive of the UAJMS Law Student Center, where she was its first female head. From there, she went on to form part of her Local University Federation and the Bolivian University Confederation and was named executive of the Bermejo Teachers Federation.

Arce developed much of her career in academia, starting out as a university professor at UAJMS and the Bolivian Catholic University's Tarija campus. She was a founding member and president of the Association of Women Lawyers and the Association of Women University Professionals, served as vice president of the Tarija Women's Civic Committee, and composed part of the directorate of the National Confederation of Women's Institutes of Bolivia. Starting in 2002, Arce began a career in public service, serving as deputy prosecutor for controlled substances until 2005, when she joined the Cercado Province as its chief legal advisor. In 2006, she joined the administration of Mario Cossío, Tarija's first popularly elected prefect, serving as legal director of the Departmental Road Service until 2008.

== Chamber of Deputies ==
=== Election ===
Arce's political ideology has been described as "liberal in economics" but "conservative in morals". She was an early supporter of departmental autonomy, a political system heavily pushed by the country's lowland departments in the early 2000s. Despite her lack of party affiliation, Arce's adherence to decentralization and prominence in women's rights organizations contributed to her nomination for a seat in the Chamber of Deputies in 2009. She accompanied Adrián Oliva as his substitute, topping the National Convergence alliance's electoral list in the department.

=== Tenure ===
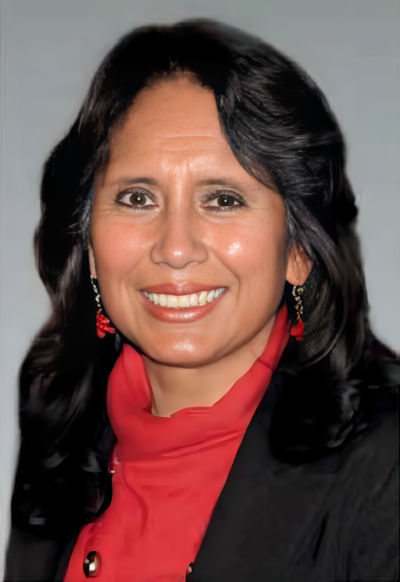
Official portrait, 2014

In parliament, Arce accompanied Oliva during his four terms on the lower chamber's Energy and Hydrocarbons Committee between 2010 and 2014, in addition to spending a few months on the Planning, Economic Policy, and Finance Commission in her final year.^{[§]} The majority of her tenure, however, reflected that of many substitute parliamentarians, focusing less on legislating from the capital and more on fostering local connections in her home department.

=== Commission assignments ===
- Planning, Economic Policy, and Finance Commission
  - Budget, Tax Policy, and Comptroller's Office Committee (2014)
- Plural Economy, Production, and Industry Commission
  - Energy and Hydrocarbons Committee (2010–2014)

== Chamber of Senators ==
=== Election ===
Nearing the end of her term in the Chamber of Deputies, Arce resigned from office to contest a seat in the Senate. She aligned herself with Samuel Doria Medina's Democratic Unity coalition, a bloc that recycled much of National Convergence's previous electoral list in a bid to guarantee a high degree of parliamentary representation. Benefitting from a favorable position at the top of her alliance's electoral list, Arce won the seat, becoming Democratic Unity's only senator in the department.

=== Tenure ===
Sworn in the following January, Arce spent her first year heading the Senate's Electoral System, Human Rights, and Social Equity Committee. Even as she exercised leadership over a key parliamentary post in the field of women's rights, Arce often found herself contending with machista currents within her own caucus, an issue that ultimately led to her estrangement from the opposition alliance. These internal divisions culminated in 2016 when Arce refused to chair a committee her caucus had assigned to her, opting instead to seek a position on the Senate's powerful Ethics Commission. With the supporting votes of legislators from the ruling Movement for Socialism, Arce obtained the post, beating out the candidate nominated by the rest of the Democratic Unity caucus. The following year, Arce officialized her break from the alliance with which she was elected. For the duration of her term, she operated as an independent, unaffiliated with any of the Senate's three parliamentary caucuses.

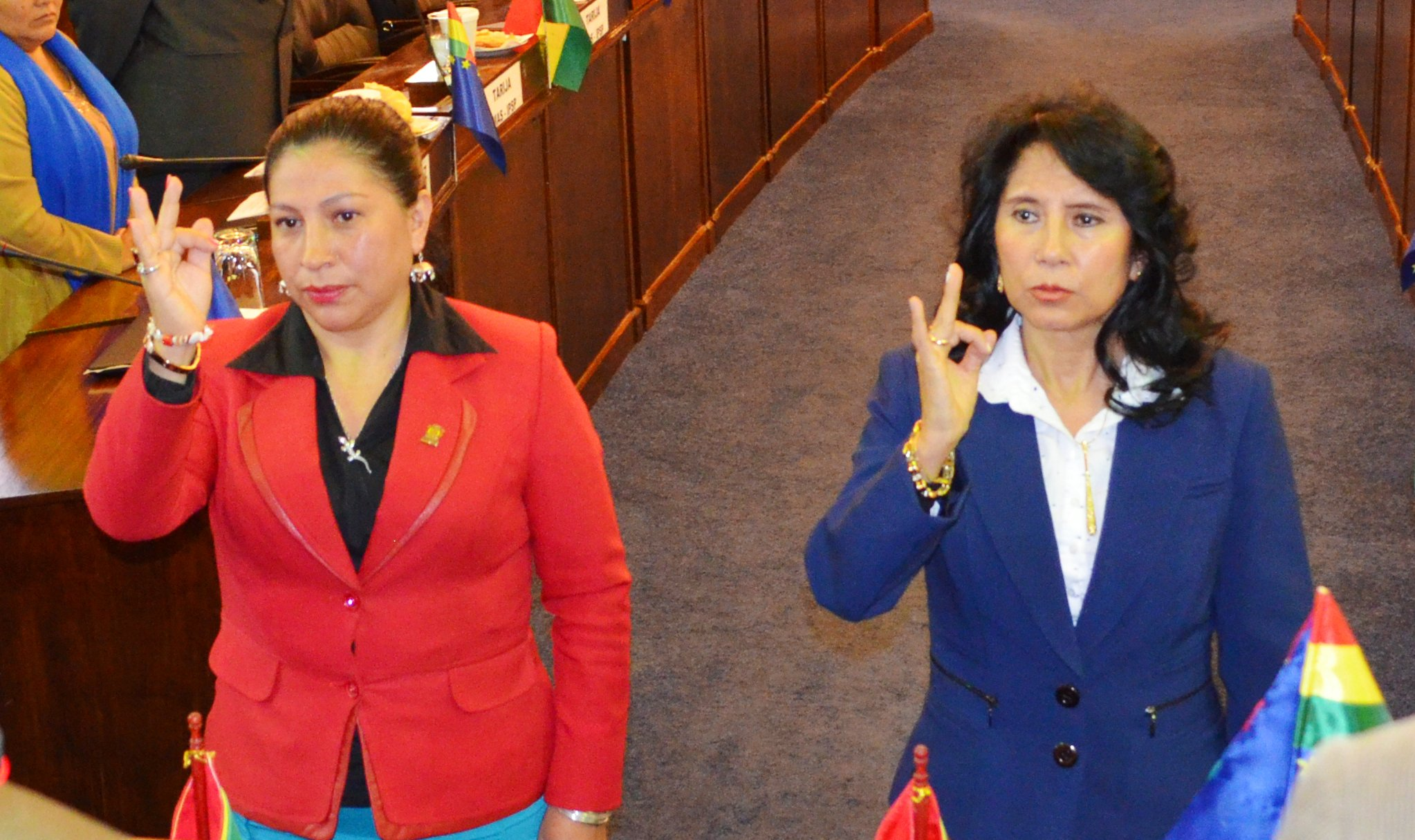
Arce and her colleague are sworn into the Ethics Commission.

=== Commission assignments ===
- Constitution, Human Rights, Legislation, and Electoral System Commission
  - Electoral System, Human Rights, and Social Equity Committee (Secretary: 2015–2017)
- Plural Justice, Prosecutor's Office, and Legal Defense of the State Commission
  - Prosecutor's Office and Legal Defense of the State Committee (Secretary: 2018–2019)
- Territorial Organization of the State and Autonomies Commission (President: 2017–2018, 2019–2020)
- Ethics and Transparency Commission (2016–2017)

== Tarija gubernatorial campaign ==
Soon after the conclusion of her senatorial term, Arce jumped onto the campaign trail, announcing a bid for the Tarija governorship. Though initially invited to be the Christian Democratic Party's nominee, Arce instead registered her candidacy with a local party: Integration, Security, and Autonomy. Of the candidates contesting the governorship in Tarija, Arce stood out as the only woman, making her the first woman to do so in the department's electoral history, as well as one of just seven women nationwide nominated to run in gubernatorial elections that cycle. Of the participating parties, Arce's campaign represented the most conservative segments of Tarija society, a fact she did little to disguise or grow past. According to journalist Miguel V. de Torres, this factor—in addition to her campaign's comparatively low budget—made it difficult for her to "find any space in which to fish for votes that are not [already] hers". Arce found herself unable to gain significant traction, and she ultimately lost the election, finishing in a distant fourth place.

== Electoral history ==
Electoral history of Mirtha Arce
| Year | Office | Alliance | Votes | | | Result | Ref. |
| Year | Office | Alliance | Total | % | P. | Result | Ref. |
|---|---|---|---|---|---|---|---|
| 2009 | Substitute deputy | National Convergence | 85,840 | 38.28% | 2nd | Won | (Note: Presented on an electoral list. The data shown represents the share of the vote the entire party/alliance received in that constituency.) |
| 2014 | Senator | Democratic Unity | 69,989 | 26.59% | 2nd | Won | |
| 2021 | Governor | Integration, Security, and Autonomy | 6,636 | 2.27% | 4th | Lost | |
Source: Plurinational Electoral Organ | Electoral Atlas

== Publications ==
- Arce Camacho, Mirtha N. (2001). Mujer y avances legislativos en Bolivia (in Spanish). Tarija: Talleres de Edición Luis de Fuentes.
- ——————————— (2004). El Ministerio Público (in Spanish). Tarija: Talleres de Edición Luis de Fuentes.

Chamber of Deputies of Bolivia
| Preceded by Rodolfo Vargas | Substitute Member of the Chamber of Deputies from Tarija; 2010–2014 | Succeeded by Lorena Gareca |
Senate of Bolivia
| Preceded by Marcelo Antezana | Senator for Tarija; 2015–2020; Served alongside: Milciades Peñaloza, Noemi Díaz, Víctor Hugo Zamora | Succeeded by Gladys Alarcón |
