= Rhina Aguirre =

Bolivian politician (1939–2021)

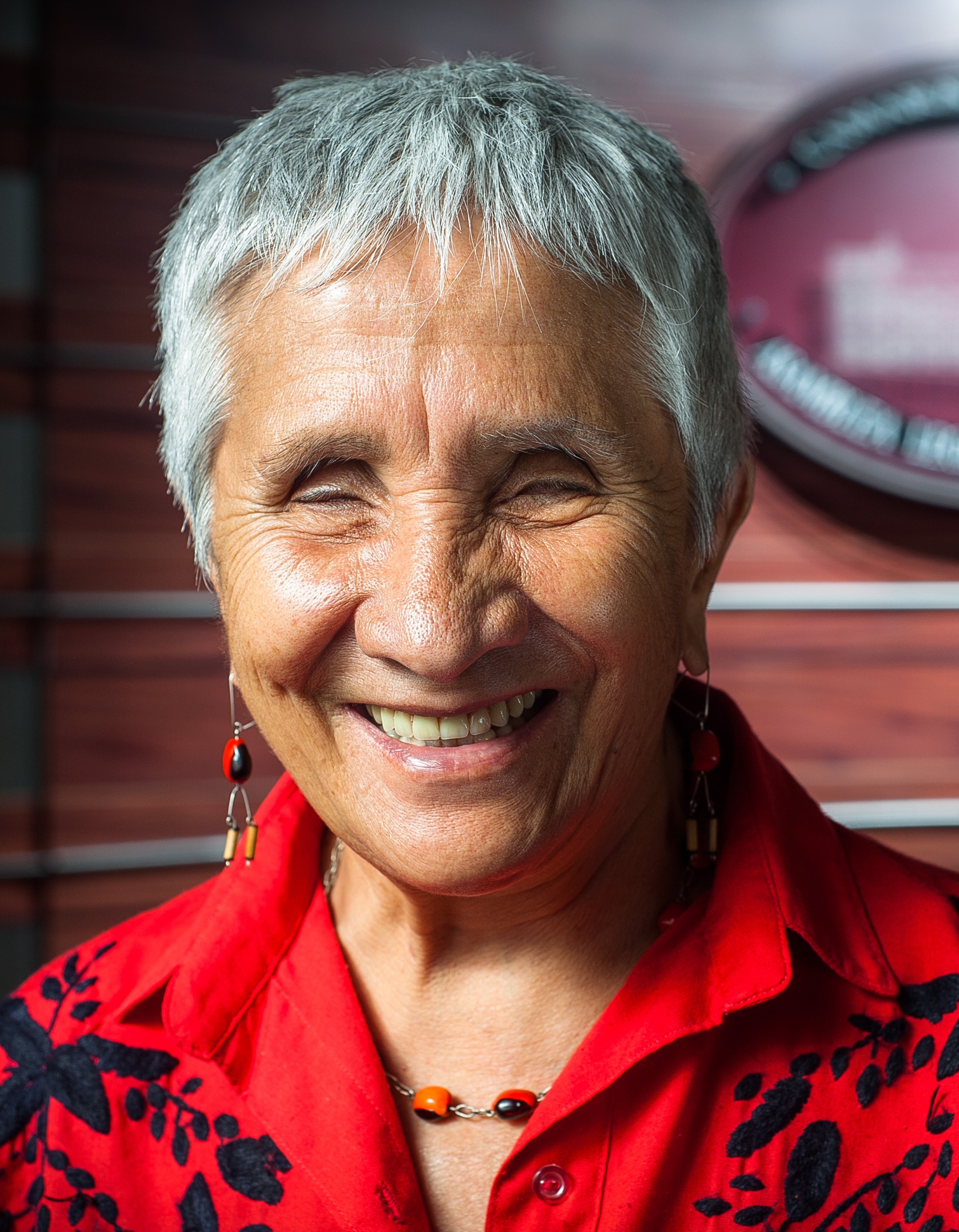
- Official portrait, 2014

Senator for Tarija
- In office 19 January 2010 – 18 January 2015
- Substitute: Darío Gareca (2010–2012); Félix Bolívar (2012–2015)
- Preceded by: Roberto Ruiz
- Succeeded by: Milciades Peñaloza

Personal details
- Born: Rhina Aguirre Amézaga; 20 May 1939 Tarija, Bolivia
- Died: 30 October 2021 (aged 82)
- Party: Movement for Socialism
- Spouse: Carlos Samaniego
- Occupation: Educator; politician; sociologist

Rhina Aguirre Amézaga (20 May 1939 – 30 October 2021) was a Bolivian disability activist, politician, and sociologist who served as senator for Tarija from 2010 to 2015.

Aguirre studied education while undergoing the novitiate at the Santa Ana School. Though she retired before making her perpetual vows, she remained influenced by the concepts of liberation theology, which unites Christian doctrine with left-wing political positions. An opponent of the military dictatorships of the 1970s and '80s, Aguirre was an early activist in the country's human rights movement.

Exiled to Ecuador by the García Meza regime, she collaborated with Leonidas Proaño's Indigenous Ministry and worked closely with the country's peasant and social movement organizations. Blinded in both eyes by toxoplasmosis, Aguirre took up the cause of disability rights, joining the Departmental Council for Disabled Persons upon her return to Bolivia. In 2009, she joined the Movement for Socialism and was elected to represent Tarija in the Senate, becoming the first blind person in Bolivian history to assume a parliamentary seat.

== Early life and career ==
=== Early life and education ===
Rhina was born on 20 May 1939 in Tarija to Humberto Aguirre Aoiz, an artisan jeweler and Chaco War veteran from Sucre, and Lucía Amézaga de Ameller, a woman from Camargo. The eldest of three siblings, Aguirre spent her childhood in relative poverty, raised primarily by her father and stepmother, her birth mother having died when Aguirre was 5 years old. Aguirre's father made a living operating a small watch shop in the city. A communist, well-read on the theories of Marxism–Leninism, Humberto Aguirre instilled in his daughter a sense of class consciousness and educated her on the need to combat social inequality:

I didn't understand much of what he was saying [at the time] ... I didn't like that word (fighting). I imagined those wrestling shows ... My dad explained to me that it wasn't about that kind of fight, but about constant movement and work; he exhorted me to read, to inform myself.

— Rhina Aguirre

Aguirre completed her primary and secondary schooling at the Santa Ana School, a religious institute run by the nunnery. She studied education there and eventually joined the school's staff as a professor and later its director. During this time, Aguirre also underwent the novitiate, though she ultimately opted not to take the final vows. Even so, her experience with the nuns led her to become an adherent of liberation theology, which synthesized Christian beliefs with left-wing ideological values. She applied these concepts to her profession as an educator, becoming a proponent of faith-based alternative and adult education. In that vein, she also worked in radio, collaborating with the Loyola Cultural Action Foundation to produce educational programs.

=== Political activism ===
In tandem with her other activities, Aguirre studied sociology and practiced social work. A staunch opponent of the military governments of the day, she became an early activist in the country's nascent human rights movement and was a founding member of the Permanent Assembly of Human Rights in 1970. Forced into exile for her political activism against the García Meza regime, Aguirre took refuge in Ecuador, where she collaborated with Bishop Leonidas Proaño's Indigenous Ministry in Riobamba. Later, she moved to Quito, where she worked alongside local peasant and social movement organizations. Finally settling in Puyo, Aguirre was brought on as a public official in the municipality's Department of Culture. Around this time, Aguirre contracted toxoplasmosis, a parasitic disease transmitted by cats. By 1983, the condition had left her entirely blind in both eyes.

With the reestablishment of democracy in Bolivia, Aguirre returned to Tarija, where she once again dedicated herself to activism in the field of human rights. In the absence of the hard-right military dictatorships of the 1970s and '80s, many of Bolivia's human rights activists re-oriented themselves in opposition to the neoliberal economics of the new democratic governments, which dismantled many of the country's state-run social services. For her part, Aguirre focused her efforts on disability rights, joining the Departmental Council for Disabled Persons in 2000, where she served as the organization's head of health and education.

== Chamber of Senators ==
=== Election ===
In 2009, public recognition for her work led the ruling Movement for Socialism (MAS-IPSP) to invite Aguirre to join the party's slate of candidates in the Tarija Department. Though initially hesitant, Aguirre accepted the nomination and was elected alongside singer Juan Enrique Jurado as one of the MAS's two senators for that department. In doing so, she became the first blind person ever to occupy a parliamentary seat in Bolivian history.

=== Tenure ===
Throughout her senatorial term, Aguirre continued to promote legislation in favor of disabled persons, actions that bore fruit with the 2012 passage of the General Law on Persons with Disabilities, which promoted the sector's access to employment, equal opportunity, and social inclusion. Upon the conclusion of her term, Aguirre was not nominated for reelection but remained active in politics, holding the vice presidency of the MAS's Tarija affiliate for some time.

=== Commission assignments ===
- Constitution, Human Rights, Legislation, and Electoral System Commission
  - Constitution, Legislation, and Legislative and Constitutional Interpretation Committee (Secretary: 2011–2012)
- Territorial Organization of the State and Autonomies Commission (President: 2013–2015)
- Rural Native Indigenous Peoples and Nations and Interculturality Commission (President: 2010–2011)
- Social Policy, Education, and Health Commission
  - Education, Health, Science, Technology, and Sports Committee (Secretary: 2012–2013)

== Personal life and death ==
While in exile, Aguirre met Carlos Samaniego, an Ecuadorian sociologist from Loja, whom she married. A partisan of the Communist Party of Ecuador, Samaniego accompanied his wife on her return to Bolivia, where he joined the MAS; in 2010, he was appointed ombudsman of Tarija, and he later served as departmental coordinator of the Ministry of Autonomies in Tarija. On account of her toxoplasmosis, Aguirre suffered several miscarriages in her attempts to have children, a situation that led her to choose adoption. Her son, Carlos Saúl Samaniego, was born in Vilcabamba and studied industrial engineering in Ecuador.

Aguirre died on 30 October 2021, aged 82. Her death was commemorated by the Chamber of Senators, which issued an official posthumous recognition of her work two days after her death.

== Electoral history ==
Electoral history of Rhina Aguirre
Year	Office	Party	Votes			Result	Ref.
Year	Office	Party	Total	%	P.	Result	Ref.
2009	Senator	Movement for Socialism	114,577	51.09%	1st	Won	(Note: Presented on an electoral list. The data shown represents the share of the vote the entire party/alliance received in that constituency.)
Source: Plurinational Electoral Organ | Electoral Atlas

Senate of Bolivia
Preceded by Roberto Ruiz	Senator for Tarija; 2010–2015; Served alongside: Juan Enrique Jurado, Marcelo Antezana, María Elena Méndez	Succeeded by Milciades Peñaloza
