= Pilar Zabala Aguirre =

Prof. Pilar Zabala Aguirre
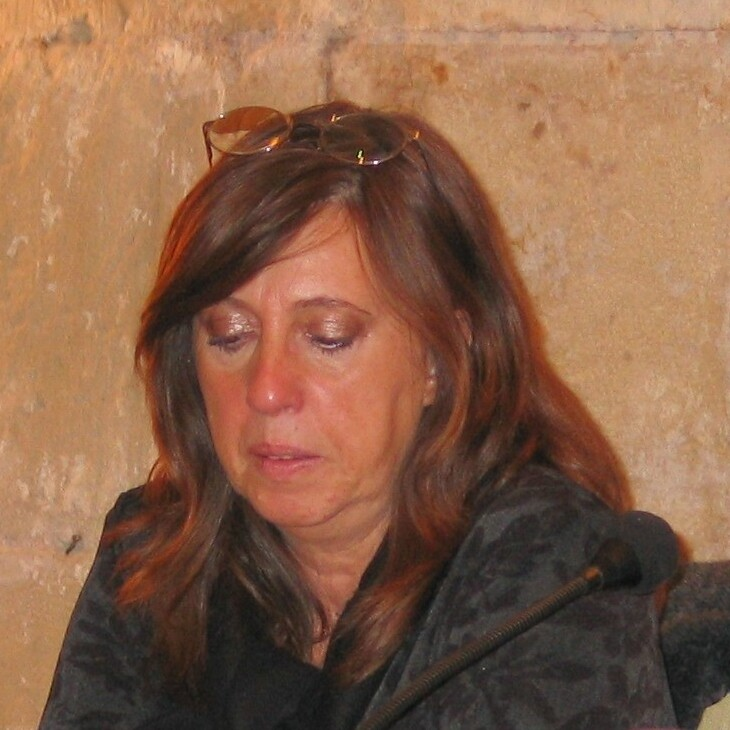
- Pilar Zabala (2005)
- Born: María Pilar Zabala Aguirre; 13 October 1951 (age 75); Legazpi, Gipuzkoa, Spain
- Occupations: researcher; writer; professor

Academic background
- Education: Ph.D.
- Alma mater: University of Cantabria
- Thesis: 'Política fiscal y Administración de Alcabalas en la Corona de Castilla en el Siglo XVI' (1991)
- Doctoral advisor: José Ignacio Fortea

Academic work
- Institutions: Universidad Autónoma de Yucatán

Pilar Zabala Aguirre (Legazpi, Gipuzkoa, 13 October 1951) is a Spanish researcher, writer, and professor at the Universidad Autónoma de Yucatán. Her research interests include taxation in Castile during the 16th century, the colonial history of Yucatán, and the culture of the Basque exile generated by the Spanish Civil War of 1936.

== Biography ==
María Pilar Zabala Aguirre was born in the town of Legazpi. Shortly after her birth, the family moved to San Sebastián, the capital of Gipuzkoa, where she spent his childhood and adolescence. Later, she moved to Santander, where she studied Philosophy and Letters, specializing in History and Geography (1988). In 1991, directed by Professor José Ignacio Fortea, she presented her doctoral thesis Política fiscal y Administración de Alcabalas en la Corona de Castilla en el Siglo XVI, a reference work in this specialty, and received her Ph.D. in history from the University of Cantabria (Spain).

She is a specialist in taxation in Castile during the 16th century and in the colonial history of Yucatán. Likewise, she is interested in the culture of the Basque exile generated by the Spanish Civil War of 1936. She belongs to the Asociación Hamaika Bide (Association for the Study of Basque Exiles). Since 1999, she has been residing in Mérida, a tenured professor at the Universidad Autónoma de Yucatán. She is a Level I National Researcher within the Mexican university system. She is the author of several publications.

== Selected works ==
=== Books ===
- Las alcabalas y la hacienda real en Castilla: siglo XVI. Santander: Universidad de Cantabria, 2000. 349 p. ISBN 978-84-8102-229-2

=== Co-written books ===
- En colaboración con Vera Tiesler & Andrea Cucina: Natives, europeans, and africans in colonial Campeche. History and Archaeology. Florida (Estados Unidos): University Press of Florida, 2010. 255 p. ISBN 978-0-8130-3492-8
- En colaboración con Vera Tiesler: Orígenes de la sociedad campechana. Vida y muerte en la ciudad de Campeche durante los siglos XVI y XVII. Mérida: Ediciones de la Universidad Autónoma de Yucatán, 2012.
- En colaboración con Pedro Miranda Ojeda, Genny M. Negroe & Guadalupe del C. Camara: Élites, familia y honor en el Yucatán Colonial. Secretaría Cultura y Artes del Gobierno del Estado de Yucatán - Universidad Autónoma de Yucatán, 2015. ISBN 978-607-9405-56-4 287 p.

=== Articles in books ===
- "Fiscalidad y sociedad en la cornisa cantábrica durante el reinado de Felipe II" en Antonio Mantecón Movellán (coord.) De peñas al mar: sociedad e instituciones en la Cantabria moderna. Santander: 1999. ISBN 978-84-86993-31-3 p. 27-45.
- "La palabra de Aurora Arnaiz" en José Ramón Zabala Aguirre (coord.) Non zeuden emakumeak? La mujer vasca en el exilio de 1936. San Sebastián: Saturrarán, 2007. ISBN 978-84-934455-2-2 p. 495-518.
- "El pensamiento y la práctica pedagógica en Aurora Arnaiz Amigo" en José Ángel Ascunce, Mónica Jato & María Luisa San Miguel: Exilio y Universidad (1936-1955), tomo II. San Sebastián: Saturrarán, ISBN 978-84-934455-4-6 p. 1245-1258.
- "Isotopic Studies of Human Skeletal Remains from a Sixteenth to Seventeenth Century AD Churchyard in Campeche, Mexico" en AAVV: Current anthropology: A world journal of the sciences of man 4: 396–433. ISSN 0011-3204, 2012
- "La presencia africana en Yucatán. Siglos XVI y XVII" en Vera Tiesler y Pilar Zabala: Orígenes de la sociedad campechana. Vida y muerte en la ciudad de Campeche durante los siglos XVI y XVII. Mérida: Ediciones de la Universidad Autónoma de Yucatán, 2012 p. 195-224.

=== Articles in other publications ===
- "Esclavitud, asimilación y mestizaje de negros urbanos durante la Colonia" en Arqueología Mexicana, monográfico dedicado a "Las raíces africanas en México” ISSN 0188-8218, Vol. 21, N.º. 119 (ene-feb), 2013 p. 36-39.
- “Fuentes para el análisis de las prácticas funerarias en el Nuevo Mundo, siglos XVI-XVIII". Temas antropológicos: Revista científica de investigaciones regionales 22 (2): 190–207, ISSN 1405-843X 2000,
- "Fuentes para el estudio de los sacrificios humanos en la época colonial". Temas antropológicos: Revista científica de investigaciones regionales 31 (1): 5-21 ISSN 1405-843X 2009.

== See also ==
- Basque Mexicans
