= Legazpi, Gipuzkoa =

Legazpi
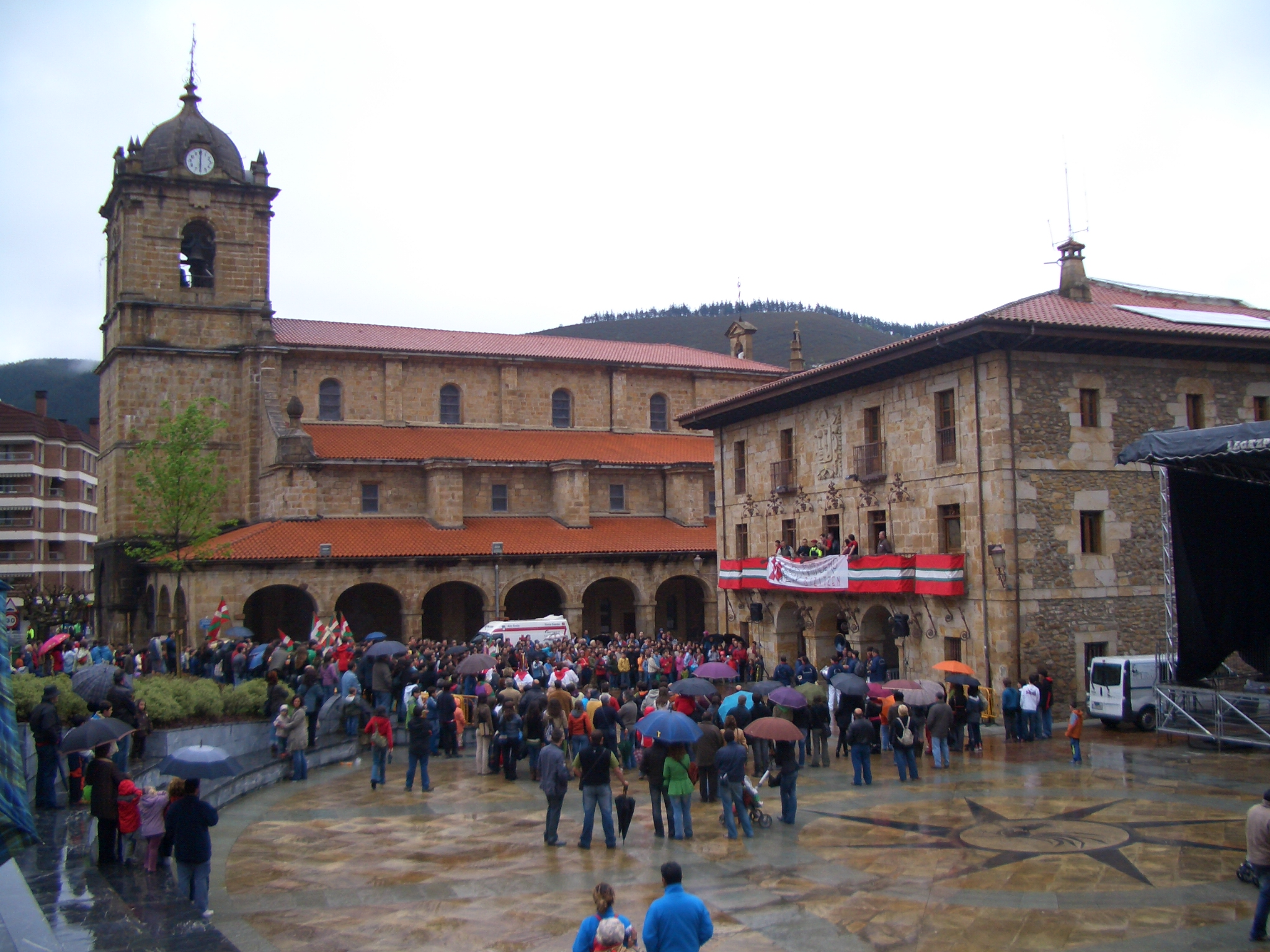
- Legazpi plaza

- Coat of arms

- Location of Legazpi within the Basque Country
- Coordinates: 43°3′18″N 2°20′6″W
- Country: Spain
- Autonomous Community: Basque Country
- Province: Gipuzkoa
- Comarca: Tolosaldea

Government
  - Mayor: Kepa Urcelay Goitia

Area
  - Total: 42 km^{2} (16 sq mi)
- Elevation: 400 m (1,300 ft)

Population (2025-01-01)
  - Total: 8,384
  - Density: 200/km^{2} (520/sq mi)
- Time zone: UTC+1 (CET)
  - Summer (DST): UTC+2 (CEST)
- Postal code: 20230
- Website: www.legazpi.net

Legazpi (Basque: [leɣas̻pi], Spanish: [leˈɣaθpi]) is a city in the Gipuzkoa province of the Autonomous Community of the Basque Country, northern Spain.

Legazpi is a town of about 9,000 inhabitants located on top of the Urola valley, in Gipuzkoa. Surrounded by mountains, and at the foot of the Aizkorri mountain range, its predominant economic activity is industrial (manufacturing, metal processing, plastics).

The rich industrial tradition of Legazpi goes back to the High Middle Ages, when transformation of iron ore was achieved by means of the haizeolak ("ironworks moved by wind"). During the 14th century, wind energy came to be replaced by water in the metal processing with the foundation of several "ironworks propelled by water" (ur 'water' and ola originally 'shack', are the two lexical components of "Urola", a river crossing Legazpi). This industrial tradition had its continuity in modern times, and Legazpi became one of the most important metallurgic centres in the industrialised modern Basque Country.

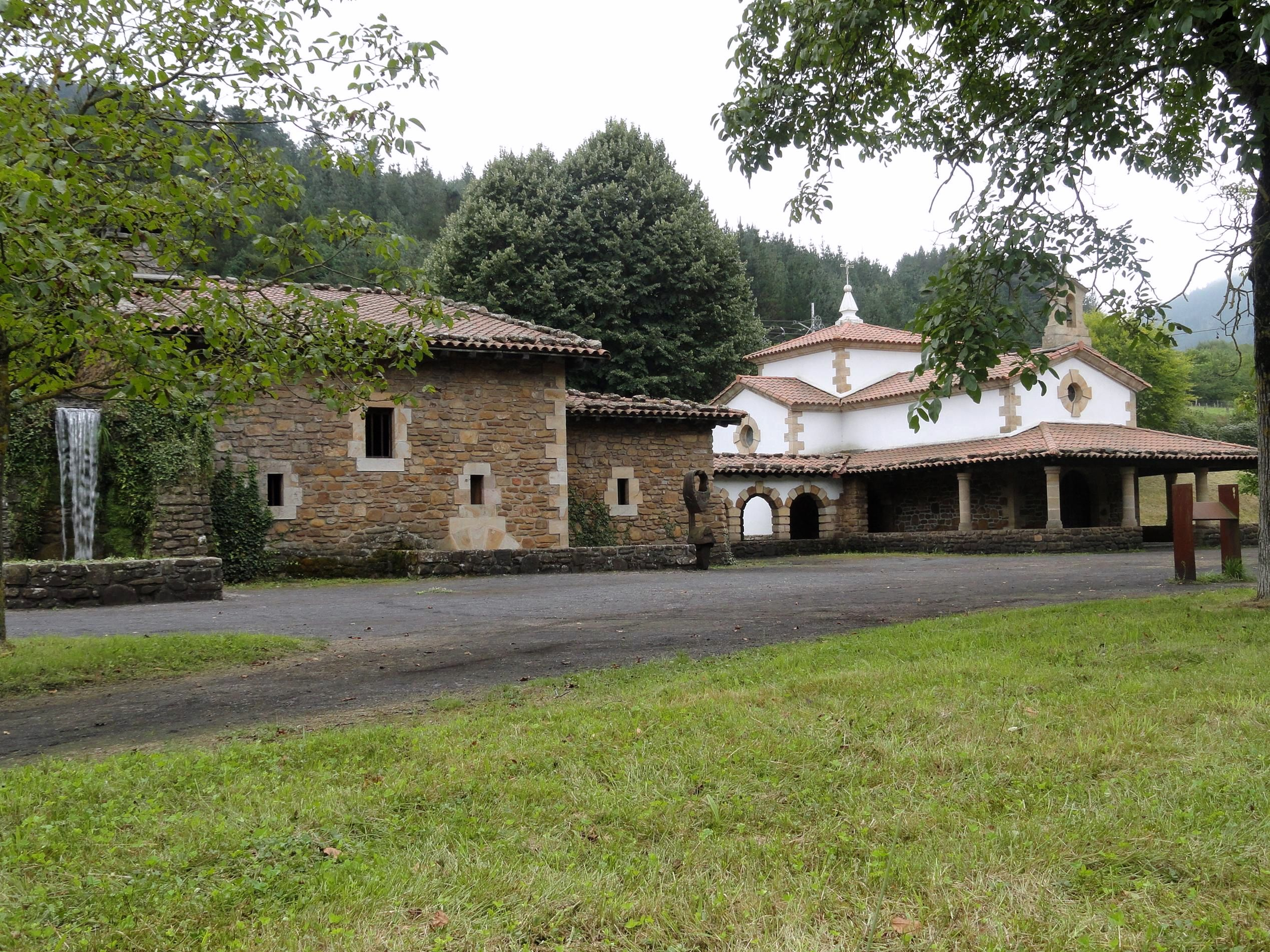
Mirandaola foundry

One of the 14th century ironworks (called Mirandaola) has remained in place to date like nowhere else in the Basque Country. It is the heart of a thematic park with an educational and touristy vocation, where traditions and ways of living from the past are shown.

== Notable people ==
- Irene Paredes (born 1991), footballer for Barcelona and captain of the Spain national team
- Pilar Zabala Aguirre (born 1951), researcher, writer and professor
- Xabi Zurutuza (born 2006), motorcycle racer
