= Urola (river) =

River in Spain

Coordinates: 42°59′25″N 2°19′48″W

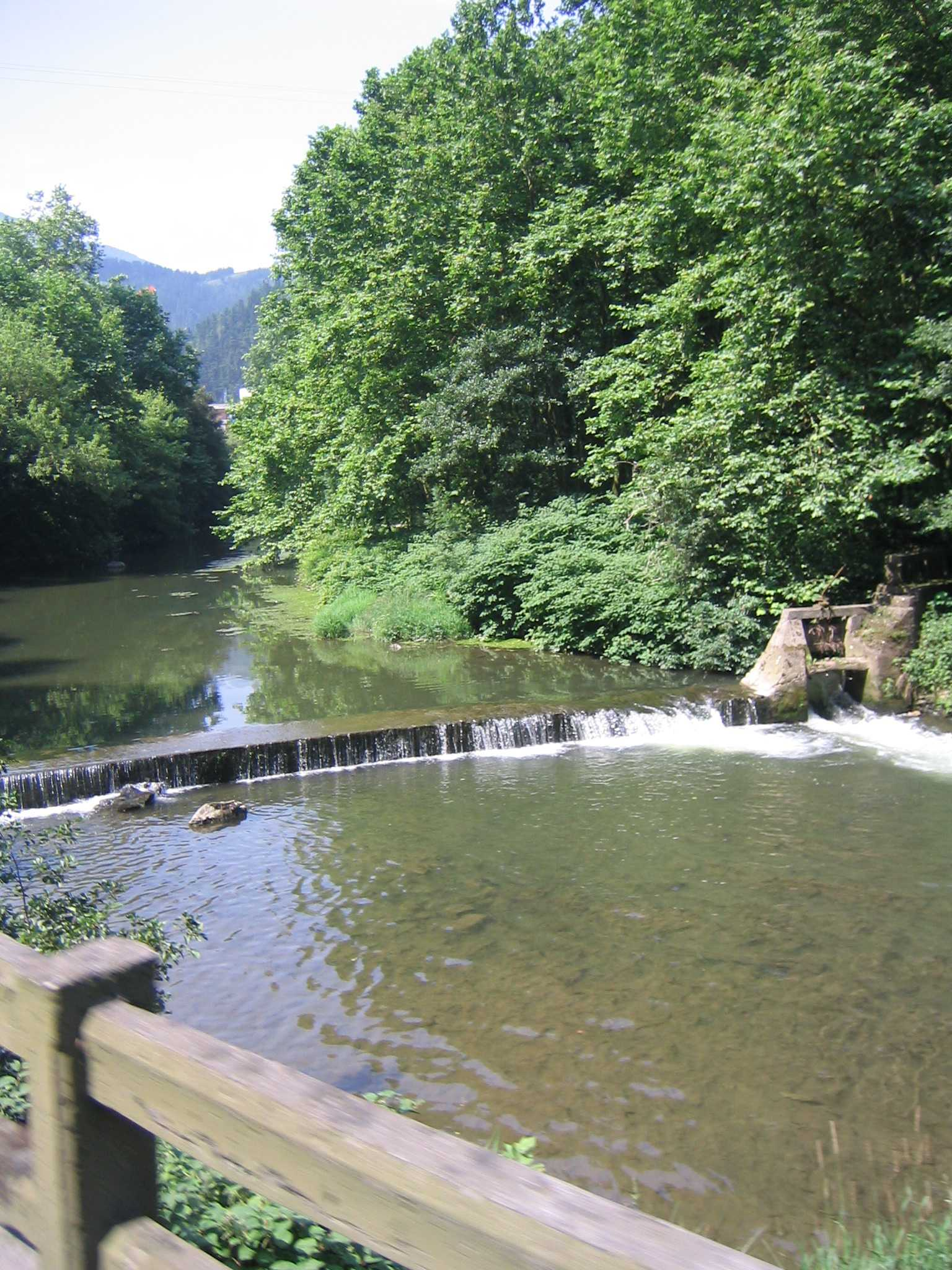
Urola River

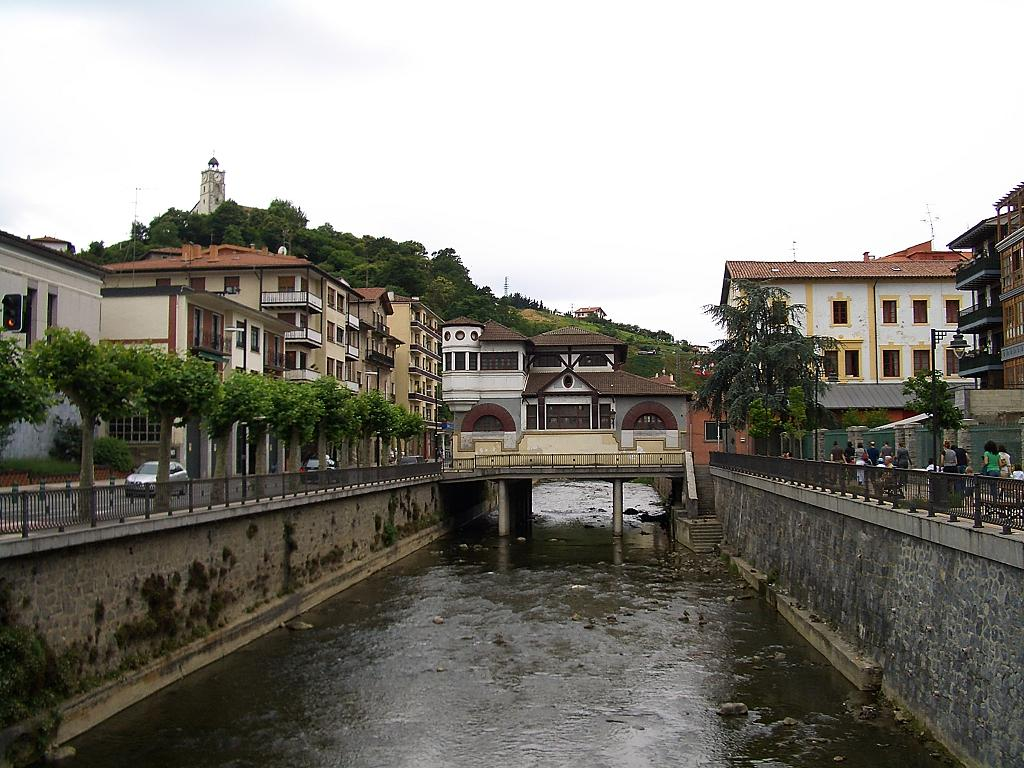
Urola River in Azkoitia

The Urola is a river and valley in Gipuzkoa, Basque Autonomous Community, Spain.

The river is only 55 kilometres in length, and runs from headwaters in the Aizkorri Mountains, near the town of Legazpi to its outflow into the Cantabrian Sea at the town of Zumaia on the Bay of Biscay . It forms the border between the municipalities of Zumárraga and Urretxu, and further downriver, it passes through the towns of Azkoitia and Azpeitia.

The word urola comes from two basque words Ur and Ola, meaning "water" and "factory" respectively referring to the water mills which have stood in the valley since the Middle Ages.

== See also ==
- List of rivers of Spain
