= Gonzalo Aguirre Beltrán =

Mexican anthropologist

Gonzalo Aguirre Beltrán (Note: In this Mexican name, the surname is Aguirre and the second or maternal family name is Beltrán.) (20 January 1908 –13 January 1996) was a Mexican anthropologist known for his studies of marginal populations. His work has focused on Afro-Mexican and Indigenous populations. He was the director of the National Indigenous Institute from 1971 to 1972 and, as Assistant Secretary for Popular Culture and Continuing Education, he was responsible for forming government policy towards Indigenous populations. For this reason he is important in the field of applied anthropology.

== Life and career ==
Aguirre Beltrán was born in Tlacotalpan, Veracruz, the son of a medical doctor, and he continued himself in medical studies, attending the National Autonomous University (UNAM) and earning a B.S. in 1927 and his M.D. in 1931. He returned to his home state, and practiced medicine in the town of Huatusco, Veracruz, for ten years.

In his early years as a medical doctor, he became interested in local history and published a book on agrarian struggle during the colonial era. In 1942 he met Columbia University-trained anthropologist Manuel Gamio, who suggested that Aguirre Beltrán study people of African descent in Mexico, resulting in his landmark study, La población negra de México, 1519–1810: Estudio etnohistórico (1946). He left the practice of medicine in favor of becoming an anthropologist, although he pursued topics on medical anthropology.

He served in various government positions, including as head of the Sanitary Unit of Huatusco. He was appointed head of the Department of Demography in the Department of the Interior in the Manuel Ávila Camacho and Miguel Alemán administrations. He was director of Indigenous Affairs at the Secretariat of Public Education (1946–49), a researcher for the National Indigenous Institute (INI) (1949–50), coordinator of INI's Tzeltal-Tzotzil region (1951–52), and subdirector of INI (1952–56). In 1961, he was elected to the Chamber of Deputies for Veracruz's 12th district, representing the Institutional Revolutionary Party (PRI).

He returned to Veracruz and became rector of the Universidad Veracruzana. Under the administration of Luis Echeverría (1970–76) he was sub-secretary of the Department of Culture and Continuing Education, creating a publication series disseminating research on indigenous communities.

Gonzalo Aguirre Beltrán died in Xalapa, Veracruz, on 13 January 1996.

== Works ==
- El señorío de Cuauhtocho: Luchas agrarias en México durante el virreinato 1940.
- La población negra de México, 1519-1810: Estudio etnohistórico. Mexico City 1946.
- Formas de gobierno indígena. Mexico City 1953.
- Problemas de salud en la situación intecultural 1953
- Problemas de la población indígena de la cuenca del Tepalcatepec 1953.
- Cuijila: Esbozo etnográfico de un pueblo 1957.
- Medicina y mágica: El proceso de aculturación Mexico City 1963.
- Regiones de refugio: El desarrollo de la comunidad y el proceso dominical en mestizoamérica. Mexico City 1967. (translated as Regions of Refuge), Society of Applied Anthropology 1979.
- Teoría y práctica de la educación indígena 1973
- Obra polémica 1976.
- Lenguas vernáculas: Su uso y deuso en la enseñanza, la experiencia de México 1983.
- Zongólica: Encuentro de dioses y santos patronos 1986.
- Crítica antropólica: Contribuciones al estudio del pensamiento de México 1990.
- Obra antropológica (16 vols) Mexico City 1989-1995. Mexico City, Fundo de Cultura Económica.

== Honors ==
- Malinowski Award of the Society for Applied Anthropology 1973
- Manuel Gamio Award 1978
- National Social Science Prize 1979
- Belisario Domínguez Medal 1991

== See also ==
- 1973 Bronislaw Malinowski Award

== Notes ==
Preceded by Andrés Serra Rojas	Belisario Domínguez Medal of Honor; 1991	Succeeded by Ramón G. Bonfil
