= Urretxu =

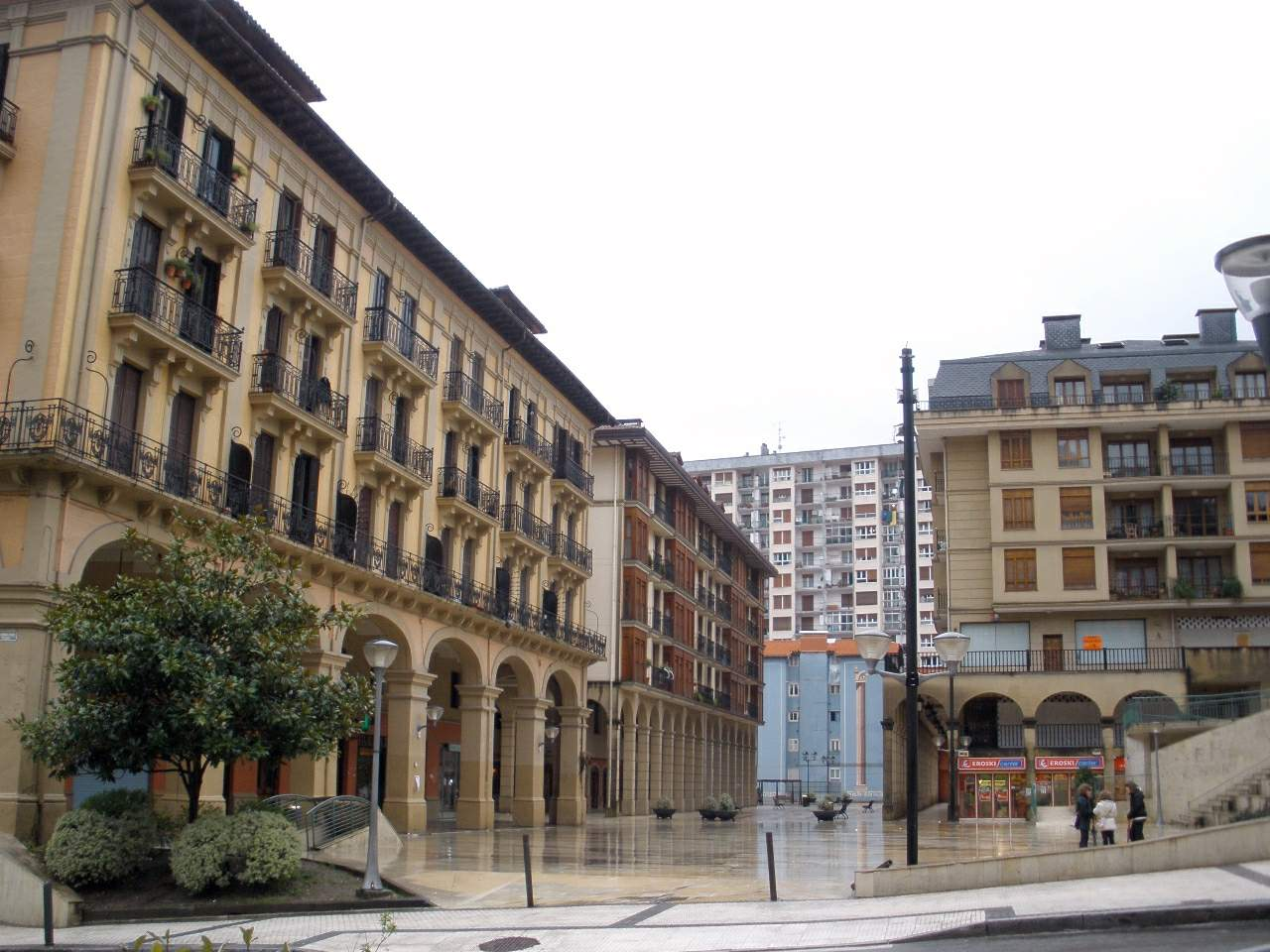

- Coat of arms

- Location of Urretxu within the Basque Country
- Coordinates: 43°05′30″N 2°18′50″W
- Country: Spain
- Autonomous community: Basque Country
- Province: Gipuzkoa
- Eskualdea: Urola Garaia

Area
  - Total: 16.88 km^{2} (6.52 sq mi)
- Elevation: 355 m (1,165 ft)

Population (2025-01-01)
  - Total: 6,730
  - Density: 399/km^{2} (1,030/sq mi)
- Time zone: UTC+1 (CET)
  - Summer (DST): UTC+2 (CEST)
- Postal code: 20700
- Website: https://www.urretxu.eus/

Urretxu (Spanish, Villareal de Urrechu) is a town located in the province of Gipuzkoa, in the Autonomous Community of the Basque Country, northern Spain.

Situated on the Urola river, it is contiguous with the larger town of Zumarraga immediately to the south, with the river making the boundary between them.
