= Zumaia =

- Municipality
- Zumaia
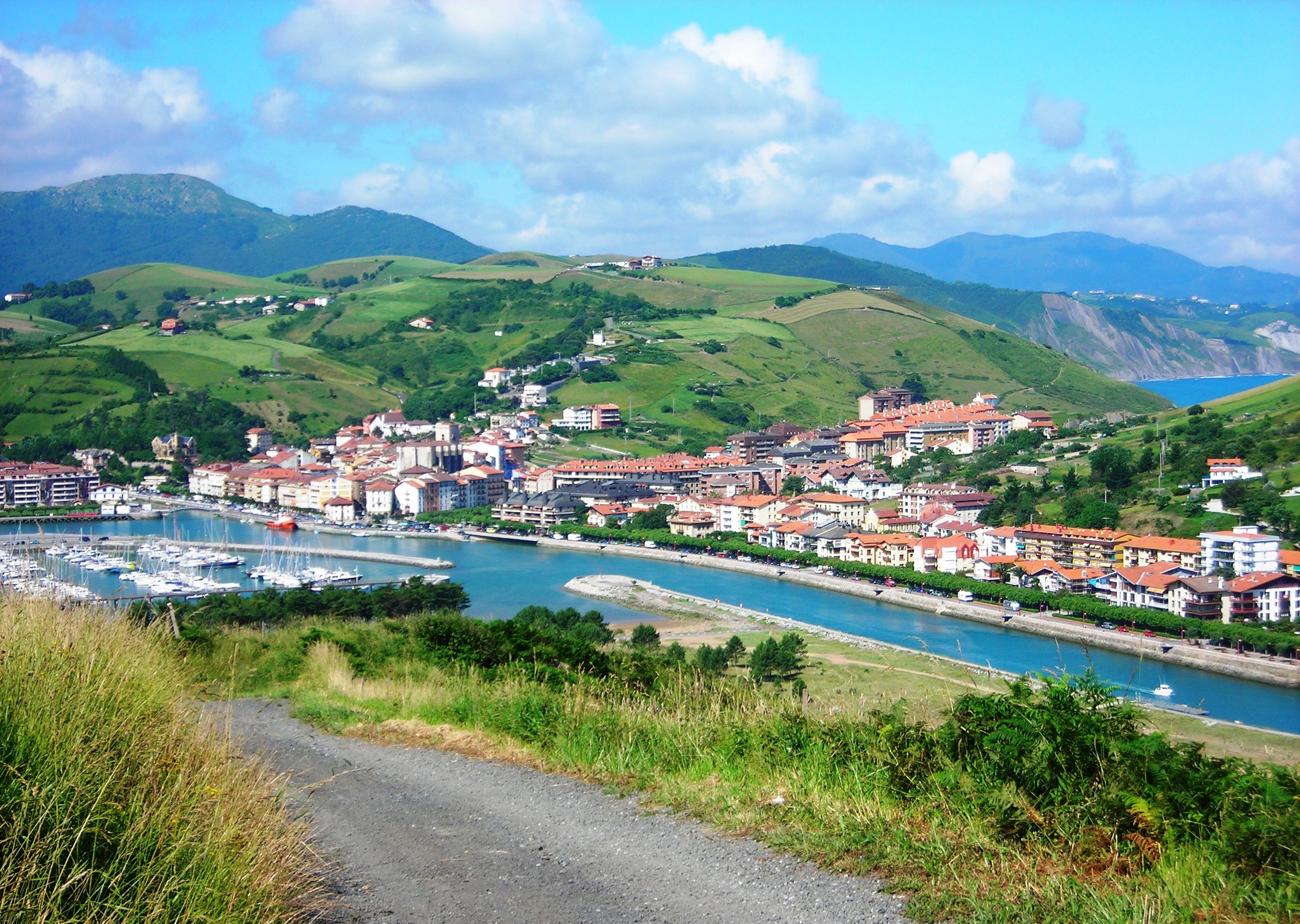

- Flag Coat of arms

- Location Zumaia (Spain)
- Coordinates: 43°17′50″N 2°15′25″W
- Country: Spain
- Autonomous community: Basque Country
- Province: Gipuzkoa
- Comarca: Urola Costa
- Founded: 1347

Government
  - Mayor: Iñaki Ostolaza Esnal (EH Bildu)

Area
  - Total: 11.28 km^{2} (4.36 sq mi)

Population (2025-01-01)
  - Total: 10,160
- Demonym: Basque: zumaiarra
- Time zone: UTC+1 (CET)
  - Summer (DST): UTC+2 (CEST)
- Postal code: 20750
- Area code: +34 (Spain) + 943 (Gipuzkoa)
- Website: zumaia.eus

Zumaia ([s̻umaja], Spanish: Zumaya) is a small town in the north of Spain in the Basque Country.

The town has two beaches (Itzurun and Santiago), which are of interest to geologists because they are situated among the longest set of continuous rock strata in the world. These formations are termed flysch and they date from the mid-cretaceous period to the present, a time period of over 100 million years. The K–T boundary is present at the Itzurun beach, and fossils can be found, notably of ammonites. The strata stretches along a distance of about 8 km, between the beaches of Deba and Getaria, with Zumaia lying in the middle.

The town is also the home-turned-museum of the painter Ignacio Zuloaga. Exhibits include works by El Greco, Rivera, Zurbarán and Goya. Across the street there is a museum of craft and hand-crafted products of Laia. Within the city centre, the Basque-style Gothic church of San Pedro can be found. It has a temple with a magnificent reredos by Juan de Antxieta, the only work by this Basque sculptor found in Gipuzkoa.

Zumaia is located at the point where the Urola and Narrondo rivers come together. The origins of the town can be traced by its ancient monastery. In the Middle Ages, the people who lived in the Sehatz valley having to endure the continuous attacks of pirates and pillagers, fortified the city. The church today retains the relic of its defensive appearance.

== Etymology ==
It has been widely theorized that Zumaia's name comes from "zuma" or "zume", the Basque word for the wicker, a plant that apparently was plentiful on the area. With regard to Villagrana, there is a theory that states the possibility to be related with "grana", meaning "seeding", that were produced by the abundant groves of evergreen oaks in that period.

== History ==
=== Founding ===
Despite the disagreements in certain aspects with regard to the origins of Zumaia, all historians agree that the villa emerged surrounding the Monastery of Santa Maria. According to the first preserved parchment in which is mentioned the place "Zumaya", the Monastery of Santa Maria had been a donation by a privilege of Sancho VI of Navarre to the Roncesvalles's convent in 1292.

Despite the different conclusions about the emplacement of the monastery, the monks of the Monastery of Santa Maria the direct witnesses of the birth of this villa, after the inhabitants dispersed by the valley of Sehatz decided to put an end to the continuous assaults of piracy and plunder and raise a villa walled and strengthened from where they could defend in group against the enemy. Due to its extent, its strategic location and its direct contact with the sea, the chosen place was Zumaia. Nevertheless, the villa was not constituted juridically until 1347, when Alfonso XI of Castile provided the municipal charter to its citizens of "Villagrana de Zumaya's Villa", to which was granted the Jurisdiction of San Sebastián.

In the 16th century, Zumaia relied on 136 houses, 70 of them distributed among six streets that existed inside the wall, and the remaining ones dispersed by three neighborhoods that were staying out of the wall. In total there were 108 neighborhood surnames, 53 of them with the qualification of nobility. Nowadays there is no evidence of the fortification that only was interrupted at a height of solar houses and towers that could play the same function of defending as the wall. The entrance halls included the Principal Entrance Hall of the villa and the great cross that presided over them. They were destroyed in the middle of the 18th century to clear the surroundings of the town. The only natural door was that of the bar of the sea, which was apparently the most dangerous for being the most accessible.

Since the 16th century the bells of the parish have been melted many times. In 1578 the mayor ordered to ring them three times consecutively so that citizens were well-informed and came more assiduously to the meetings of the regiment, which was retired long time ago. Moreover, on the eve of the General Meetings—that were celebrated in the villa every 18 years, to offer fuel-wood and coal to the secretary of the province—two oaks were cut. In one of these sessions, on 27 December 1620, the same day in which Ignatius of Loyola, Patron Saint of Gipuzkoa was chosen, the patron saint of the town was named as the Immaculate Conception of the Virgin Mary.

=== Economic changes and development ===
With the pass of centuries, has brought logically many changes not only in the former ordinances municipal written in 1584, but also in the urban development as well as in the customs and way of living of citizens. However, the best keys to notice the development of the villa from its foundation to the present day, is the economic predominant activity of every epoch. The majority of the first inhabitants of the villa were devoted to agriculture, though grouping in the same place accelerated the appearance of some professional and industrial activities. By the end of the 14th century, ships were constructed in the river. A high percentage of the population was devoted to fishing and navigation. The river was then very rich and many species could be fished, among them salmon, trout, shellfish and eels. Many were reconciling the coastal fishing with agriculture. By then, the manufacturing of cement had also become a relevant activity, for which they were taking advantage of the matters of tertiary areas of the surroundings. From the port they were departing goods towards the Netherlands as well as manufactured products were imported. Some historians even claim that the passenger liner that was joining the villa with the hermitage of Santiago – habitual accommodation of the pilgrims who were going towards Santiago de Compostela, were also among the most prominent sources of Zumaia's revenue in the 16th century.

The following centuries, 17th century and the 18th century, were not brilliant periods at all. The land continued being the principal economic activity of the neighbors, in spite of the fact that Zumaia continued having many deficits in agriculture, especially in the production of wheat, corn and beans; until that in 1766 all the houses were recognized to verify if any neighbor possessed more grain than the necessary for their maintenance. There were also citizens dedicated to both maritime and terrestrial transport of goods, mainly iron, and the fishing activity was maintained and even increased, since in 1610 was created the Cofradía de Mareantes de San Telmo, meaning the Confraternity of the Seagoing of San Telmo.

It was in this period when there was emphasized the emigration begun at the end of the 16th century (in 1616 Zumaia embraced 935 inhabitants) and it did not stop until two centuries later with the economic reappearance.

The situation began to improve very quickly in the 17th century, among other reasons because the desiccation of the marshes enabled the cultivation of the former reed-beds and, consequently, the increase of the agricultural production, especially of corn. But there were some other factors that lead this reappearance, since in the 19th century the factories of cement turned into the engine of the economy of the villa, promoting the commercial activity of the port. The terrestrial transport also improved in this period of time, since between the year 1882 and 1885 a road that joined Zumaia with Getaria was created, which was already communicated with San Sebastián, in 1900 appeared a train that would join Zumaia with Zarautz, and in 1926 the railroad of the Urola was inaugurated, which nowadays is already removed. The improvement of the communications, nevertheless, harmed to the port of Bedua, whose commercial activity started to expire due to the fact that the bridge of Urola river was blocking the way to the ships upstream.

The industry of the cement began to decline at the beginning of the 20th century, at the same time as the naval industry started to arise again strongly, and soon later also the industry of the engine. An interesting fact that took place in Zumaia is that the first diesel engine of the whole Spanish State was set here, precisely in the enterprise Yeregui Hermanos. This industrial rise brought about logically a considerable increase of the population, mainly due to the immigration.

The percentages of the different activities that were stimulating the economy of Zumaia had considerably changed by the beginning of the 20th century. In 1950, the 56.1% of the population worked in the industrial sector, while only the 17% dedicated to agriculture. Some years later, the economic crisis also came to Zumaia, sharpened by moments with readjustment of personnel and even with the closing of some big workshops that had been emblematic until then. Today, fifty years later, several more modest companies have been created, which are also more chords with the new economic trends of the market.

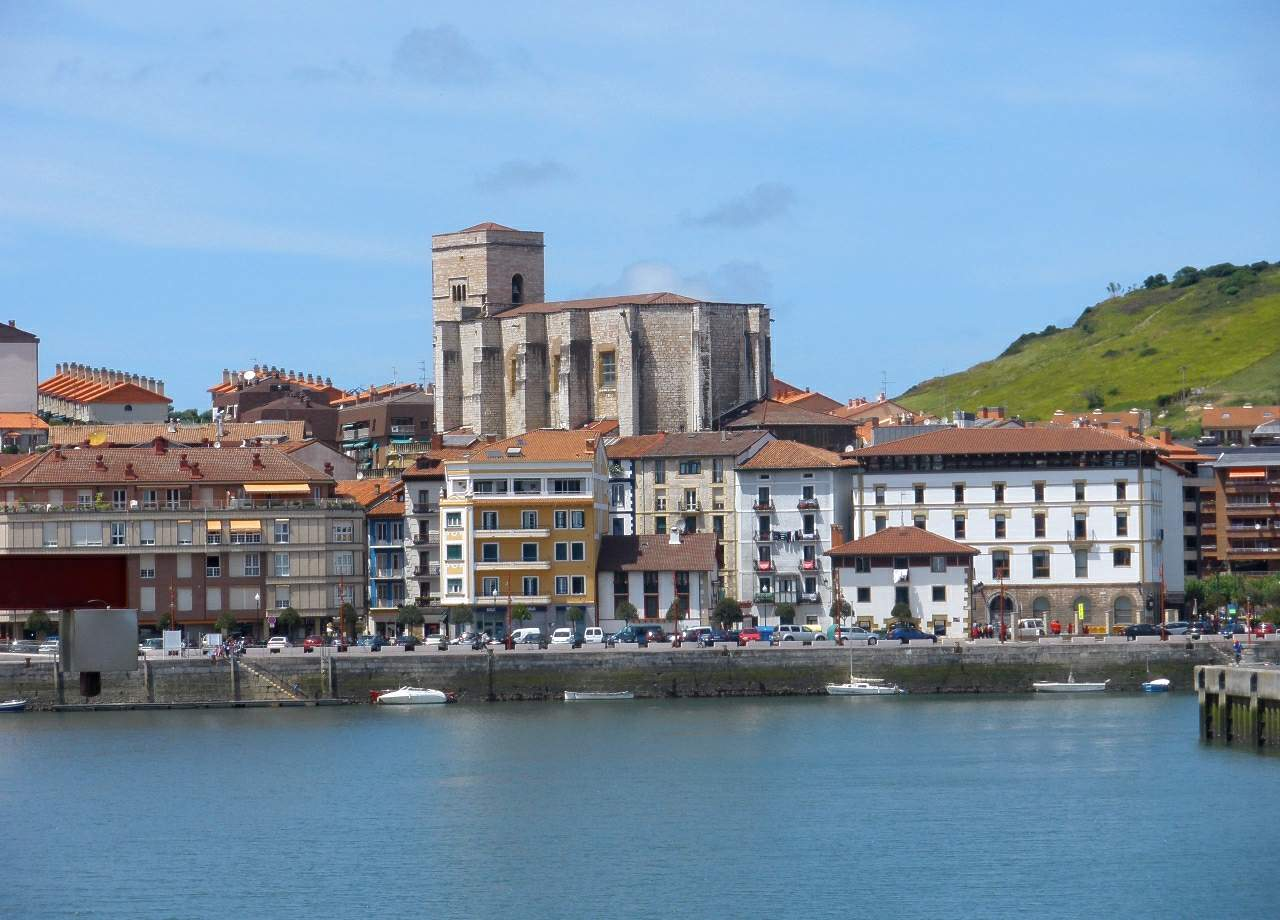
View from Zumaia.

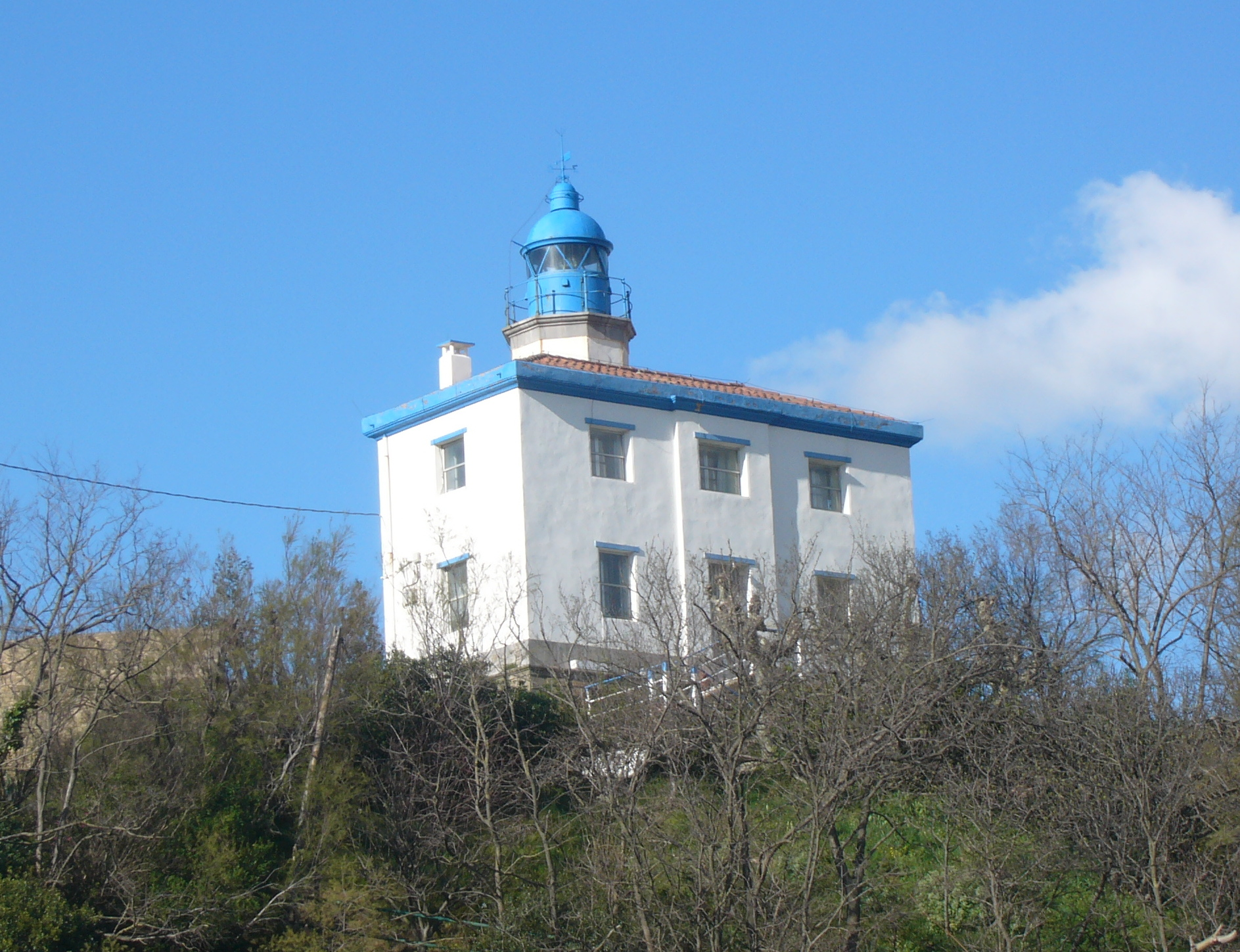
Lighthouse of Zumaia.

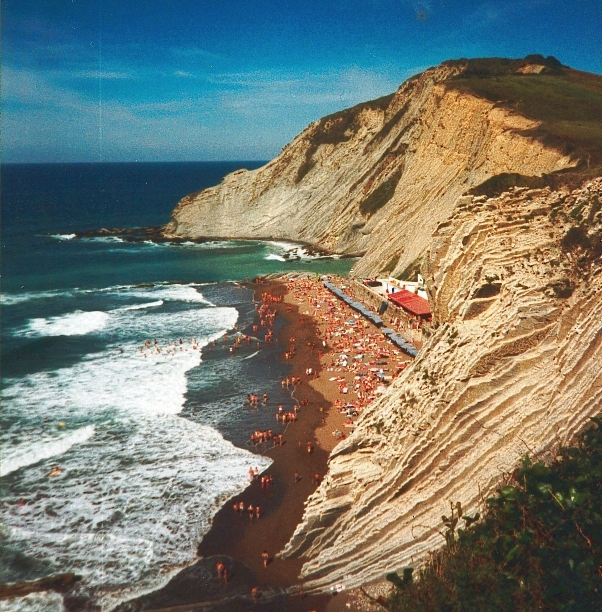
Itzurun Beach.

== Cuisine ==
=== Octopus ===
The octopus and Zumaia have been together since the early days of the creation of the town. There has been a special relation between this animal and the town in which other towns, in Getaria, Zarautz or Deba (which they are 5, 10 and 16 km from Zumaia), has never occurred. The tradition of catching octopuses on the coastline of Zumaia has been very typical, and the octopus has become the essence of the culture and tradition of the town.

==== Fishing ====
There are three main places in Zumaia where people catch octopuses: The rocks of Itzurun beach, Inpernupe, and the coastline between Zumaia and Deba. The ideal moment is when the tide is not high. There have to be visible rocks to catch them, since the octopuses are hidden in the holes which the rocks usually have. So, the more rocks are visible, the more chances are to catch them. The hunt requires a fish hook to grab the octopus. But, there are different techniques, and they change according to the place:

- Looking the remains of crabs and other small sea animals in the entrance of the holes (so, there is a signal that the octopus is inside that hole) and catching them with a hook.
- Using a stick covered with bait to attract octopuses and, when they are visible, which they do not leave the hole if there is no bait, grab them with the hook.

Fishing octopuses has been a tradition in Zumaia. But, not all the people can catch them easily. There are some families where the tradition is strong. Some individuals had caught 100 in a day. But, they were other times, when there were many more octopuses than nowadays. The pollution, the fishing vessels and the non-limit octopus fishing years have been very prejudicial to the coastline. Because of this, the government has regulated the amount that one individual can catch (one octopus and heavier than 750 g).

Every year when there are big tides a lot of people usually go the coastline to fish for octopus, and as some of them are experienced, they fish more than 20 octopuses on a day. Nowadays, it is illegal to fish more than one per day, but some people (specially the old people who have been fishing all their lives) still fish a lot of them. The octopus cannot be eaten after it is fished. It has to be treated, but there are different ways to treat it. And, the way it is cooked depends on who it is treated after fishing it.

Fresh octopus meat is gristly, so it has to be frozen for at least a week to tenderize.

If the octopus is fresh, and it is tenderized after a lot of hits, it is cooked with tomatoes, a la gallega or with peppers and onion. But, those cooking recipes are very common in other places like Asturias or Galicia, where there are traditions of fishing and cooking octopuses. It was and still is common to cook in those ways. But, there is a recipe, which it needs dry octopus, that it is exclusively from Zumaia. In other towns near Zumaia there is not this tradition.

==== Drying ====
Drying octopuses is a typical tradition in Zumaia despite it being an uncommon practice on coastal populations. It consists of cleaning the octopus once dead, leaving it to dry in a bucket for 3 to 5 days and putting it in a stick for 7 to 8 days. Up to 80% of the original weight might be lost, and the result emits a strong odor.

== IUGS geological heritage site ==
In respect of the site being 'one of the best exposed, most continuous and highly studied outcrops of deep marine sediments in the world' the 'Cretaceous-Paleogene Stratigraphic Section of Zumaia' was included by the International Union of Geological Sciences (IUGS) in its assemblage of 100 'geological heritage sites' around the world in a listing published in October 2022. The organisation defines an 'IUGS Geological Heritage Site' as 'a key place with geological elements and/or processes of international scientific relevance, used as a reference, and/or with a substantial contribution to the development of geological sciences through history.'

== Image gallery ==
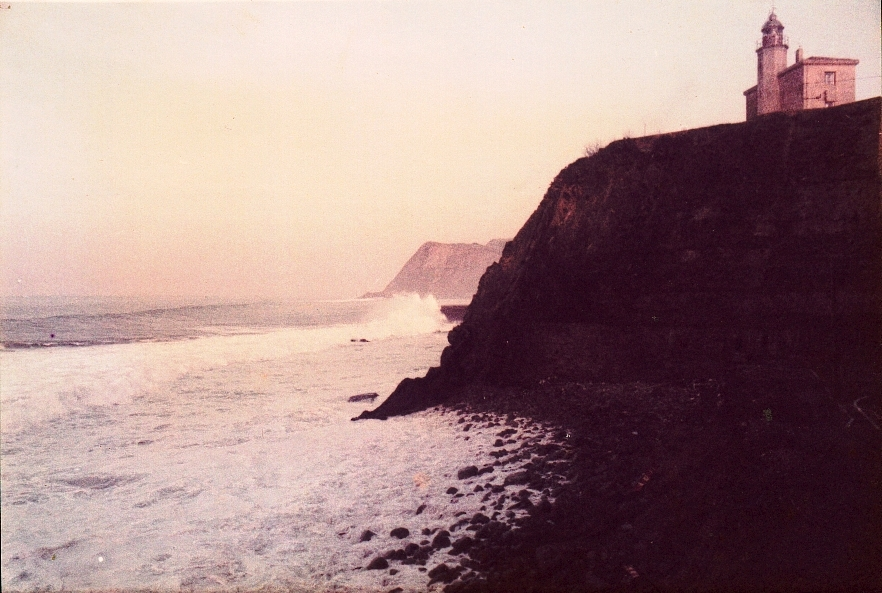
Lighthouse of Zumaia

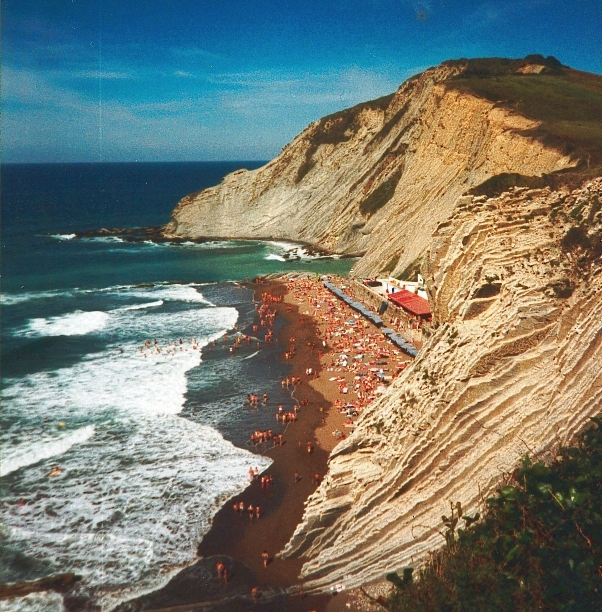
Itzurun beach

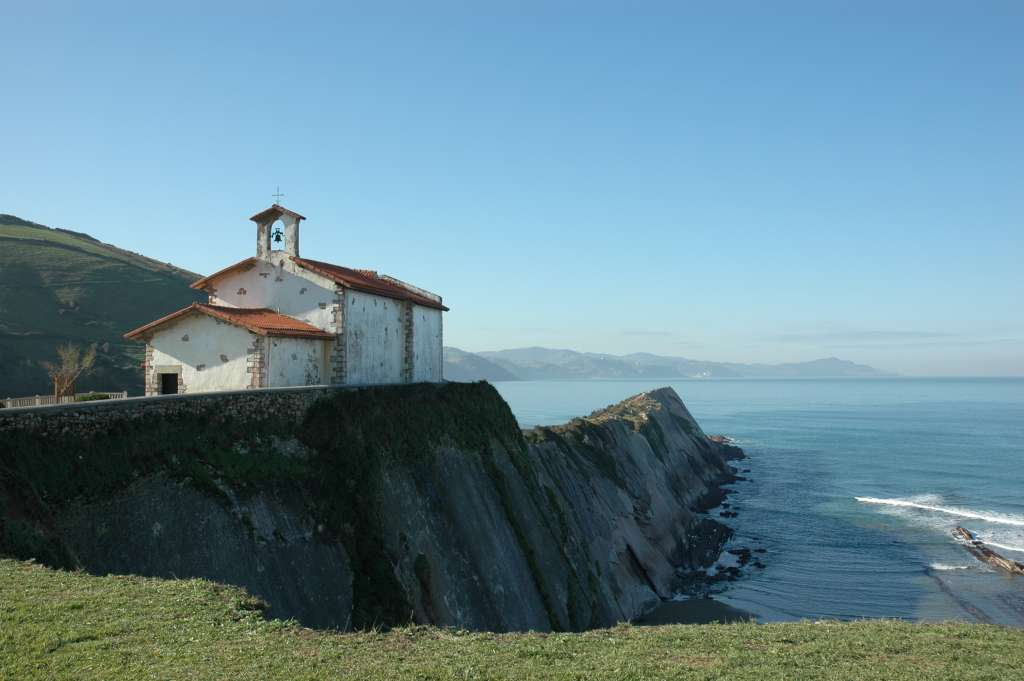
Chapel of San Telmo

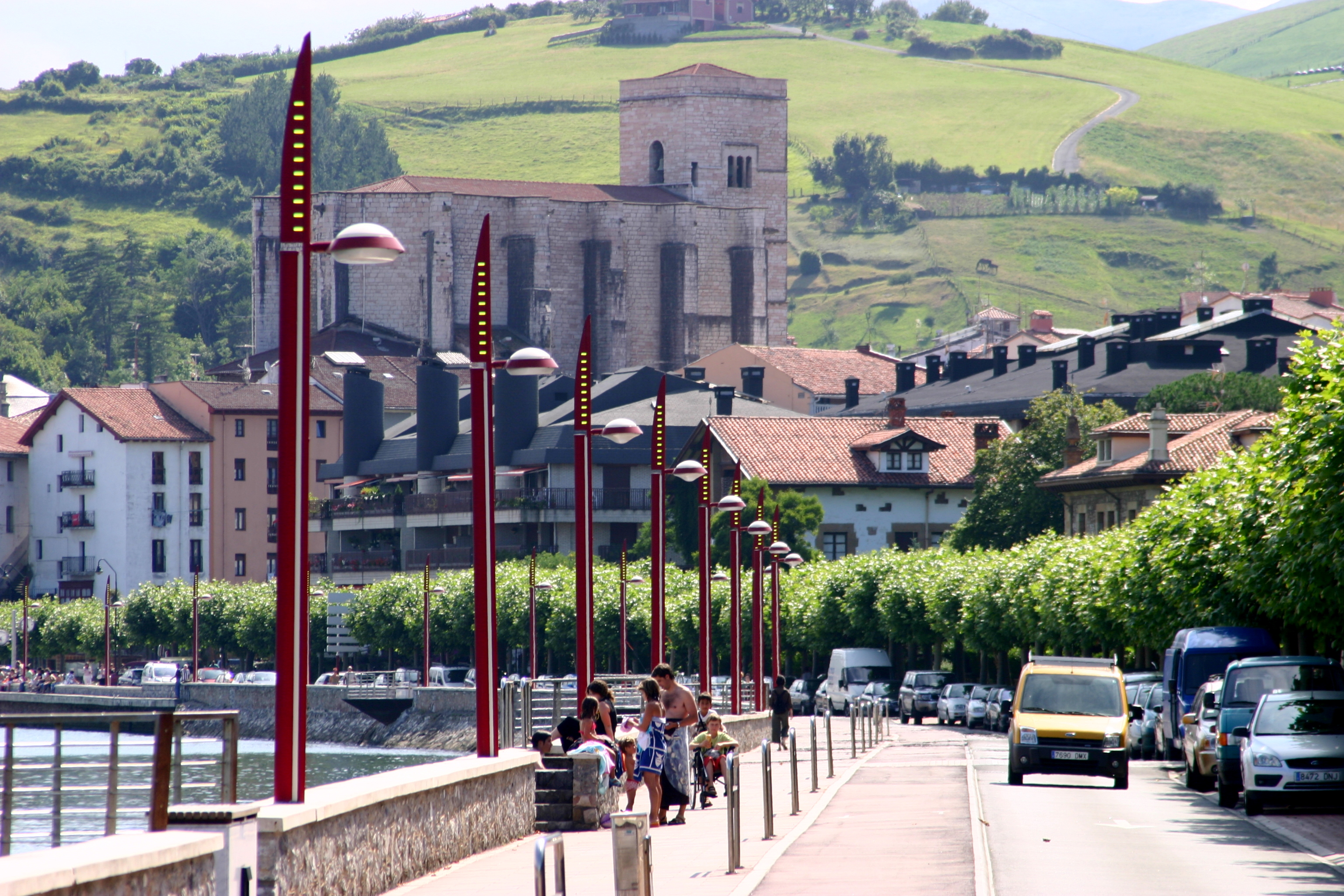
Zumaia seen from the beach

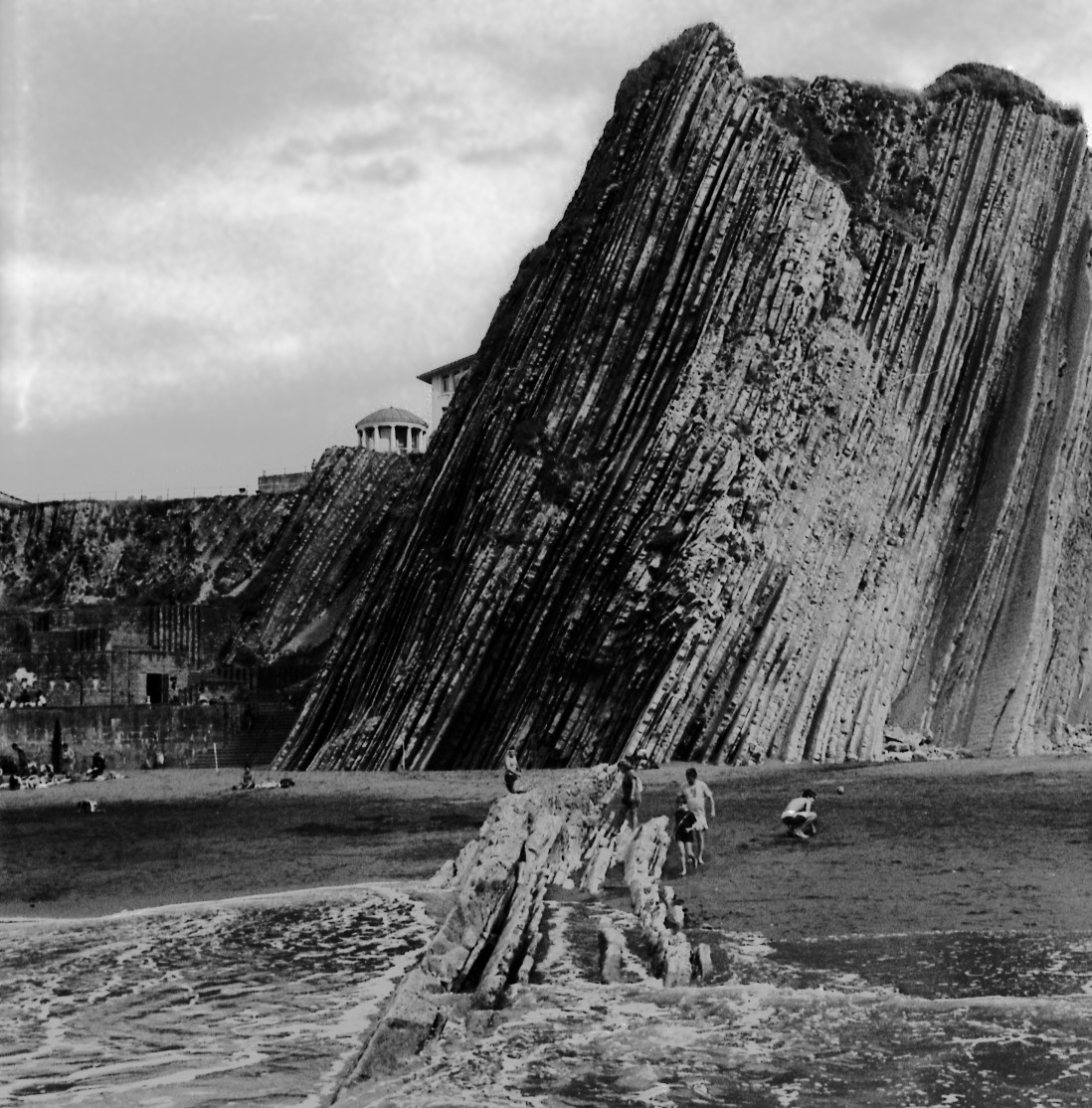
Itzurun Beach in 2013

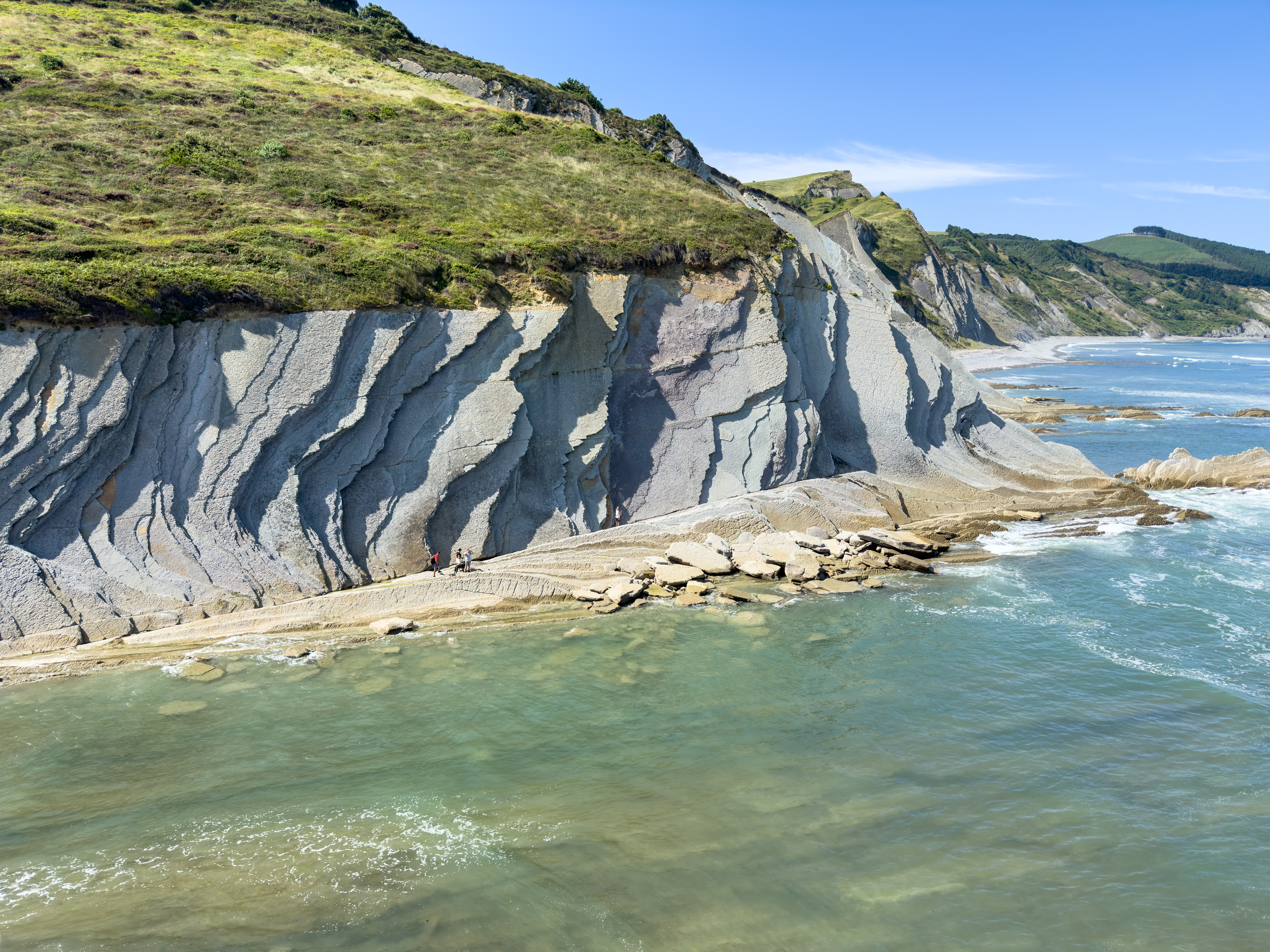
Deba and Zumaia: Basque Coast Geopark-Flysch

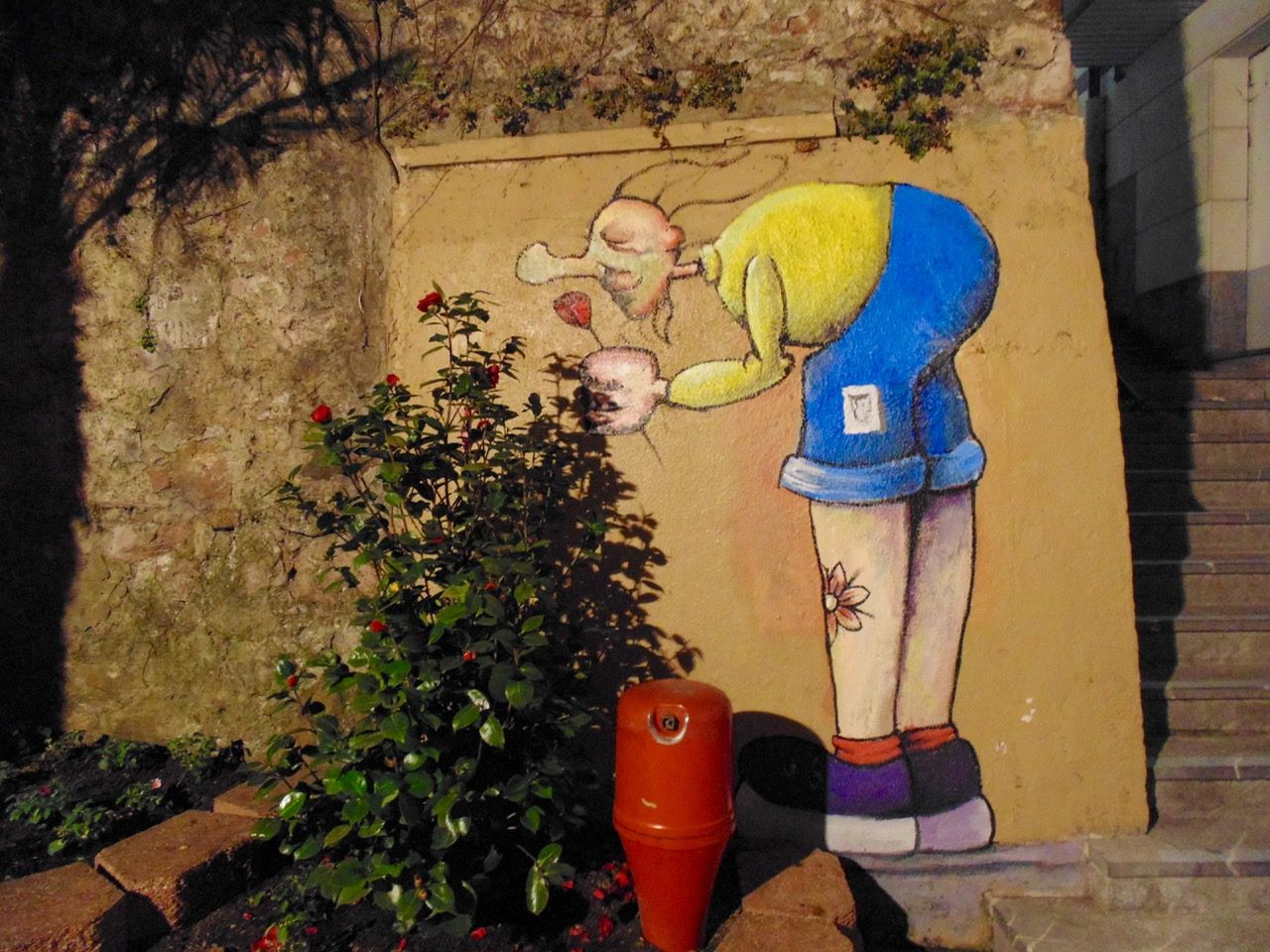
Integration of graffiti into its environment at Erribera street (2016)
