= Marcelo Aguirre =

Marcelo Aguirre may refer to:

- Marcelo Aguirre (footballer) (born 1983), Argentine football midfielder
- Marcelo Aguirre (table tennis) (born 1993), Paraguay table tennis player
