= Francisco de Aguirre (painter) =

Spanish painter

Francisco de Aguirre (active 1646) was a Spanish painter, active in Toledo during the Baroque period. He was a pupil of Eugenio Caxes, and known chiefly as a portrait painter and a restorer of pictures in the cathedral.
