= Celso Aguirre Bernal =

Mexican writer and historian

Celso Aguirre Bernal was a Mexican writer and historian. He was born in Puerto de Canoas, Sinaloa in 1916 and died in 1997 in Mexicali, where he had lived since the 1950s.

== Selected works ==
- Compendio histórico-biográfico de Mexicali (1968)
- Suplemento histórico-biográfico de Mexicali (1970)
- Tijuana. Su historia-sus hombres (1975)
- 30 años de gobierno municipal 1953-1983 (1982)
- Joaquín Murrieta, raíz y razón del movimiento chicano (1985)
- Breve historia del estado de Baja California (1987)
