= Amber Aguirre =

American ceramic sculptor

Amber Aguirre (born 1958) is an American ceramic sculptor. She was born to Holocaust survivors. Aguirre received a BFA in ceramics from the University of Southern California in 1981, an MA in art education from San Jose State University in 1990, and a master of library and information science degree from San José State University in 1996. She currently lives and works in Kailua-Kona, Hawaii.

Disabled by Amber Aguirre, 2016, Honolulu Museum of Art

She is best known for creating human and anthropomorphic figures with a surface created by a technique of her own invention, which she calls "naked fauxku". By employing a high fire, oxygenated atmosphere without reduction, a surface similar to naked raku is produced. Disabled, in the collection of the Honolulu Museum of Art, portrays a seated nude female figure with an anvil in place of her left foot. It was created shortly after the artist underwent surgery on her ankle. This porcelain sculpture demonstrates the surface typical of Aguirre's work as well as her sculpture's whimsy. The Benyamini Contemporary Ceramics Center (Tel Aviv, Israel), the Hawaii State Art Museum, the Honolulu Museum of Art, the International Ceramics Studio (Kecscemet, Hungary), and the Kellogg Art Gallery (Cal Poly University, Pomona, California) are among the public collections holding works by Amber Aguirre.
