= Vera Tiesler =

German-born Mexican bioarchaeologist

Vera Tiesler is a bioarchaeologist, and a full research professor in the department of Anthroprological Sciences at the Autonomous University of Yucatán in Mexico. She is a specialist in Maya civilization remains.

== Career ==
Tiesler was born in Germany. In 1985, she completed an honours undergraduate degree in one year, at the age of 19, from the Tulane University in New Orleans, Louisiana. Following her degree, Tiesler spent two weeks in Mexico City before returning to Germany to start medical school. While in Mexico, Tiesler fell in love with a young doctor, who died in 1987. This prompted Tiesler to leave Germany, enroll in the National Polytechnic Institute in Mexico City to complete her medical degree, and later obtain a PhD in anthropology, under the supervision of Manuel Gándara, from the Autonomous University of Mexico (UNAM) in 1999. She then became a professor at UNAM in 2000, where she studies ancient skeletons.

Tiesler has been a part of multiple archaeology expeditions, including the 1999-2006 examination of K’inich Janaab’ Pakal of Palenque and his companion, the Red Queen (Tomb of The Red Queen), and the excavation of Ukit Kan Le’k Tok of Ek' Balam. From studying 27 skeletons in a graveyard in La Isabela (the first permanent European town founded by Christopher Columbus on his second voyage), Tiesler found that scurvy played a significant role in the collapse and abandonment of La Isabela within four years. She directed an excavation in the Mexican port city of Campeche, where upon analysis of strontium isotopes in teeth, researchers identified what may be the earliest African Diaspora individuals in the Americas.

Tiesler's publications have been cited over 1,000 times and has an h-index of 22. Her lab has compiled a database of 12,000 burials, where her team has worked on at least 6,000 burials directly.

== Selected bibliography ==
=== Papers ===
- Andrea Cucina and Vera Tiesler. Dental caries and antemortem tooth loss in the Northern Peten area, Mexico: a biocultural perspective on social status differences among the Classic Maya. American Journal of Physical Anthropology. 2003.
- T Douglas Price, Vera Tiesler and James H Burton. Early African diaspora in colonial Campeche, Mexico: strontium isotopic evidence. American Journal of Physical Anthropology. 2006.
- T Douglas Price, James H Burton, Paul D Fullagar, Lori E Wright, Jane E Buikstra, and Vera Tiesler. Strontium isotopes and the study of human mobility in ancient Mesoamerica. Latin American Antiquity. 2008.
- Vera Tiesler. The bioarchaeology of artificial cranial modifications: New approaches to head shaping and its meanings in Pre-Columbian Mesoamerica and beyond. Springer Science & Business Media. 2013.

=== Books ===
- Vera Tiesler and Andrea Cucina. Janaab' Pakal of Palenque. The University of Arizona Press. 2006. ISBN 9780816525102.
- Vera Tiesler.Ancient Maya Teeth Dental Modification, Cosmology, and Social Identity in Mesoamerica. The University of Texas Press. 2024. ISBN 9781477327579.
