= Carlos Aguirre (equestrian) =

Mexican equestrian

Personal information
- Born: 4 June 1952 (age 74)
- Height: 178 cm (5 ft 10 in)
- Weight: 64 kg (141 lb)

Sport
- Sport: Equestrianism
Medal record
Representing Mexico
Pan American Games
Silver medal – second place	1975 Mexico City	Team jumping
Bronze medal – third place	1979 San Juan	Team jumping

Carlos Aguirre (born 4 June 1952) is a retired Mexican show jumper who won team medals at the Pan American Games in 1975 and 1979. He placed 19th individually and 8th with the team at the 1976 Summer Olympics.
