= List of senators of Tarija =

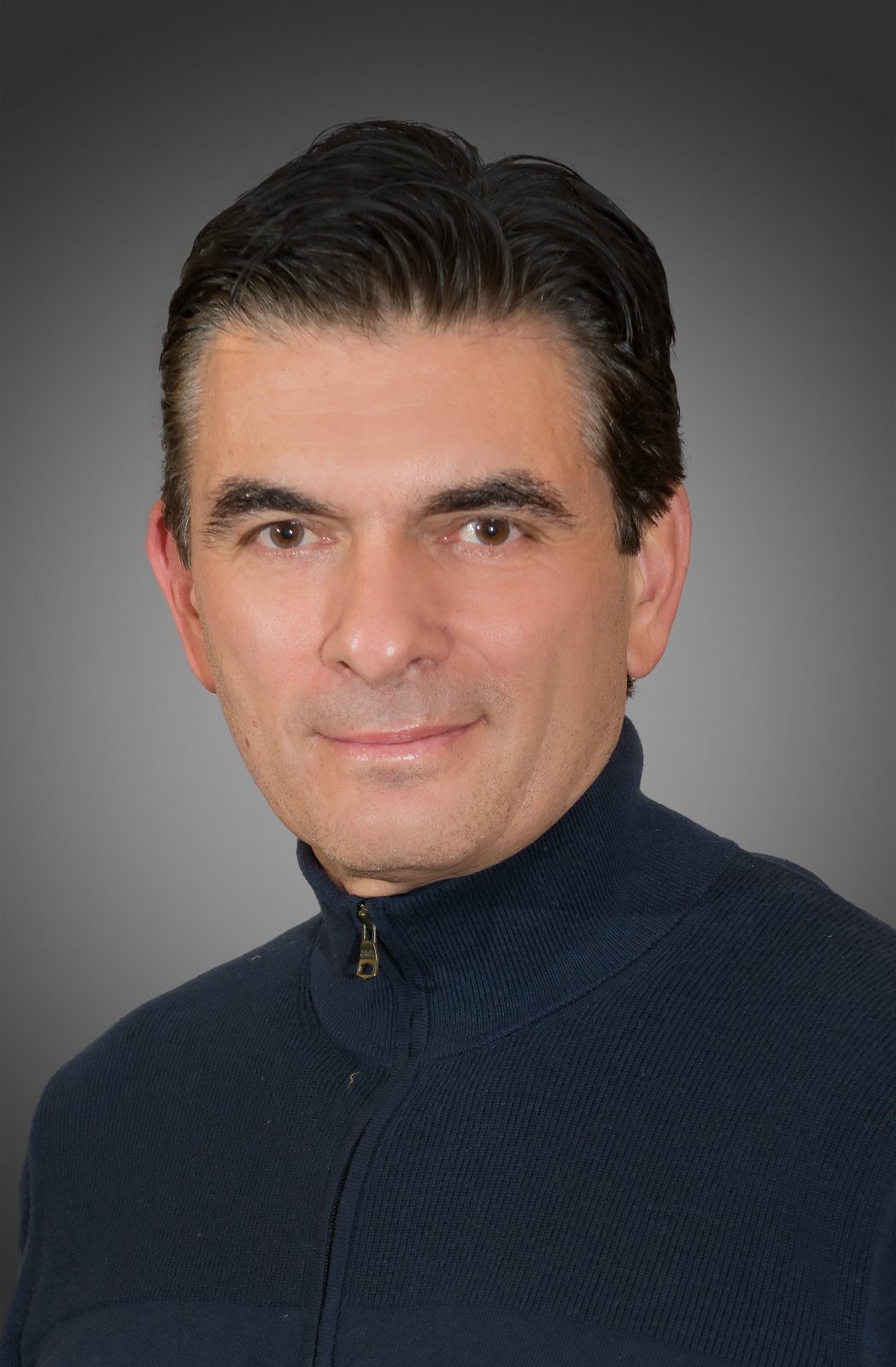
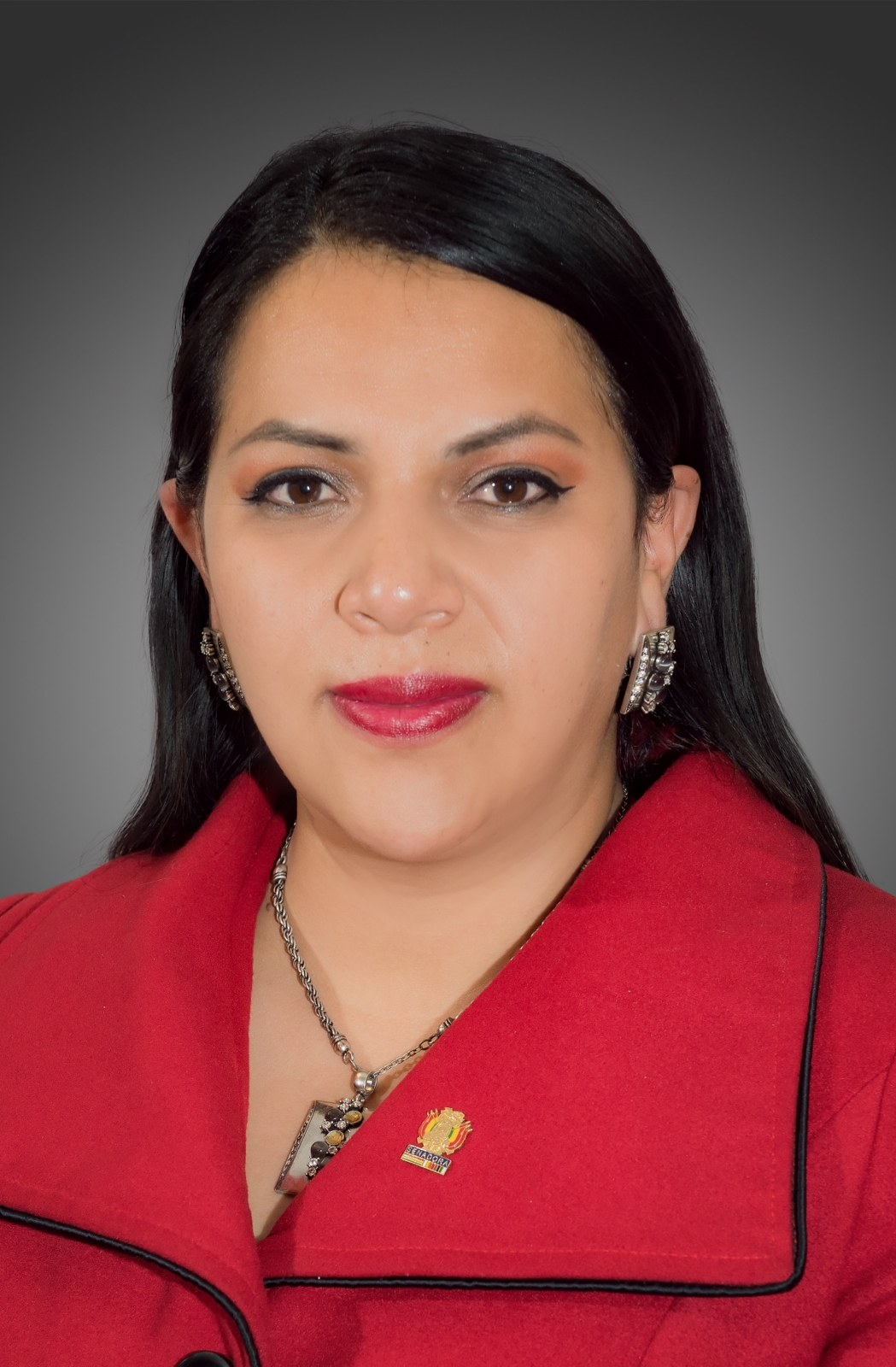
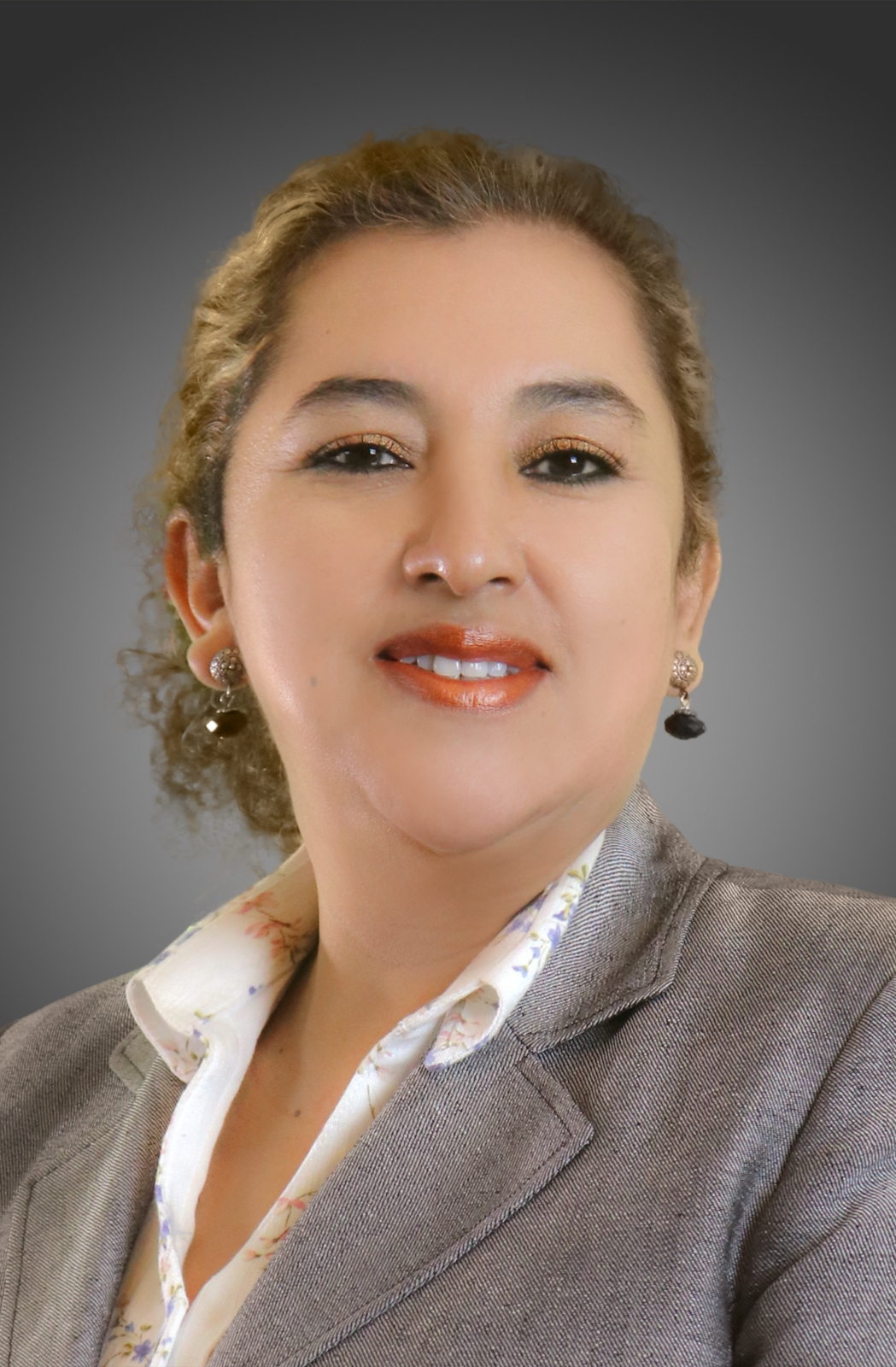
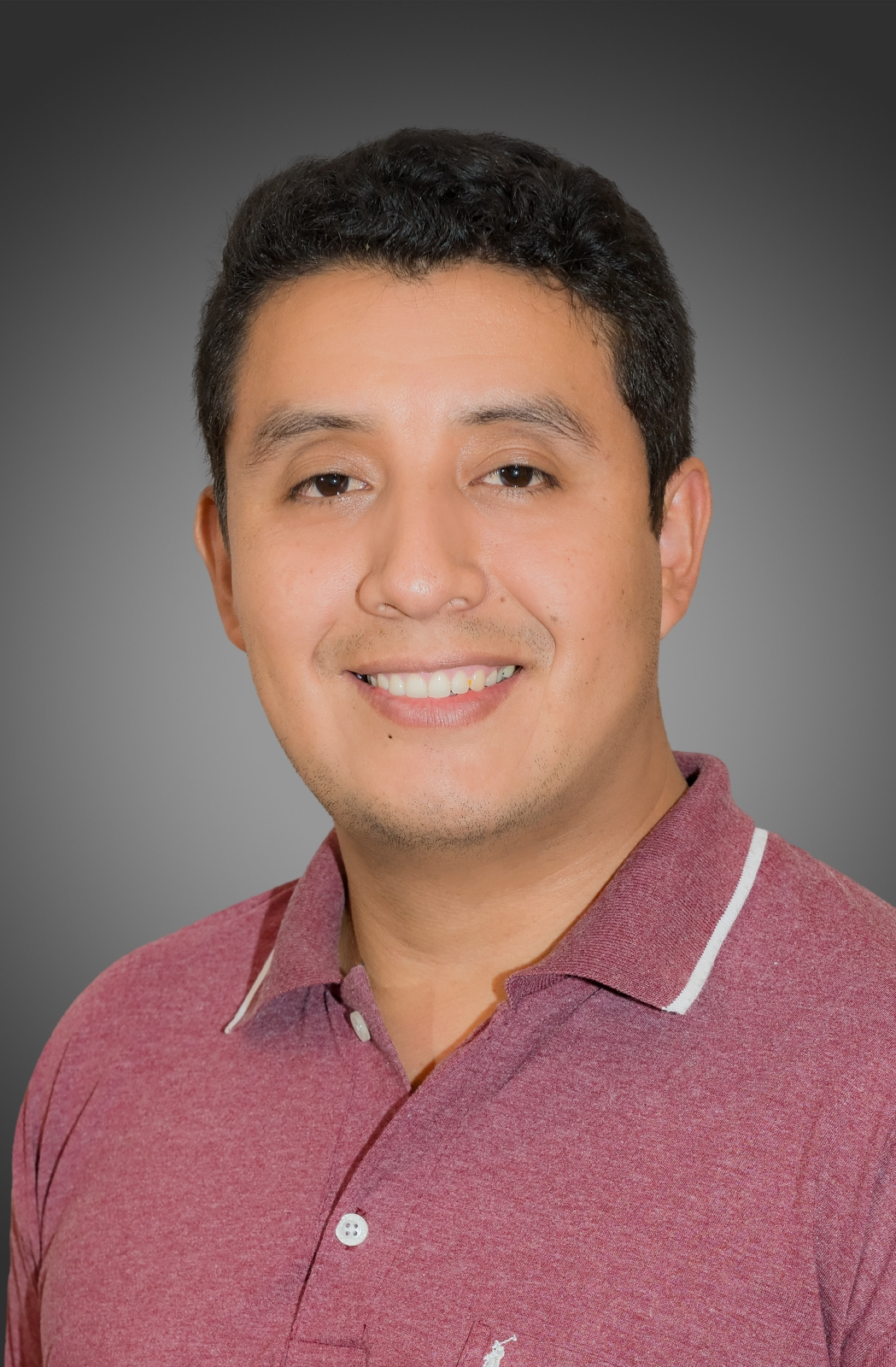
From left to right, top to bottom: Rodrigo Paz (CC), Nely Gallo (CC), Gladys Alarcón (MAS), and Miguel Rejas (MAS).

Tarija is represented in the Plurinational Legislative Assembly of Bolivia by four senators and their alternates elected through proportional representation. They serve five-year terms and qualify for reelection once. The current delegation comprises two senators from Civic Community (CC) and two from the Movement for Socialism (MAS-IPSP): Rodrigo Paz, Nely Gallo, Gladys Alarcón, and Miguel Rejas. Their respective alternates are: Zoya Zamora, Javier Martínez, Luis Casso Vaca, and Natividad Aramayo. Although the bicameral system was adopted in the 1831 Constitution and was maintained in subsequently promulgated constitutions, it can be affirmed that with the exception of very small intervals, the Senate did not, in fact, exercise its functions until the convocation of the 1882 legislature. Furthermore, due to heavy political instability and frequent military interventions since 1882, Bolivia did not experience a continuous, uninterrupted legislative session until 1982.

== List of senators ==
| Legislature | L. | Senator | Party | Term of office | | Alternate | Party | Term of office | | E. | Caucus | Ref. | |
| Legislature | L. | Senator | Party | Took office | Left office | Alternate | Party | Took office | Left office | E. | Caucus | Sen. | Alt. |
|---|---|---|---|---|---|---|---|---|---|---|---|---|---|
| 2010–2015 | 1° | Rhina Aguirre | MAS | 19 January 2010 | 18 January 2015 | Dario Gareca | MAS | 19 January 2010 | 18 January 2015 | 2009 | MAS | | |
| 2010–2015 | 2° | Juan Enrique Jurado | MAS | 19 January 2010 | 18 January 2015 | Mary Eva Vacaflor | MAS | 19 January 2010 | 18 January 2015 | 2009 | MAS | | |
| 2010–2015 | 1° | Marcelo Antezana | IND | 19 January 2010 | 18 January 2015 | Dora Burgos | IND | 19 January 2010 | 18 January 2015 | 2009 | CN | | |
| 2010–2015 | 2° | María Elena Méndez | IND | 19 January 2010 | 18 January 2015 | Luis Pedraza | IND | 19 January 2010 | 18 January 2015 | 2009 | CN | | |
| 2015–2020 | 1° | Milciades Peñaloza | MAS | 18 January 2015 | 3 November 2020 | Teresa Rodríguez | MAS | 23 January 2015 | 3 November 2020 | 2014 | MAS | | |
| 2015–2020 | 2° | Noemí Díaz | MAS | 18 January 2015 | 3 November 2020 | Henry Chávez | MAS | 23 January 2015 | 3 November 2020 | 2014 | MAS | | |
| 2015–2020 | 1° | Mirtha Arce | IND | 18 January 2015 | 3 November 2020 | Fernando Campero | UN | 23 January 2015 | 3 November 2020 | 2014 | UD | | |
| 2015–2020 | 1° | Víctor Hugo Zamora | UNIR | 18 January 2015 | 14 November 2019 | Rosario Rodríguez | MNR | 23 January 2015 | 16 January 2020 | 2014 | PDC | (Note: Partisan of UNIR. Resigned to become minister of hydrocarbons.) | (Note: Partisan of the MNR.) |
| 2015–2020 | 1° | Rosario Rodríguez | MNR | 16 January 2020 | 3 November 2020 | Vacant | | 16 January 2020 | 3 November 2020 | 2014 | PDC | | |
| 2020–2025 | 1° | Rodrigo Paz | PG | 3 November 2020 | Incumbent | Zoya Zamora | FRI | 9 November 2020 | Incumbent | 2020 | CC | (Note: Partisan of PG.) | (Note: Partisan of the FRI.) |
| 2020–2025 | 2° | Nely Gallo | FRI | 3 November 2020 | Incumbent | Javier Martínez | IND | 9 November 2020 | Incumbent | 2020 | CC | (Note: Partisan of the FRI.) | |
| 2020–2025 | 1° | Gladys Alarcón | MAS | 3 November 2020 | Incumbent | Luis Casso Vaca | MAS | 9 November 2020 | Incumbent | 2020 | MAS | | |
| 2020–2025 | 2° | Miguel Rejas | MAS | 3 November 2020 | Incumbent | Natividad Aramayo | MAS | 9 November 2020 | Incumbent | 2020 | MAS | | |
