= Carlos Aguirre (volleyball) =

Mexican volleyball player

Personal information
- Born: 10 October 1938 (age 87) Cutzamala, Mexico
- Height: 183 cm (6 ft 0 in)
- Weight: 72 kg (159 lb)

Sport
- Sport: Volleyball

Carlos Aguirre (born 10 October 1938) is a retired Mexican volleyball player. He was part of the Mexican teams that finished tenth at the 1968 Summer Olympics.
