= Siwinqani (Chuquisaca-Potosí) =

Mountain in Bolivia

- Location within Bolivia

Highest point
- Elevation: 3,120 m (10,240 ft)
- Coordinates: 18°32′03″S 65°31′12″W

Geography
- Location: Bolivia, Potosí Department
- Parent range: Andes

Siwinqani (Aymara siwinqa a kind of cactus, -ni a suffix, "the one with the siwinqa plant", also spelled Sevencani) is a mountain in the Bolivian Andes which reaches a height of approximately 3,120 m (10,240 ft). It is located at the border of the Chuquisaca Department, Oropeza Province, Poroma Municipality, and the Potosí Department, Chayanta Province, Ravelo Municipality.
