= Siwinqani =

Siwinqani (Aymara siwinqa a kind of cactus, -ni a suffix, "the one with the siwinqani cactus", also spelled Sehuencani, Sevencani, Sevengani, Sivingani) may refer to:

- Siwinqani (Arque), a mountain in the Arque Province, Cochabamba Department, Bolivia
- Siwinqani (Chuquisaca-Potosí), a mountain at the border of the Chuquisaca Department and the Potosí Department, Bolivia
- Siwinqani (Mizque), a mountain in the Mizque Province, Cochabamba Department, Bolivia
- Siwinqani (Potosí), a mountain in the Potosí Department, Bolivia
- Siwinqani (Tapacarí), a mountain in the Tapacarí Province, Cochabamba Department, Bolivia
