= Fausto Reinaga =

Bolivian indigenous writer and intellectual

- Born: José Félix Reinaga; March 27, 1906; Macha, Colquechaca Municipality, Bolivia
- Died: August 19, 1994 (aged 88); Santa Cruz de la Sierra, Bolivia
- Occupations: Writer, intellectual
- Children: 3

Fausto Reinaga (March 27, 1906 − August 19, 1994) was a Bolivian indigenous writer and intellectual.

== Biography ==
Fausto Reinaga was born José Félix Reinaga in the village of Macha, in the Colquechaca Municipality of Bolivia. His parents were Jenaro Reinaga and Alejandra Chavarria (great-great-granddaughter of the indigenous leader Tomás Katari). Both of his parents had participated in the uprising of Zarate Willka in 1898.

Part of his family did housework for the managers of the U.S. mining company Patiño Mines. Reinaga learned to read at the age of 16.

Out of four siblings, he was the only child to survive. His two older sisters were raped and murdered as children by white Bolivian landholders, while his younger brother Alberto died in the military service. The council of elders sent him to study in the city of Oruro to prepare him to lead his people. In accordance with his noble heritage, they gave him the indigenous name Ruphaj Katari. As a writer, Reinaga chose the pseudonym of Fausto Reinaga to express his admiration for Goethe's Faust.

In 1957, the Communist Party of Bolivia sent Reinaga to Leipzig (in East Germany) to take part in a congress of Communist trade unions. From there he went on to visit the Soviet Union. After his return, he attended a Communist conference held in Montevideo (Uruguay), where he was arrested. His book The Messianic Feeling of the Russian People was confiscated. The Communists did not help him, and he had to be repatriated by the Bolivian Embassy in Montevideo. He then entered into a crisis of conscience and distanced himself from the Communist Party of Bolivia. He traveled to Machu Picchu, which had been the capital of the Inca Empire, where he realized the power of his ancestors. Until then, Reinaga had been an ardent supporter of Marxism:

On my return from Europe I broke with all my intellectual tradition and all my Cholista production. I would have liked for it to have not existed. ... It is another phase, another path that I have found; and I have another goal on the horizon. In my works from 1940 to 1960 I sought the assimilation of the Indian through White-Mestizo cholaje. And in those that I published from 1964 to 1970 I sought the liberation of the Indian, prior destruction of White-Mestizo cholaje ... and I propose the Indian revolution.

— Fausto Reinaga, The Indian Revolution, 1969 (pg. 463).

Reinaga became the pioneer of Bolivian indigenism. On November 15, 1962, he founded the PIAK party (Party of Aymara and Keswa Indians), which was later known as PIB (Bolivian Indian Party).

In his later works, "The Indian Revolution" (1970), "Indian Thesis" (1971), "Amautic Thought" (1978), "Man" (1981), and in his last work, "Indian Thought" (1991), he argued for the superiority of the ideology and philosophy of the indigenous people over Western thought.

Christ and Marx must be removed from the head of the Indian.

— Fausto Reinaga

Inti and PachaMama - unlike the terrifying Jehova, breathe and exude love, and make man a cheerful being, lover of good and peace. Inka philosophy has the mission of ennobling life. Joy, love and peace are a social enjoyment.

— Fausto Reinaga, The Indian Revolution (pg. 397), 1969

Fausto Reinaga had three sons, including Ramiro Reynaga Burgoa.

== Works ==
Fausto Reinaga published more than 30 books: His most important work is La Revolucion India (The Indian Revolution).

His works were republished by his niece Hilda.
