= Emeliana Aiza =

Bolivian politician (born 1980)

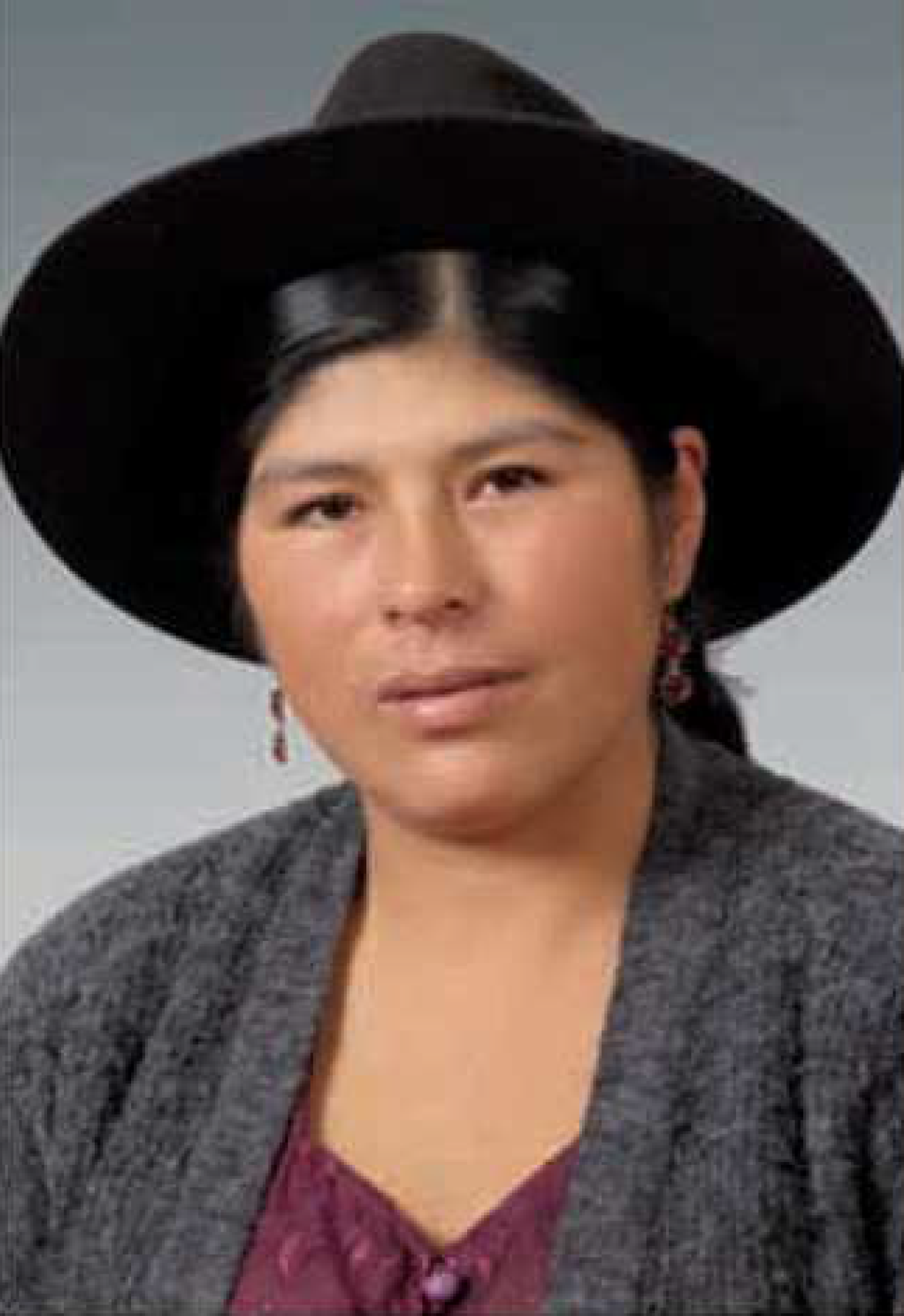
- Official portrait, 2014

Member of the Chamber of Deputies from Potosí
- In office 19 January 2010 – 18 January 2015
- Preceded by: Miriam Flores
- Succeeded by: Julio Huanca
- Constituency: Party list
- Substitute; 31 January 2006 – 19 January 2010
- Deputy: Severo Pacaja
- Preceded by: Anacleto Gabriel
- Succeeded by: Rita Callahuara
- Constituency: Circumscription 41 (Chayanta)

Personal details
- Born: Emeliana Aiza Parada; 10 May 1980 (age 46) Huayraña, Potosí, Bolivia
- Party: Movement for Socialism
- Occupation: Politician; trade unionist

Emeliana Aiza Parada (born 10 May 1980) is a Bolivian politician and trade unionist who served as a party-list member of the Chamber of Deputies from Potosí from 2010 to 2015. A member of the Movement for Socialism, she represented the same department as a substitute alongside Severo Pacaja from 2006 to 2010.

Orphaned at a young age, Aiza spent much of her early life working agricultural and farming jobs in her rural community. Starting in the late 1990s, she began rising through the ranks of northern Potosí's trade syndicates, capping off her union career as a member of the Chayanta Regional Women's Center. The position opened the way for a career in politics, a product of the peasant movement's alignment with the Movement for Socialism.

In 2005, following an unsuccessful bid for a seat on the Ocurí Municipal Council, Aiza was elected as a substitute member of the Chamber of Deputies. She won her own seat in the 2009 election, becoming one of the rare few members of the Movement for Socialism to achieve reelection. Elected deputy leader of her party's caucus in the lower chamber, Aiza twice assumed full leadership due to the resignation or absence of her predecessors. She was not nominated for a third term.

== Early life and career ==
Emeliana Aiza was born on 10 May 1980 in Huayraña, a small Quechua community situated in the Ocurí Municipality, part of the Chayanta Province of northern Potosí, one of the poorest and least economically developed regions of the country. The eldest of three sisters, Aiza spent a large part of her early life as head of household, a situation brought about by the death of both her parents, which left her orphaned by the age of 8. She dropped out of school to focus on working, making a modest living cultivating potatoes and attending to the livestock of her neighbors. Eventually, Aiza and her sisters saved enough money to set up their own small farm, allowing them to live independently of others.

Starting from the late 1990s, Aiza began assuming roles within her area's local peasant unions. She got her start in 1999 as a member of her community's syndicate, where she served as Huayraña's representative before larger unions. In 2000, she joined the provincial women's union and two years later acceded to the directorate of the Chayanta Regional Women's Center. During this time, she also attained membership within the Bartolina Sisa Confederation, the country's national women's organization.

== Chamber of Deputies ==
=== Election ===
Aiza's first foray into electoral politics came in 2004, when she was nominated to contest a seat on the Ocurí Municipal Council. Although unsuccessful in that endeavor, her name was kept in consideration for other posts, and in 2005, she was nominated for a seat in the Chamber of Deputies in representation of the Movement for Socialism (MAS-IPSP).

As a product of its close alliance with the peasant movement, the MAS granted rural trade syndicates ample autonomy to select their own candidates in single-member constituencies. In northern Potosí, where traditional mechanisms of choosing leaders remained common practice, the designation adhered to the principle of rotation: in 2002, the candidate had been from Pocoata, so for 2005, the unions instead opted for Severo Pacaja of Ravelo, accompanied by Aiza of Ocurí as his substitute. The pair jointly contested the country's 41st circumscription and were elected to represent Potosí's Chayanta Province in the lower chamber.

In 2009, Aiza was nominated for reelection as a full member of the Chamber of Deputies. The selection was almost unheard of within the MAS, which had opted to near-entirely renew its roster of representatives that cycle. Unlike in 2005, where she ran individually, this time, Aiza was incorporated onto the MAS's electoral list. Although disadvantaged by a bottom placement on the party's slate of candidates, she won nonetheless, owing to Evo Morales's near-eighty-percent victory in Potosí, which garnered the MAS an almost clean sweep of the department's parliamentary delegation.

=== Tenure ===
Shortly after assuming office, Aiza was elected to serve as deputy leader of the MAS caucus in the Chamber of Deputies. Her service as second-in-command to leader Rebeca Delgado lasted until early June, at which point Aiza succeeded Delgado following the latter's surprise resignation. Aiza's own tenure was also cut short in early 2011, after an announced increase in the price of gas drew pushback from her party – the incident reflected simmering tensions in the country after a hike in gas prices the previous year, dubbed the gasolinazo, provoked intense general strikes. In her place, Edwin Tupa was elected to lead the MAS caucus, while Aiza returned to her former position as deputy leader. However, Tupa's own troubles forced him to take an extended leave of absence, leading Aiza to once again assume the post of caucus leader for the duration of 2011.

Unlike in 2009, Aiza was not nominated for reelection to a third term in 2014, concluding her active participation in politics. In addition to public service, Aiza's decade-long political career provided opportunities for her to complete the education she was forced to abandon in her youth. In 2004, in representation of a regional workers' federation, she participated in the first-ever Leadership for Transformation Program, a political education course sponsored by the CAF – Development Bank and International IDEA. Throughout her service in the Chamber of Deputies, Aiza regularly attended night courses at the Gualberto Villarroel School in La Paz, from which she received her secondary school baccalaureate in 2013.

=== Commission assignments ===
- Constitution, Legislation, and Electoral System Commission
  - Constitutional Review and Legislative Harmonization Committee (2013–2014)
- Planning, Economic Policy, and Finance Commission
  - Financial, Monetary, and Insurance Policy Committee (2012–2013)
- Plural Economy, Production, and Industry Commission
  - Agriculture and Animal Husbandry Committee (2011–2012)
- Education and Health Commission
  - Education Committee (Secretary: 2014–2015)
- International Relations and Migrant Protection Commission
  - International Relations, Migrant Protection, and International Organizations Committee (2010–2011)

== Electoral history ==
Electoral history of Emeliana Aiza
Year	Office	Party	Votes			Result	Ref.
Year	Office	Party	Total	%	P.	Result	Ref.
2004	Councillor	Movement for Socialism	770	29.01%	2nd	Lost	(Note: Presented on an electoral list. The data shown represents the share of the vote the entire party/alliance received in that constituency.)
2005	Substitute deputy	Movement for Socialism	5,437	45.30%	1st	Won	
2009	Deputy	Movement for Socialism	243,855	78.32%	1st	Won	
Source: Plurinational Electoral Organ | Electoral Atlas

Chamber of Deputies of Bolivia
Preceded by Anacleto Gabriel	Substitute Member of the Chamber of Deputies from Potosí circumscription 41; 2006–2010	Succeeded by Rita Callahuara
Preceded by Miriam Flores	Member of the Chamber of Deputies from Potosí; 2010–2015	Succeeded by Julio Huanca
Party political offices
Preceded by Rebeca Delgado	Leader of the Chamber of Deputies; Movement for Socialism Caucus; 2010–2011	Succeeded by Edwin Tupa
Preceded by Edwin Tupa	Acting Leader of the Chamber of Deputies; Movement for Socialism Caucus; 2011	Succeeded by Roberto Rojas
