= Apachita =

Apachita (Aymara and Quechua for the place of transit of an important pass in the principal routes of the Andes and for a stone cairn, a little pile of rocks built along the trail in the high mountains, also spelled Apacheta) may refer to:

- Apacheta (cairn)
- Apachita (Arequipa), a mountain in the Arequipa Region, Peru
- Apacheta-Aguilucho volcanic complex, a group of volcanoes associated with a geothermy project in Chile
- Apachita (Chayanta), a mountain in the Chayanta Province, Potosí Department, Bolivia
- Apachita (Ingavi), a mountain in the Ingavi Province, La Paz Department, Bolivia
- Apachita (Inquisivi), a mountain in the Inquisivi Province, La Paz Department, Bolivia
- Apachita (Pando), a mountain in the José Manuel Pando Province, La Paz Department, Bolivia
- Apachita (Puno), a mountain in the Puno Region, Peru
- Apachita (Potosí), a mountain in the Potosí Department, Bolivia
