= Toroca Canton =

Toroca
- Canton
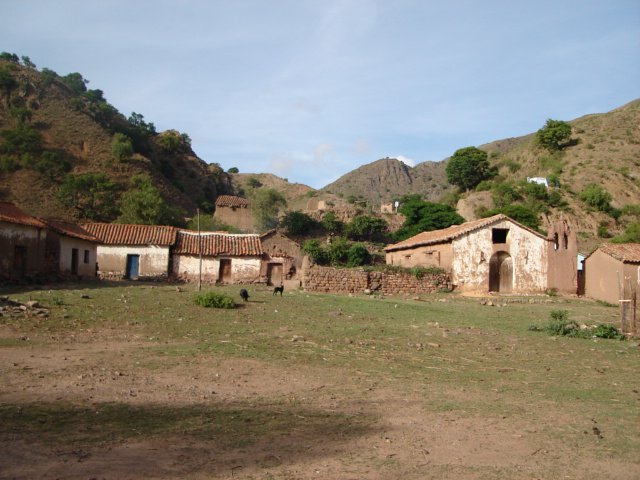
- The small village of Toroca

- Location of Toroca within Bolivia
- Coordinates: 18°45′S 65°27′W
- Country: Bolivia
- Department: Potosí Department
- Province: Chayanta Province
- Municipality: Ravelo Municipality
- Seat: Toroca

Population (2001)
  - Total: 1,636
- Time zone: UTC-4 (BST)

Toroca is one of the cantons of the Ravelo Municipality, the second municipal section of the Chayanta Province in the Potosí Department in Bolivia. During the census of 2001 it had 1,636 inhabitants. Its seat is Toroca, a small village with a population of 20 in 2001.
