= Katariri =

Mountain in Bolivia

- Location within Bolivia

Highest point
- Elevation: 3,224 m (10,577 ft)
- Coordinates: 18°31′09″S 65°32′51″W

Geography
- Location: Bolivia, Potosí Department
- Parent range: Andes

Katariri (Aymara katari, a big viper, -ri a suffix, also spelled Catariri) is a 3,224 m (10,577 ft) high mountain in the Bolivian Andes. It is located on the border of the Chuquisaca Department, Oropeza Province, Poroma Municipality, and the Potosí Department, Chayanta Province, Ravelo Municipality. It lies northeast of Chullpa Urqu.
