= Misk'a Urqu =

Mountain in Bolivia

- Location within Bolivia

Highest point
- Elevation: 3,260 m (10,700 ft)
- Coordinates: 19°11′34″S 65°20′56″W

Geography
- Location: Bolivia, Chuquisaca Department
- Parent range: Andes

Misk'a Urqu (Quechua misk'ay to stumble, urqu mountain, also spelled Mizkha Orkho) is a mountain in the Bolivian Andes which reaches a height of approximately 3,260 m (10,700 ft). It is located in the Chuquisaca Department, Oropeza Province, Yotala Municipality. Misk'a Urqu lies southeast of Chullpa Urqu. The Misk'a River (Quechua: Misk'a Mayu) originates east of the mountain. Its waters flow to the Pillku Mayu (which is Quechua for "red river").
