= Ch'aki Mayu =

Ch'aki Mayu (Quechua: ch'aki dry, mayu river, "dry river", also spelled Chaqui Mayo, Chaqui Mayu, Chaquí Mayu, Chaquimayo, Chaquimayu) may refer to:

- Ch'aki Mayu (Chuquisaca), a mountain in the Chuquisaca Department, Bolivia
- Ch'aki Mayu (Cochabamba), a river in the Cochabamba Department, Bolivia
- Ch'aki Mayu (Potosí), a river in the Potosí Department, Bolivia
