= Yana Urqu (Chayanta) =

Mountain in Bolivia

- Location within Bolivia

Highest point
- Elevation: 3,902 m (12,802 ft)
- Coordinates: 18°46′39″S 65°36′16″W

Geography
- Location: Bolivia, Potosí Department
- Parent range: Andes

Yana Urqu (Quechua yana black, urqu mountain, "black mountain", also spelled Yana Orkho) is a 3,902-metre-high (12,802 ft) mountain in the Bolivian Andes. It is located in the Potosí Department, Chayanta Province, Ravelo Municipality.
