= Tuqtu Q'asa =

Mountain in Bolivia

- Location within Bolivia

Highest point
- Elevation: 3,120 m (10,240 ft)
- Coordinates: 18°33′35″S 65°30′28″W

Geography
- Location: Bolivia, Chuquisaca Department
- Parent range: Andes

Tuqtu Q'asa (Quechua tuqtu broody hen, q'asa mountain pass, "hen's pass", also spelled Tojto Khasa) is a mountain in the Bolivian Andes which reaches a height of approximately 3,120 m (10,240 ft). It is located in the Chuquisaca Department, Oropeza Province, Poroma Municipality. Tuqtu Q'asa lies southeast of Markawi.
