= Yotala =

- Town
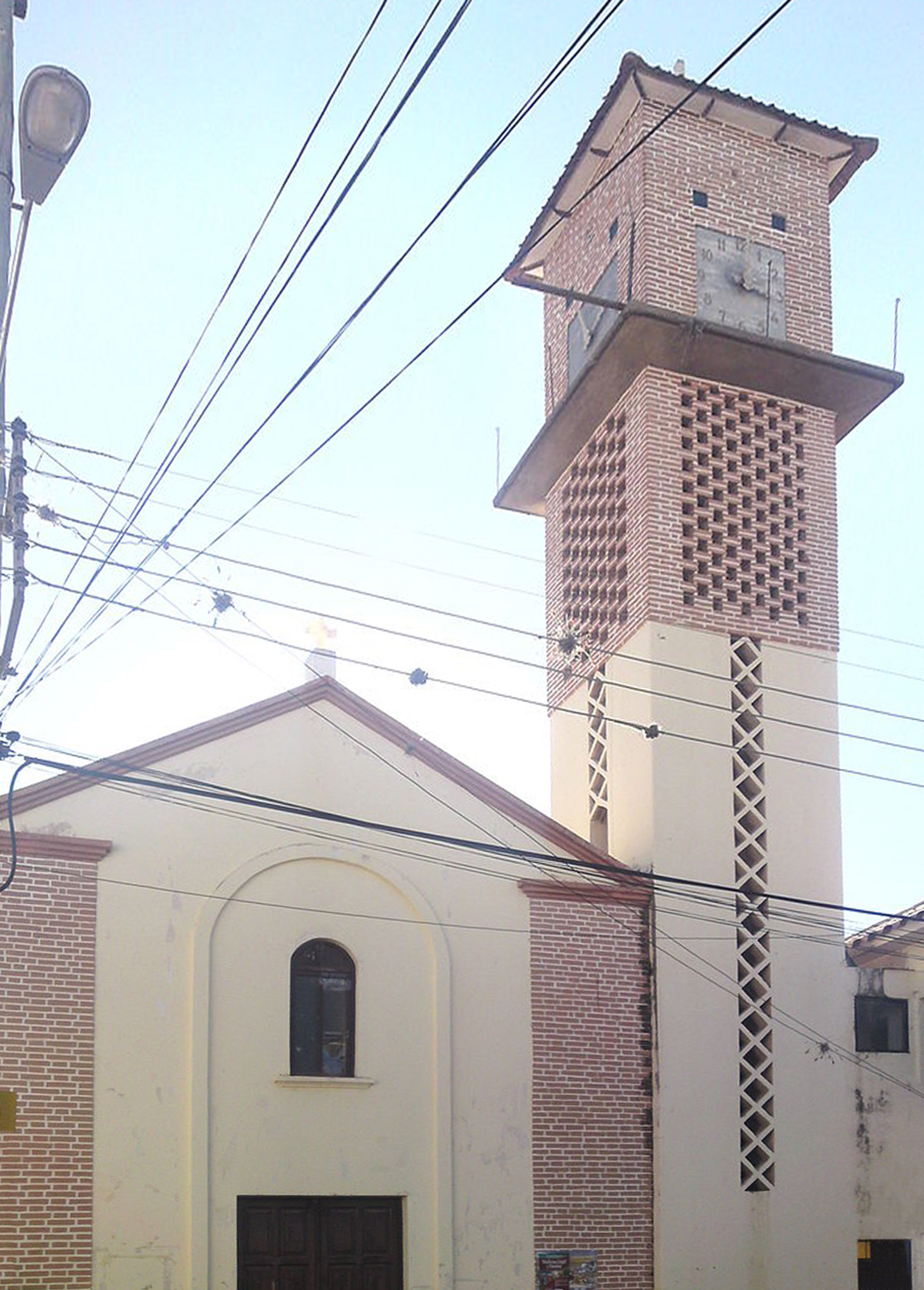
- Catedral de la Villa de Yotala

- Location within Bolivia
- Coordinates: 19°14′S 65°16′W
- Country: Bolivia
- Department: Chuquisaca Department
- Province: Oropeza Province
- Municipality: Yotala Municipality

Population (2001)
  - Total: 1,538
- Time zone: UTC-4 (BOT)

Yotala is a small town in the Chuquisaca Department of Bolivia.

== Climate ==
Climate data for Yotala, elevation 2,520 m (8,270 ft)
Month	Jan	Feb	Mar	Apr	May	Jun	Jul	Aug	Sep	Oct	Nov	Dec	Year
Mean daily maximum °C (°F)	25.6 (78.1)	25.3 (77.5)	25.3 (77.5)	25.5 (77.9)	25.0 (77.0)	24.3 (75.7)	24.2 (75.6)	25.1 (77.2)	26.1 (79.0)	27.0 (80.6)	27.3 (81.1)	26.5 (79.7)	25.6 (78.1)
Daily mean °C (°F)	18.7 (65.7)	18.5 (65.3)	18.2 (64.8)	17.5 (63.5)	15.0 (59.0)	13.4 (56.1)	13.3 (55.9)	14.9 (58.8)	16.8 (62.2)	18.4 (65.1)	19.2 (66.6)	19.0 (66.2)	16.9 (62.4)
Mean daily minimum °C (°F)	11.7 (53.1)	11.7 (53.1)	11.0 (51.8)	9.4 (48.9)	5.0 (41.0)	2.4 (36.3)	2.2 (36.0)	4.6 (40.3)	7.4 (45.3)	9.8 (49.6)	11.0 (51.8)	11.6 (52.9)	8.2 (46.7)
Average precipitation mm (inches)	131.3 (5.17)	105.5 (4.15)	72.8 (2.87)	18.0 (0.71)	3.0 (0.12)	2.5 (0.10)	2.2 (0.09)	5.6 (0.22)	22.1 (0.87)	41.6 (1.64)	47.8 (1.88)	99.0 (3.90)	551.4 (21.72)
Average precipitation days	12.3	9.5	7.3	2.5	0.7	0.5	0.4	1.2	3.0	4.8	6.0	9.8	58
Average relative humidity (%)	66.5	69.4	66.0	63.6	56.0	52.0	50.4	47.8	53.3	55.1	57.0	62.2	58.3
Source: Servicio Nacional de Meteorología e Hidrología de Bolivia
