= Jatun Q'asa (Chuquisaca) =

Mountain in Bolivia

- Location within Bolivia

Highest point
- Elevation: 3,568 m (11,706 ft)
- Coordinates: 19°08′55″S 65°21′49″W

Geography
- Location: Bolivia, Chuquisaca Department
- Parent range: Andes

Jatun Q'asa (Quechua jatun, hatun big, great, q'asa mountain pass, "great mountain pass", also spelled Jatun Khasa) is a 3,568-metre-high (11,706 ft) mountain in the Bolivian Andes. It is located in the Chuquisaca Department, Oropeza Province, on the border of the municipalities of Sucre and Yotala.
