= Inti Rumi =

Mountain in Bolivia

- Location within Bolivia

Highest point
- Elevation: 3,680 m (12,070 ft)
- Coordinates: 19°01′37″S 65°23′29″W

Geography
- Location: Bolivia, Chuquisaca Department
- Parent range: Andes

Inti Rumi (Quechua inti sun or Inti sun god, rumi stone, "sun (or Inti) stone") is a mountain in the Bolivian Andes which reaches a height of approximately 3,680 m (12,070 ft). It is located in the Chuquisaca Department, Oropeza Province, Sucre Municipality.
