= Ocurí, Potosí =

Ocurí
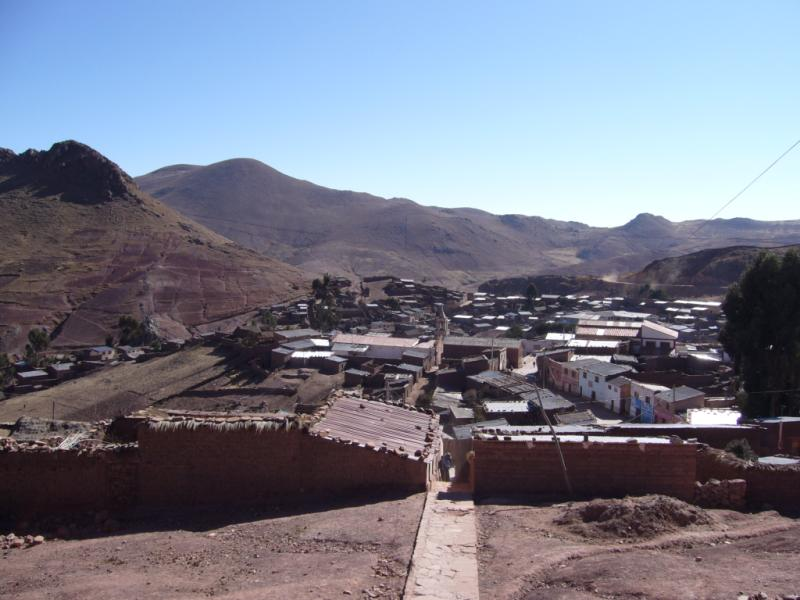

- Location in Bolivia
- Coordinates: 18°50′33″S 65°47′47″W
- Country: Bolivia
- Department: Potosí Department
- Province: Chayanta Province
- Elevation: 13,209 ft (4,026 m)

Population
  - Total: 2,200
- Time zone: UTC-4 (BOT)

Ocurí is a town in the Bolivian Potosí Department.

Ocurí is the administrative center of the Ocurí Municipality in the Chayanta Province. It is located about 100 km north of Potosí, the department capital, on a mountain ridge at an elevation of 4,026 m on Río Ocurí, a tributary of Río Guadalupe and Río Guadalajara.

Ocurí is situated on Route 6, the direct connection between Oruro and Sucre. Route 6 of almost 1,000 km length connects the departments of Chuquisaca, Santa Cruz, Potosí und Oruro with each other.

Ocurí has a population of about 2,200 inhabitants.
