= Mulli Urqu =

Mountain in Bolivia

- Location within Bolivia

Highest point
- Elevation: 2,906 m (9,534 ft)
- Coordinates: 19°15′33″S 65°17′52″W

Geography
- Location: Bolivia, Chuquisaca Department
- Parent range: Andes

Mulli Urqu (Quechua mulli Peruvian pepper tree, urqu mountain, "Peruvian pepper tree mountain", also spelled Molle Orkho) is a 2,906-metre-high (9,534 ft) mountain in the Bolivian Andes. It is located in the Chuquisaca Department, Oropeza Province, Yotala Municipality. Mulli Urqu lies west of the Kachi Mayu which is a left tributary of the Pillku Mayu (Quechua for "red river").
