= Colquechaca =

Colquechaca Qullqichaka
- Town
- Location within Bolivia
- Coordinates: 18°42′00″S 66°00′10″W
- Country: Bolivia
- Department: Potosí Department
- Province: Chayanta Province
- Municipality: Colquechaca Municipality
- Elevation: 13,680 ft (4,170 m)

Population (2001)
  - Total: 1,816
- Time zone: UTC-4 (BOT)

Colquechaca is a small town in Bolivia, capital of the Province of Chayanta in the northern region of the Department of Potosí. In 2009 it has an estimated population of 1,753. It is the highest city in Bolivia, at 4,170 meters (13,680 feet) above sea level, with residences up to 4,235 meters (13,894 feet).
