= Q'ara Quta (Potosí) =

Lake in Bolivia

- Location within Bolivia Location within South America
- Interactive map of Q'ara Quta
- Location: Potosí Department, Chayanta Province, Bolivia
- Coordinates: 18°37′55″S 66°06′45″W
- Primary outflows: Rio Colojsa

Q'ara Quta (Aymara q'ara bare, bald, quta lake, "bare lake", Hispanicized spellings Khara Kkota) is a Bolivian lake near hamlet Caracota in the Potosí Department, Chayanta Province, Pocoata Municipality.
