= Chullqi Mayu =

- Etymology: Quechua

Location
- Country: Bolivia
- Region: Chuquisaca Department
- Municipality: Yotalla Municipality

Physical characteristics
- Source: Yotalla Municipality
- Mouth: Pillku Mayu

Chullqi Mayu (Quechua chullqi wrinkle, mayu river, "wrinkle river", Hispanicized spelling Chullqui Mayu) is a Bolivian river in the Chuquisaca Department, Oropeza Province, Yotalla Municipalities. It is a left tributary of the Pillku Mayu.

== See also ==
- List of rivers of Bolivia
