= Poroma Municipality =

Poroma Municipality is the third municipal section of the Oropeza Province in the Chuquisaca Department in Bolivia.

== Government ==
The Mayor of Poroma is Pascual Vera Tapia, who was elected in the March 2026 elections.

Poroma has a municipal council with five seats, as do all municipalities with populations up to 15,000.

| Seat | Type | Name | Party / Political Organization |
|---|---|---|---|
| 1 | Member | Anastacio Ronal Padilla Cabrera | PATRIA-UNIDOS |
| 1 | Alternate | Tomasa Barrón Caiguara | PATRIA-UNIDOS |
| 2 | Member | Juana Barrón Caiguara | AGN |
| 2 | Alternate | Sebastián Calle Choque | AGN |
| 3 | Member | Martína Maras Cruz | PATRIA-UNIDOS |
| 3 | Alternate | Sixto Maturano Medrano | PATRIA-UNIDOS |
| 4 | Member | Juvenal Ugarte Salas | AGN |
| 4 | Alternate | Hilaria Ticona Huarayo | AGN |
| 5 | Member | Walberto Baraona Garnica | PATRIA-UNIDOS |
| 5 | Alternate | Mercedes Romero Medrano | PATRIA-UNIDOS |
Source: Supreme Electoral Tribunal.

== Population ==
Population in Recent Censuses
| ! 1992 | 2001 | 2012 | 2024 |
|---|---|---|---|
| 13,659 | 16,966 | 16,532 | 13,649 |

Population pyramid 2024
| % | Males | Age | Females | % |
|---|---|---|---|---|
| 0.6 | | 85+ | | 1.1 |
| 0.6 | | 80–84 | | 0.8 |
| 1 | | 75–79 | | 0.9 |
| 1.7 | | 70–74 | | 1.5 |
| 2.1 | | 65–69 | | 2 |
| 2.7 | | 60–64 | | 2.4 |
| 2.3 | | 55–59 | | 2.3 |
| 2.4 | | 50–54 | | 2.4 |
| 2.6 | | 45–49 | | 2.7 |
| 2.8 | | 40–44 | | 2.6 |
| 2.6 | | 35–39 | | 2.3 |
| 2.3 | | 30–34 | | 2.2 |
| 3.2 | | 25–29 | | 2.7 |
| 3.5 | | 20–24 | | 3.4 |
| 4.7 | | 15–19 | | 4.6 |
| 6.2 | | 10–14 | | 5.7 |
| 5.6 | | 5–9 | | 5.2 |
| 4.3 | | 0–4 | | 4 |
- Source: 2024 Bolivian Census

== Languages and Indigenous identification ==
Ethnic identification (2024)
| Group | Population | % |
|---|---|---|
| Quechua | 9,408 | 68.9% |
| Qhara Qhara | 662 | 4.9% |
| Campesino | 536 | 3.9% |
| Unspecified Indigenous | 240 | 1.8% |
Source: 2024 Bolivian Census

Languages spoken
| Language | 2024 speakers | 2024% | 2012 speakers | 2012% |
|---|---|---|---|---|
| Quechua | 11,622 | 85.1% | 12,912 | 78.1% |
| Spanish | 8,017 | 58.7% | 7,387 | 44.7% |
Source: 2024 Bolivian Census

== Communities ==
The following communities are located within the municipality:

- Calizaya
- Challcha
- Choco Churo
- Colquebamba
- Exaltacion
- Huayra Pata
- Khula Pucara
- Katariri
- Lampasuni
- Ollisco
- Palajla
- Pangorasi
- Poroma
- Sacabamba
- San Jose de Churu
- Soicoco
- Yanani
- Chillcani
- Cera Cera
- Chijmuri
- Huayna Huayna
- Miskha Pampa
- Piocera
- Cucuri
- Huapy
- Irocota
- Saychuma
- Manzanal de Porras
- Marcavi
- Pojpo
- Portillo
- Retiro
- Romeral
- Quitarje
- Tapala
- Teja Huasi
- San Juan de Orcas
- Kullku
- Kolka
- Carpa Huasi
- Pucara
- Carpachaca
- Calasamana
- Jachuy Kuri
- Jatun Kuri
- Churuni
- Sapse
- Quila Quililla
- Luje
- La Palca
- Yululo
- Koripunco
- Soto Khasa
- Alamos
- Chivitos
- Curcunchi
- Kaynacas
- La Barranca
- Mendoza
- Milluni
- Sanabria
- Siccha Alta
- Sijcha Baja
- Uruquilla
- Sokosniyus
- Robledos
- Zanabria
- Sanabria Alta
- Pampas Alta
- Chaupi Barranca
- Jatun Barranca
- Juchuy Barranca
- Aguila Orcko
- Copa Billque
- La Kasa
- Molle Orkho
- Pomanasa Alta
- Pomanasa
- Kaspi Cancha
- Kaspicanchita
- Uruhuayo Alto
- Uruhuayo Centro
- Uruhuayo Bajo
- Durasnillo
- Huañoma Alta
- Huañoma Baja
- Mariquilla
- Thola Pampa
- Viru Viru
- Kellu Kellu
- Challcha
- Toco Cala

== Poverty and Basic Services ==
Poroma Municipality: Poverty and Basic Service Access
| Location | Poverty (NBI) | | | Lack of Water Access | | | Lack of Sanitation Access | | |
| | 2012 | 2024 | Change | 2001 | 2024 | Change | 2001 | 2024 | Change |
|---|---|---|---|---|---|---|---|---|---|
| Poroma | 96% | 88% | ▼ -8% | 80% | 34% | ▼ -45% | 96% | 84% | ▼ -12% |
| Chuquisaca | NA% | NA% | - | NA% | NA% | - | NA% | NA% | - |
| Bolivia | 45% | 30% | ▼ -15% | 27% | 13% | ▼ -14% | 59% | 36% | ▼ -22% |
NBI indicates a Unsatisfied Basic Needs definition for poverty. Source: INE Bolivia, 2024 Bolivian Census
