= Inka Mach'ay, Bolivia =

Archaeological site in Bolivia

Inka Mach'ay
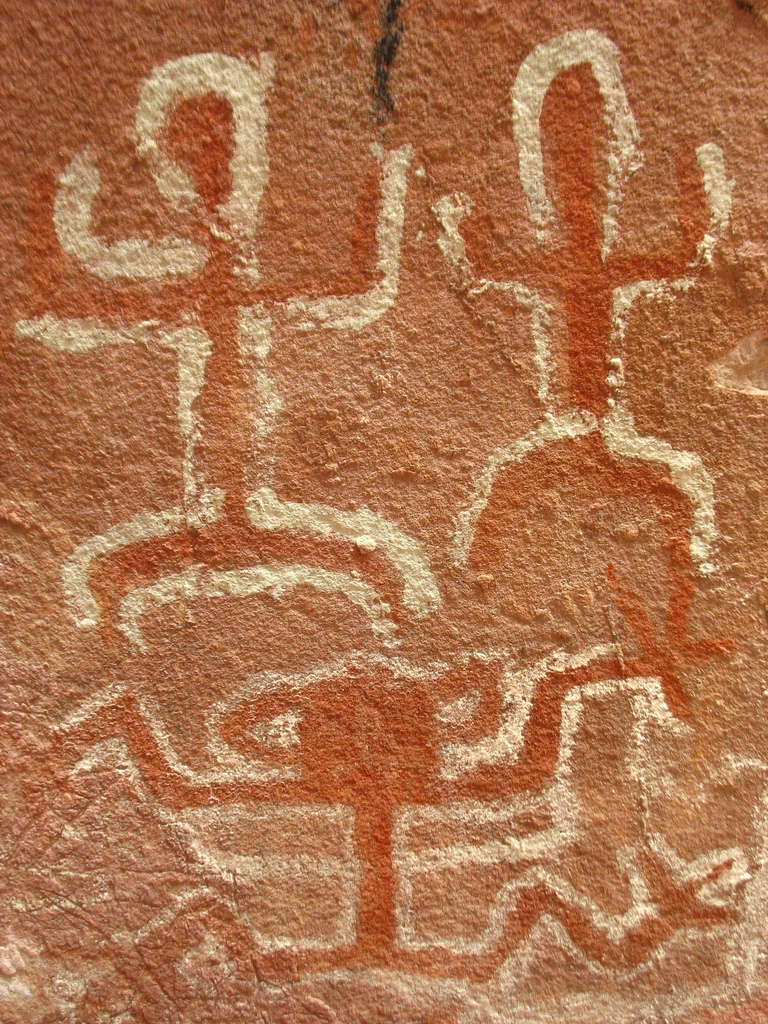
- Cave paintings of Inka Mach'ay
- Interactive map of Inka Mach'ay
- Location: Bolivia
- Region: Chuquisaca Department, Oropeza Province

Site notes
- Height: 3,510 metres (11,516 ft)

Inka Mach'ay (Quechua inka Inca, mach'ay cave, "Inca cave", Hispanicized spellings Incamachay, Inca Machay) is an archaeological site in Bolivia. It is situated in the Chuquisaca Department, Oropeza Province, Sucre Municipality, at a height of 3,510 metres (11,516 ft). Inka Mach'ay was declared a National Monument on May 27, 1958, by Supreme Decrete No. 4954.
