= P'aqla Urqu =

Mountain in Bolivia

- Location within Bolivia

Highest point
- Elevation: 3,260 m (10,700 ft)
- Coordinates: 19°12′37″S 65°21′03″W

Geography
- Location: Bolivia, Chuquisaca Department
- Parent range: Andes

P'aqla Urqu (Quechua p'aqla bald, urqu mountain, "bald mountain", also spelled Phajla Orkho) is a 3,038-metre-high (9,967 ft) mountain in the Bolivian Andes. It is located in the Chuquisaca Department, Oropeza Province, Yotala Municipality. P'aqla Urqu lies at the Panti Mayu which is a left tributary of the Pillku Mayu (Quechua for "red river").
