= Kuntur Qaqa (Chayanta) =

Mountain in Bolivia

- Location within Bolivia

Highest point
- Elevation: 3,436 m (11,273 ft)
- Coordinates: 18°49′30″S 65°28′37″W

Geography
- Location: Bolivia, Potosí Department
- Parent range: Andes

Kuntur Qaqa (Quechua kuntur condor, qaqa rock, "condor rock", also spelled Condor Khakha) is a 3,436-metre-high (11,273 ft) mountain in the Bolivian Andes. It is located in the Potosí Department, Chayanta Province, Ravelo Municipality, southeast of Ravelo.
