= Ch'usiqani (Chuquisaca) =

Mountain in Bolivia

- Location within Bolivia

Highest point
- Elevation: 3,612 m (11,850 ft)
- Coordinates: 18°36′36″S 65°24′54″W

Geography
- Location: Bolivia, Chuquisaca Department
- Parent range: Andes

Ch'usiqani (Aymara ch'usiqa (barn) owl, -ni a suffix to indicate ownership, "the one with the owl (or owls)", also spelled Chusekani, erroneously also Chudexani) is a 3,612-metre-high (11,850 ft) mountain in the Bolivian Andes. It is located in the Chuquisaca Department, Oropeza Province, Poroma Municipality.
