= Yana Qaqa (Chayanta) =

Mountain in Bolivia

- Location within Bolivia

Highest point
- Elevation: 3,944 m (12,940 ft)
- Coordinates: 18°46′56″S 65°42′53″W

Geography
- Location: Bolivia, Potosí Department
- Parent range: Andes

Yana Qaqa (Quechua for the place of transit of an important pass in the principal routes of the Andes; name in the Andes yana black, qaqa rock, "black rock", also spelled Yana Khakha) is a 3,944-metre-high (12,940 ft) mountain in the Bolivian Andes. It is located in the Potosí Department, Chayanta Province, Ravelo Municipality. It lies southwest of the village of Wari Pampa (Huari Pampa).
