= Jatun Urqu (Potosí) =

Mountain in the Bolivian Andes

- Location within Bolivia

Highest point
- Elevation: 2,629 m (8,625 ft)
- Coordinates: 18°36′52″S 65°31′04″W

Geography
- Location: Bolivia, Potosí Department
- Parent range: Andes

Jatun Urqu (Quechua jatun big, urqu mountain, "big mountain", also spelled Jatun Orkho) is a 2,629-metre-high (8,625 ft) mountain in the Bolivian Andes. It is located in the Potosí Department, Chayanta Province, Ravelo Municipality. It lies east of the Quri Mayu ("gold river").
