= Jatun Lluqhi =

Mountain in Bolivia

- Location within Bolivia

Highest point
- Elevation: 2,711 m (8,894 ft)
- Coordinates: 18°31′20″S 65°35′43″W

Geography
- Location: Bolivia, Potosí Department
- Parent range: Andes

Jatun Lluqhi (Quechua jatun big, lluqhi landslide, "big landslide", also spelled Jatun Lluqui) is a 2,711-metre-high (8,894 ft) mountain in the Bolivian Andes. It is located in the Potosí Department, Chayanta Province, Ravelo Municipality.
