= Siwinqani (Potosí) =

Mountain in Bolivia

- Location within Bolivia

Highest point
- Elevation: 4,202 m (13,786 ft)
- Coordinates: 18°44′12″S 65°44′29″W

Geography
- Location: Bolivia, Potosí Department
- Parent range: Andes

Siwinqani (Aymara siwinqa a kind of cactus, -ni a suffix, "the one with the siwinqa plant", also spelled Sevengani) is a 4,202-metre-high (13,786 ft) mountain in the Bolivian Andes. It is located in the Potosí Department, Chayanta Province, Ocurí Municipality. It lies northwest of Lluxita, northeast of the village of Ch'aki Mayu (Chaqui Mayu).
