= Ocurí Municipality =

- Municipality
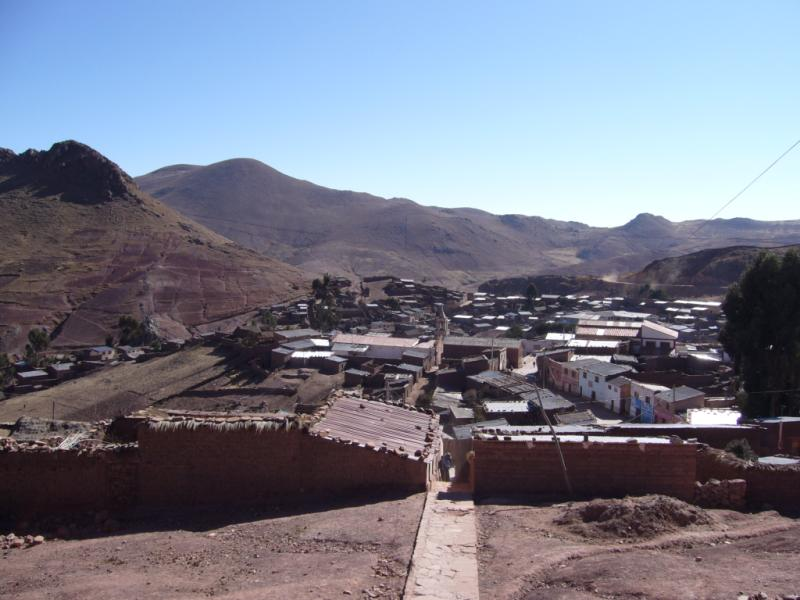
- Ocurí

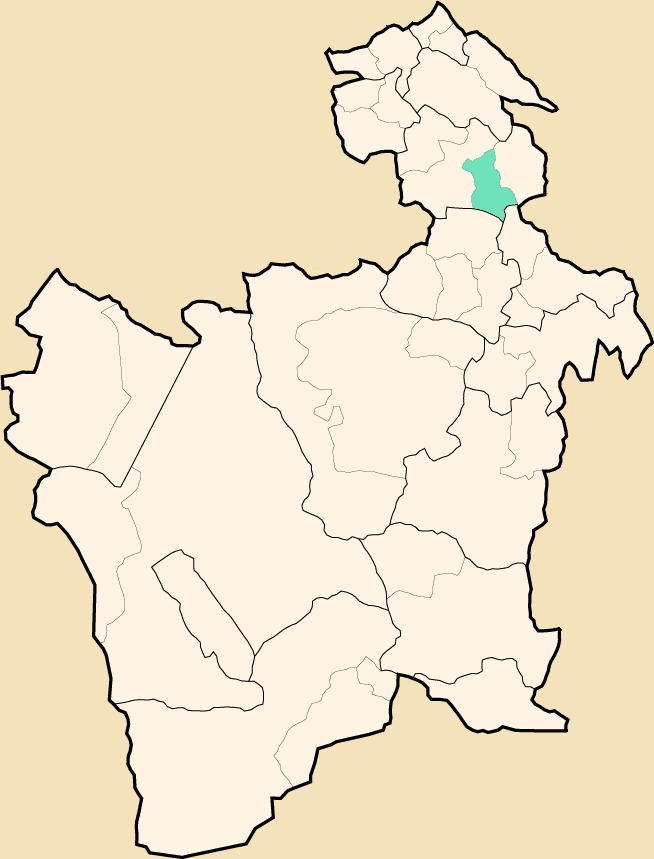
- Location within Potosí Department

- Location within Bolivia
- Coordinates: 18°50′S 65°48′W
- Country: Bolivia
- Department: Potosí Department
- Province: Chayanta Province
- Seat: Ocurí

Area
  - Total: 304 sq mi (788 km^{2})
- Elevation: 13,500 ft (4,100 m)

Population (2001)
  - Total: 18,516
  - Ethnicities: Quechua
- Time zone: UTC-4 (BOT)

Ocurí Municipality is the fourth municipal section of the Chayanta Province in the Potosí Department in Bolivia. Its seat is Ocurí.

== Subdivision ==
The municipality consists of the following cantons:

- Chairapata
- Maragua
- Marcoma
- Ocurí

== The people ==
The people are predominantly indigenous citizens of Quechua descent.

Ethnic group	%
Quechua	93.4
Aymara	0.2
Guaraní, Chiquitos, Moxos	0.2
Not indigenous	6.1
Other indigenous groups	0.1

== Notable people ==
- Emeliana Aiza (born 1980) - politician

== See also ==
- Lluxita
- Siwinqani
