= Quchayuq (Oropeza) =

Mountain in Bolivia

- Location within Bolivia

Highest point
- Elevation: 3,408 m (11,181 ft)
- Coordinates: 18°35′06″S 65°27′01″W

Geography
- Location: Bolivia, Chuquisaca Department
- Parent range: Andes

Quchayuq (Quechua qucha lake, -yuq a suffix, "the one with a lake (or lakes)", also spelled Khochayoj) is a 3,408-metre-high (11,181 ft) mountain in the Bolivian Andes. It is located in the Chuquisaca Department, Oropeza Province, Poroma Municipality, southwest of the village of Poroma.
