= Chullpa Urqu (Potosí) =

Mountain in Bolivia

- Location within Bolivia

Highest point
- Elevation: 3,132 m (10,276 ft)
- Coordinates: 18°32′16″S 65°33′03″W

Geography
- Location: Bolivia, Potosí Department
- Parent range: Andes

Chullpa Urqu (Quechua chullpa stone tomb, burial tower, urqu mountain, "chullpa mountain", also spelled Chullpa Orkho) is a 3,132-metre-high (10,276 ft) mountain in the Bolivian Andes. It is located in the Potosí Department, Chayanta Province, Ravelo Municipality. It lies northwest of Markawi.
