= Ravelo =

Ravelo is a surname and given name of Spanish origin, originating as a habitational surname. Notable people with the surname or given name include:

== Surname ==
- Ana Ravelo, American paleoceanographer
- Antonio Ravelo (1940-2014), Venezuelan footballer
- Blas García Ravelo, Spanish sculptor
- Eduardo Ravelo (born 1968), Mexican-American gangster
- Jerson Ravelo (born 1977), Dominican boxer
- Mars Ravelo (1916-1988), Filipino comic book artist and graphic novelist
- Rangel Ravelo (born 1992), Cuban professional baseball first baseman and outfielder
- Yangel Herrera (born 1998), full name Yangel Clemente Herrera Ravelo, Venezuelan professional footballer

== Given name ==
- Ravelo Manzanillo (born 1963), Dominican former pitcher

== See also ==
- Ravelo Municipality, a municipality in Potosí Department, Bolivia
