= Chullpa Urqu =

Mountain in Bolivia

- Location within Bolivia

Highest point
- Elevation: 3,540 m (11,610 ft)
- Coordinates: 19°10′49″S 65°22′00″W

Geography
- Location: Bolivia, Chuquisaca Department
- Parent range: Andes

Chullpa Urqu (Quechua chullpa stone tomb, burial tower, urqu mountain, "chullpa mountain", also spelled Chullpa Orkho) is a mountain in the Bolivian Andes which reaches a height of approximately 3,540 m (11,610 ft). It is located in the Chuquisaca Department, Oropeza Province, Yotala Municipality.
