= Apachita (Chayanta) =

Mountain in Bolivia

- Location within Bolivia

Highest point
- Elevation: 4,061 m (13,323 ft)
- Coordinates: 18°46′10″S 65°39′46″W

Geography
- Location: Bolivia, Potosí Department
- Parent range: Andes

Apachita (Aymara: the place of transit of an important pass in the principal routes of the Andes via a stone cairn(a little pile of rocks built along the trail in the high mountains); also spelled Apacheta) is a 4,061-metre-high (13,323 ft) mountain in the Bolivian Andes. It is located in the Potosí Department, Chayanta Province, Ravelo Municipality. It lies northeast of the village of Wari Pampa (Huari Pampa).
