= Lluxita (Potosí) =

Mountain in Bolivia

- Location within Bolivia

Highest point
- Elevation: 4,100 m (13,500 ft)
- Coordinates: 18°45′28″S 65°43′18″W

Geography
- Location: Bolivia, Potosí Department
- Parent range: Andes

Lluxita (Aymara lluxi shell of a mussel; landslide, -ta a suffix, also spelled Llojeta) is a mountain in the Bolivian Andes which reaches a height of approximately 4,100 m (13,500 ft). It is located in the Potosí Department, Chayanta Province, Ocurí Municipality. It lies southeast of the village of Ch'aki Mayu (Chaqui Mayu).
