= Ch'aki Mayu (Chuquisaca) =

Mountain in Bolivia

- Location within Bolivia

Highest point
- Elevation: 3,654 m (11,988 ft)
- Coordinates: 19°04′27″S 65°22′26″W

Geography
- Location: Bolivia, Chuquisaca Department
- Parent range: Andes

Ch'aki Mayu (Quechua ch'aki dry, mayu river, "dry river", also spelled Chaqui Mayu) is a 3,654-metre-high (11,988 ft) mountain in the Bolivian Andes. It is located in the Chuquisaca Department, Oropeza Province, Sucre Municipality.
