= Oropeza Province =

- Province
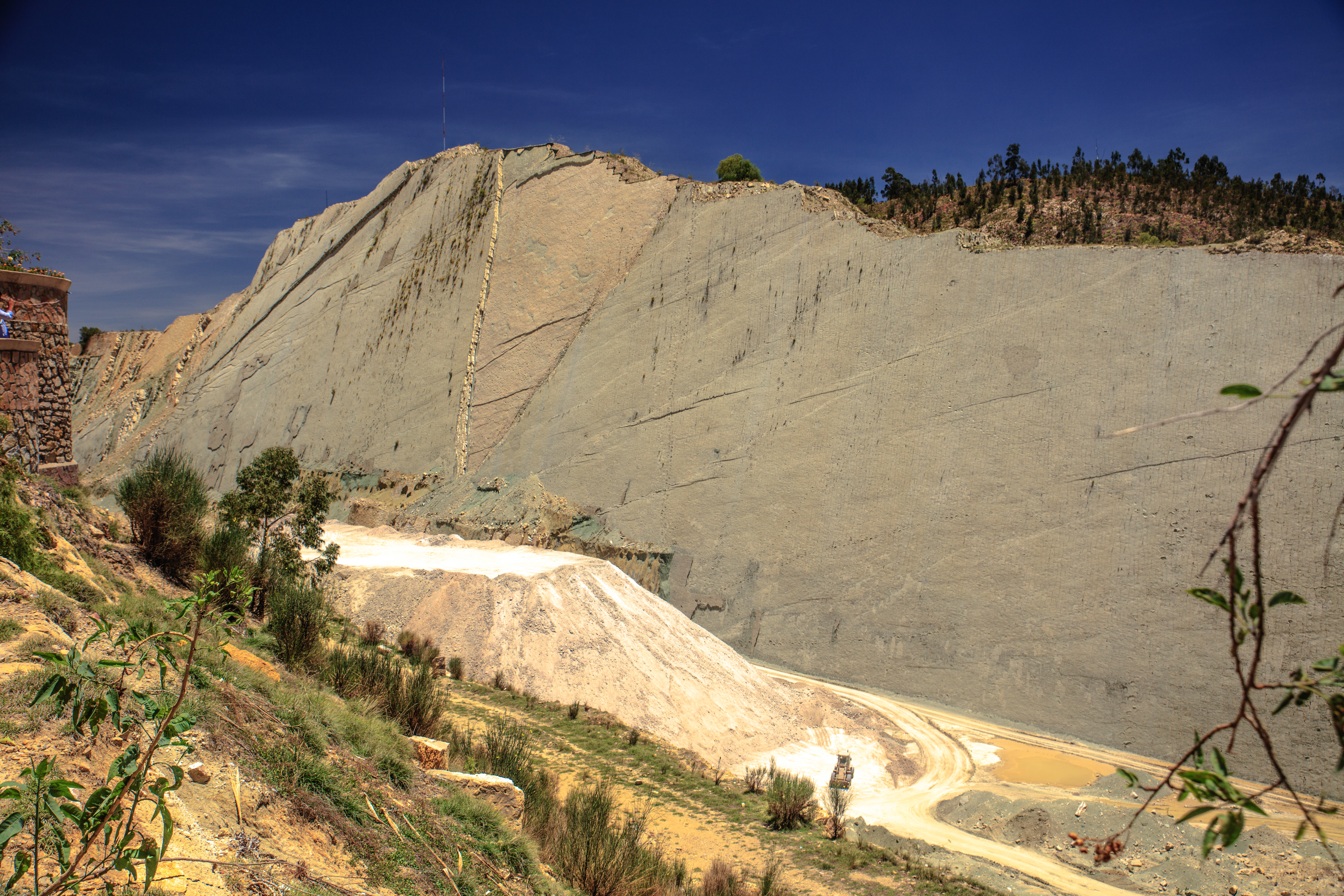
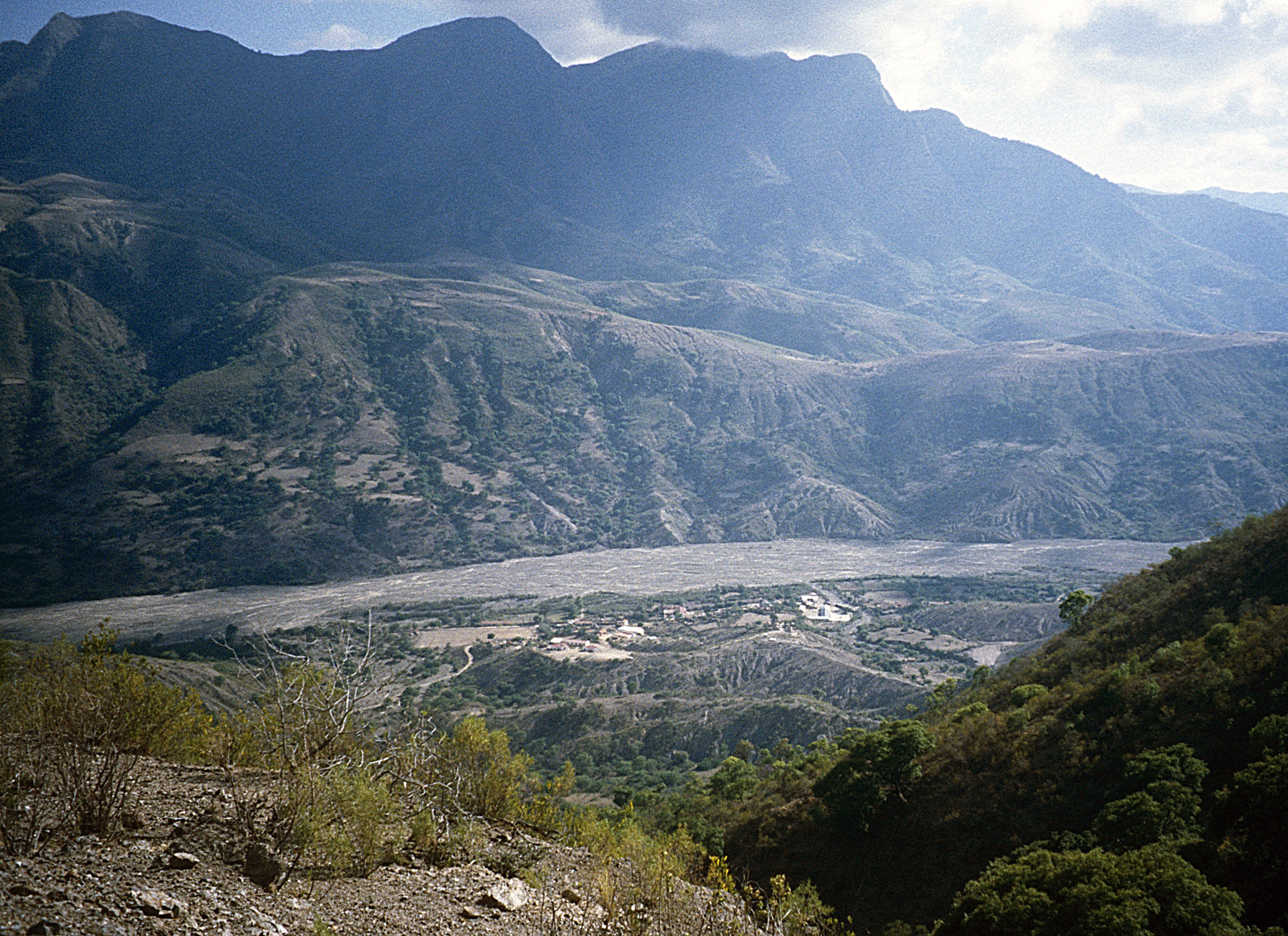
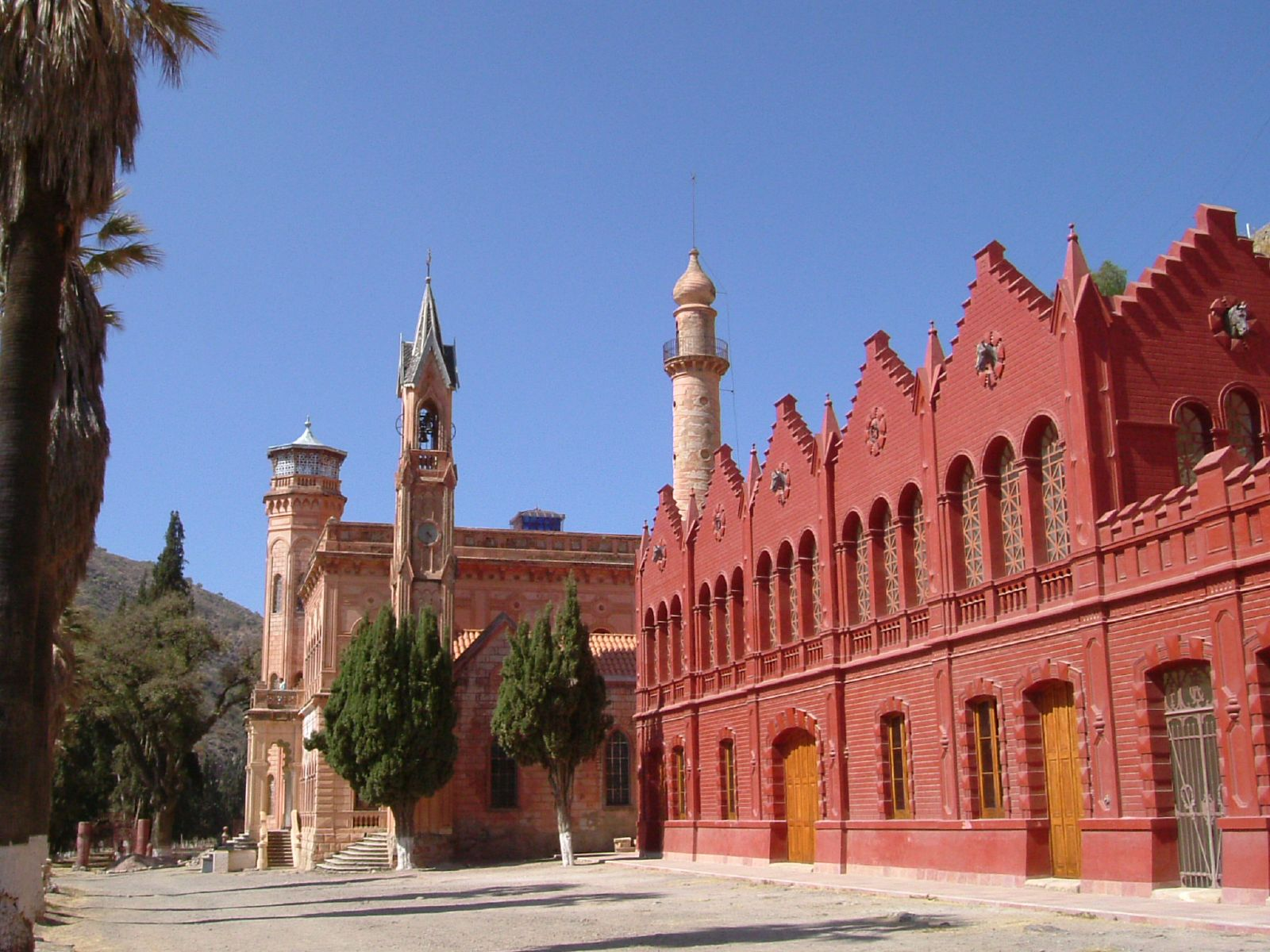
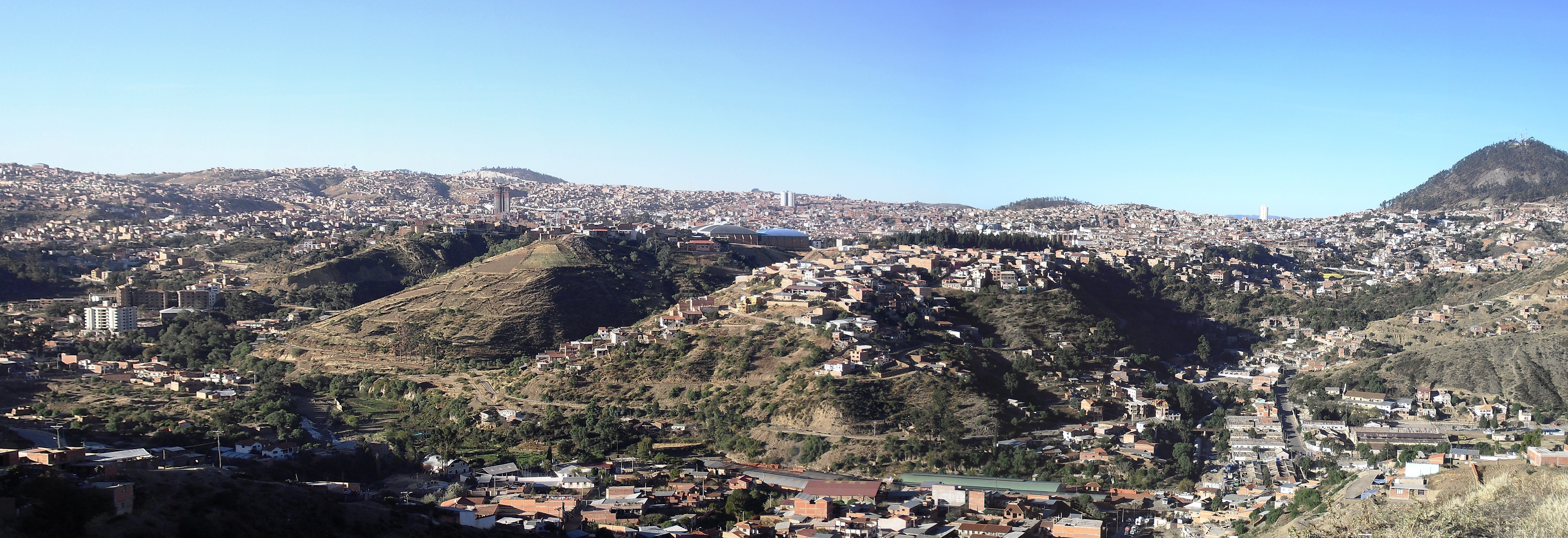
- Sucre, the constitutional capital of Bolivia and the capital of the Oropeza Province

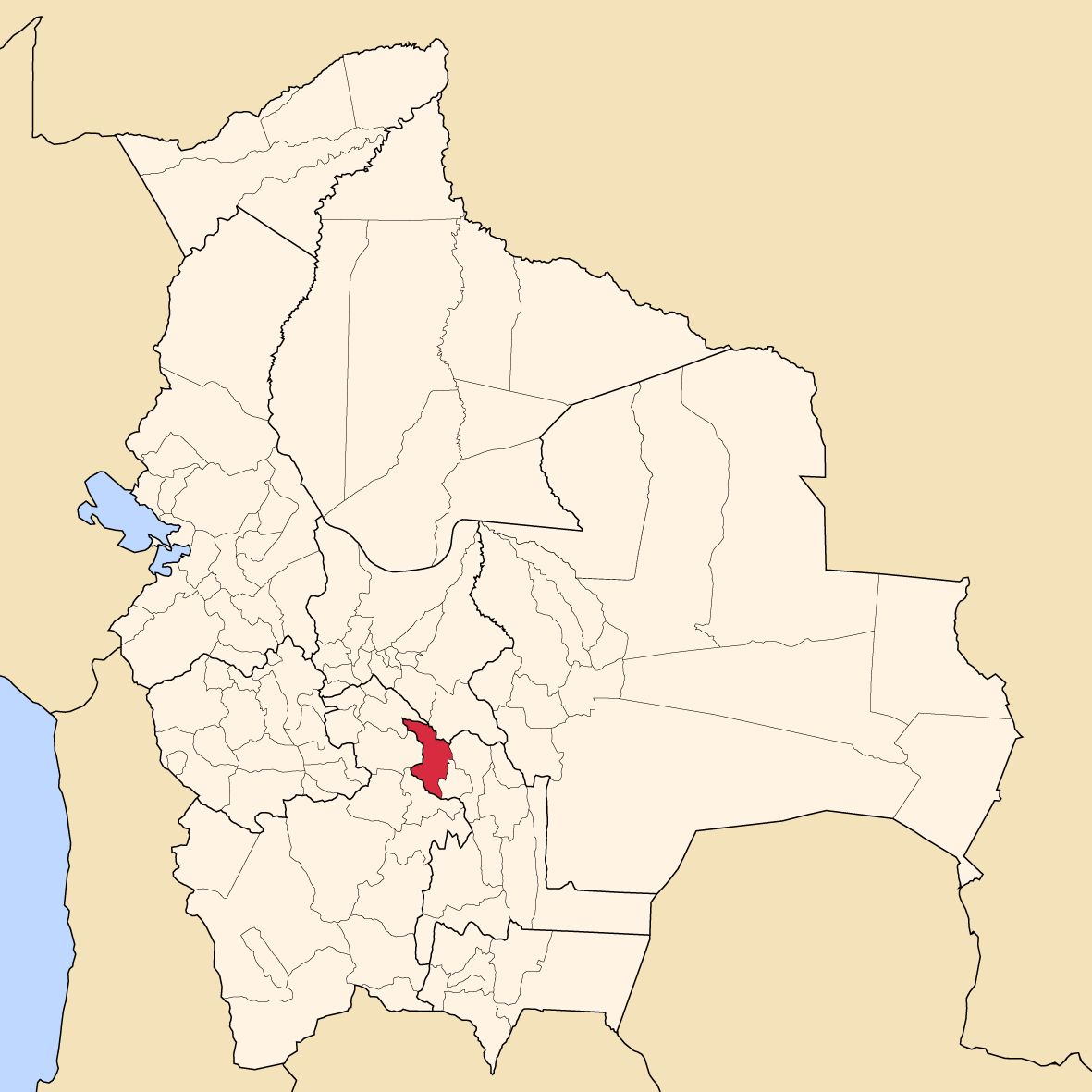
- Location of Oropeza Province within Bolivia
- Coordinates: 18°50′S 65°15′W
- Country: Bolivia
- Department: Chuquisaca Department
- Capital: Sucre

Area
  - Total: 1,416 sq mi (3,667 km^{2})
- Elevation: 6,600 ft (2,000 m)

Population (2024 census)
  - Total: 319,006
  - Density: 225.3/sq mi (86.99/km^{2})
  - Ethnicities: Quechuas
- Time zone: UTC-4 (BOT)

Oropeza is a province in the Chuquisaca Department, Bolivia. Its seat is Sucre which is also the constitutional capital of Bolivia and the capital of the Chuquisaca Department.

== Geography ==
Some of the highest mountains of the province are listed below:

- Alisu Punta
- Asna Kancha
- Chawayasqa
- Chullpa Urqu
- Chullpani
- Ch'aki Mayu
- Ch'usiqani
- Illimani
- Inti Rumi
- Jatun Pampa
- Jatun Q'asa
- Jatun Urqu
- Juch'uy Satari
- Katariri
- Kimsa Muqu
- Kimsa Ñuñu
- Kimsa T'ipa
- Misk'a Urqu
- Mulli Punta
- Mulli Urqu
- Parya Punta
- Pukara
- P'aqla Urqu
- Quchayuq
- Satari
- Tawayuq
- Tuqtu Q'asa
- Wallpa Q'asa
- Wayra Pata
- Wayrani Wayu
- Wichhu Qullu
- Wiru Wiru

== Subdivision ==
The province is divided into three municipalities which are further subdivided into cantons.

Section	Municipality	Inhabitants (2001)	Seat	Inhabitants (2001)
Capital Municipality	Sucre Municipality	214,913	Sucre	193,876
1st	Yotala Municipality	9,497	Yotala	1,538
2nd	Poroma Municipality	16,966	Poroma	486

== The people ==
The people are predominantly indigenous citizens of Quechuan descent.

Ethnic group	Sucre Municipality (%)	Yotala Municipality (%)	Poroma Municipality (%)
Quechua	57.3	90.4	94.7
Aymara	2.3	0.8	0.9
Guaraní, Chiquitos, Moxos	1.4	0.2	0.1
Not indigenous	38.6	8.3	4.2
Other indigenous groups	0.4	0.3	0.1

Ref.: obd.descentralizacion.gov.bo

== Languages ==
The languages spoken in the province are mainly Spanish and Quechua.

Language	Sucre Municipality	Yotala Municipality	Poroma Municipality
Quechua	116,053	8,197	15,554
Aymara	3,322	68	165
Guaraní	344	8	4
Another native	67	0	4
Spanish	183,231	5,587	4,620
Foreign	8,156	41	8
Only native	19,901	3,319	11,057
Native and Spanish	97,831	4,916	4,513
Only Spanish	85,497	673	107

Ref.: obd.descentralizacion.gov.bo

== Places of interest ==
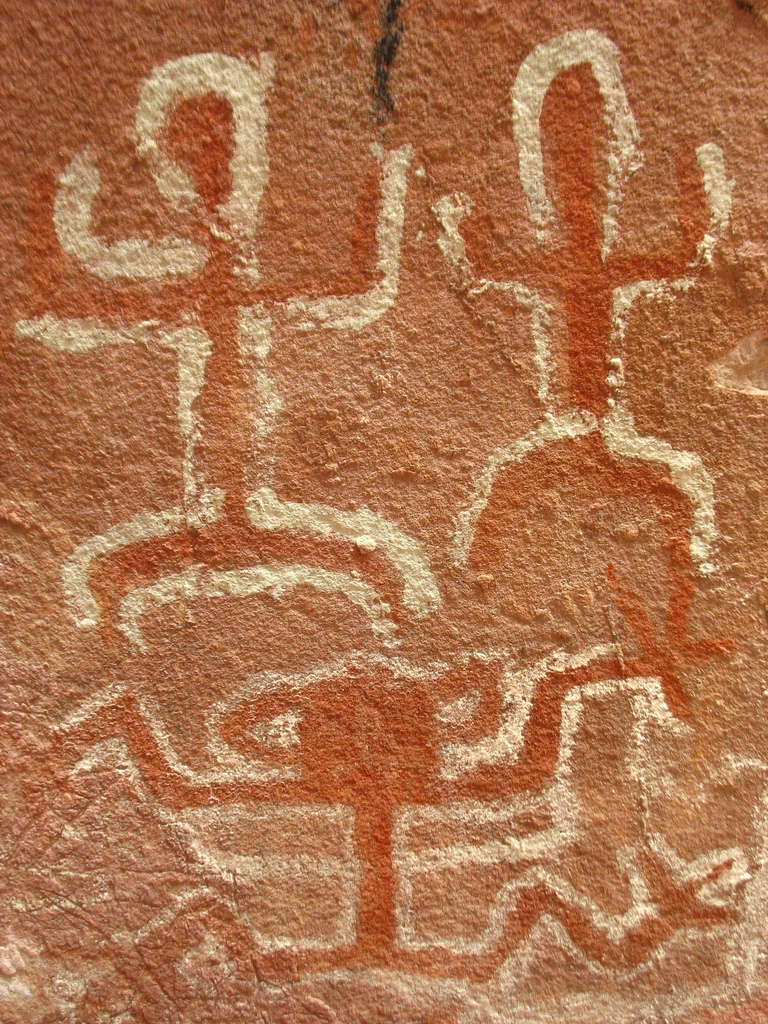
Cave paintings at Inka Mach'ay

The archaeological sites of Inka Mach'ay and Puma Mach'ay are situated within the province. Inka Mach'ay was declared a National Monument in 1958.

== See also ==
- Chullqi Mayu
- Inti Rumi
- Jatun Q'asa
