= Tomás Katari =

Quechua chief

- Died: January 15, 1781
- Known for: Leader of a peasant uprising in Upper Peru

Tomás Katari or Catari (died January 15, 1781) was an Aymara peasant and cacique of northern Potosí who led a popular uprising in Upper Peru (present-day Bolivia) in the late 18th century.

== Conditions before the rebellion ==
During the 1770s, the economic and political stability of the Macha community in Upper Peru was continuously disrupted. In 1772, the alcabala (sales tax) was increased from 2 percent to 4 percent. Then in 1774, aduanas (customhouses) were established and the acabala was applied to grain. The acabala was again increased in 1776 to 6 percent, the same year Upper Peru became part of the new Viceroyalty of the Rio de la Plata. Provincial officials began appointing outsider wealthy and/or mestizo caciques to indigenous townships, violating traditional practices of hereditary local cacique governance beneath Spanish rule. By the end of the decade, relations between the Indian communities and appointees of Spanish colonial officials saw increasing strain.

Joaquín Alós purchased the position of regional corregidor and began his tenure in early 1778 by seizing the legal documentation and order of dismissal Macha commoners possessed against the wealthy appointed mestizo cacique, Blas Bernal. Alós proceeded to arrest Tomás Katari, an illiterate Macha commoner who had sought Bernal's removal in the court of Charcas. He instructed Bernal to whip Katari in the public square, warning that further legal appeals to the regional courts would merit severe punishment.

== Journey to Buenos Aires ==
In 1778, Tomás Katari, alongside fellow peasant Tomás Acho, traveled from Macha by foot over 1000 miles to Buenos Aires, center of the new viceroyal administrative court. The magistrate, headed by reformist Viceroy Juan José de Vértiz, heard Katari's case upon his arrival in 1779 against both Bernal and Alós. The Viceroyalty sent Katari back with a ruling that named him to the function of collecting tribute from Macha until a Charcas-designated judge could investigate the manner further, whereupon Bernal and Alós would be removed from power and Katari named the official cacique of Macha. Katari as petitioner was protected by the court's ruling against further harms incited by local officials.

== Arrests and subsequent unrest ==
Upon return to the Chayanta province in 1779, Katari was swiftly arrested by Alós. After 8 months in prison in Potosí, not long after being freed, Katari marched with a group of supporters to Chuquisaca to denounce Alós once more. On June 10, 1780, Katari was arrested outside the courthouse, where he had resolved to stay until the audiencia addressed his case. While imprisoned, members of the Macha community showed up on various occasions in Chuquisaca calling for Katari's liberation whilst coordinating a relative take-over of the Chayanta province. Prosecuting all officials that were involved in Katari's repression, Macha peoples executed cacique Bernal, elected local leaders to replace the old and complicit, and established territorial checkpoints at the edge of the province.

During this time, Alós was ambushed by local Indians, whereupon he pledged to release Katari imminently and decrease the forced sale of goods. When, on August 26, Alós did not return with Katari and instead with a large militia to Pocoata, locals overwhelmed the militia and captured Alós, only freeing him on the condition that the Charcas court release Katari and remove Alós from the province.

== The Katari uprising and death ==
On September 1, 1780, Katari returned to Macha with the official judicial act from the audiencia that named him cacique, and that removed Alós from office. Before his release and expulsion on September 3, Alós was forced to write a letter demanding the official promulgation of the reduced forced sale of goods.

Macha became the center of uprising as provincial communities, viewing them as not representative of their class, deposed of caciques, hereditary and appointed alike, and brought them to Katari to determine their proper course of justice. Preparations were made to store supplies of food and weapons as rebellion spread across and outside Chayanta to Paria and beyond. Katari continued to deliver regional tribute obligations to the royal government.

Katari was captured in November 1780 by a Hispanic militia headed by Manuel Álvarez Villarroel and imprisoned in Aullagas. By January, the new corregidor, Juan Antonio de Acuña, deemed it necessary to move Katari to Chuquisaca. Katari was killed when, as an indigenous crowd confronted the militia on its journey, Acuña pushed him off a cliff. Acuña was subsequently stoned, his eyes pierced, and his body left unburied. Katari's body was brought to vigil, whereupon chicha and ritual honored him before his Christian burial in Quilaquila.

== Influence and legacy ==
After Tomás Katari's death, his cousins Nicolás and Dámaso Katari then took over leadership, expanding the rebellion to other communities in Upper Peru, and expressing desire to link with Tupac Amaru II’s uprising. The rebels targeted Spanish and creoles, regardless of individual affiliations. Damaso and Nicolas were gruesomely executed in La Plata and the cause was then taken up by Julián Apasa, under the name of Túpac Katari.

It has been argued that the violence that followed Katari's imprisonment and death demonstrates some of the limitations of Katari's power. That Katari purported an ideology of non-violence, however, is unsubstantiated. It is clear that Tomás Katari, as a peasant, staged a significant political and administrative challenge to Spanish rule and facilitated a regional movement that temporarily brought new indigenous peasant authorities to power.

It has been argued that due to his initial more institutional methods of resistance, Katari's image has not been used as that of Tupac Amaru by Indian or Latin American nationalist movements.

== See also ==
- Túpac Amaru II
- Túpac Katari
- Bourbon Reforms
- History of Bolivia
