= Colquechaca Municipality =

Colquechaca Qullqichaka
- Municipality
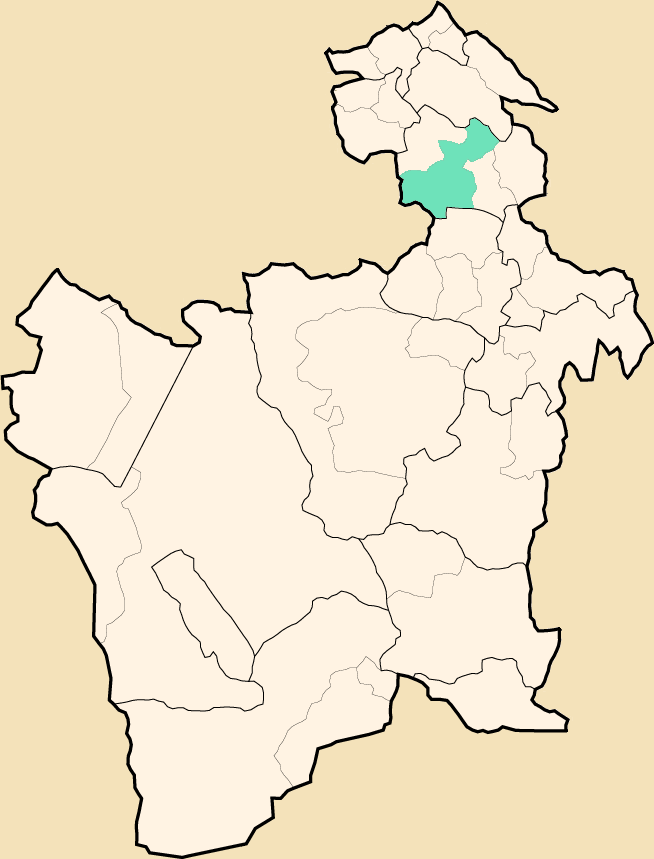
- Location within Potosí Department

- Location within Bolivia
- Coordinates: 18°53′S 66°5′W
- Country: Bolivia
- Department: Potosí Department
- Province: Chayanta Province
- Seat: Colquechaca

Area
  - Total: 713 sq mi (1,846 km^{2})
- Elevation: 13,000 ft (4,000 m)

Population (2001)
  - Total: 31,037
  - Ethnicities: Quechua
- Time zone: UTC-4 (BOT)

Colquechaca (in hispanicized spelling) or Qullqichaka (Quechua qullqi silver, money, chaka bridge, "silver bridge") is the first municipal section of the Chayanta Province in the Potosí Department in Bolivia. Its seat is Colquechaca.

== Subdivision ==
The municipality consists of the following cantons:

- Ayoma
- Colquechaca
- Macha
- Rosario
- Surumi

== The people ==
The people are predominantly indigenous citizens of Quechua descent.

Ethnic group	%
Quechua	95.3
Aymara	0.9
Guaraní, Chiquitos, Moxos	0.0
Not indigenous	3.8
Other indigenous groups	0.0
