= Sergio Serulnikov =

Argentine academic (born 1961)

- Born: 9 May 1961 (age 65)
- Scientific career
- Fields: History of Latin America

Sergio Serulnikov (born 9 May 1961) is an Argentine historian who currently works at the University of San Andrés. He focuses on Latin American revolutionary history, which has included books on the history of the rebellion of Túpac Amaru II.

Serulnikov's 2003 book Subverting Colonial Authority: Challenges to Spanish Rule in Eighteenth-Century Southern Andes was described as "well worth reading, although some aspects were disappointing" by Robert Jackson in History: Review of New Books. The same work was described by Sinclair Thomson in the The Historian as "one of the finest and most important works ever written on the Andean insurrection". Erick D. Langer reviewed the book in Journal of Social History, where he gave it similarly adulatory remarks: "specialists will find this book a very useful, indeed essential, addition to the literature". However, Langer also noted that "the book is very poorly copyedited, with many typos and stylistic infelicities".
