= Chayanta Province =

Chayanta
- Province
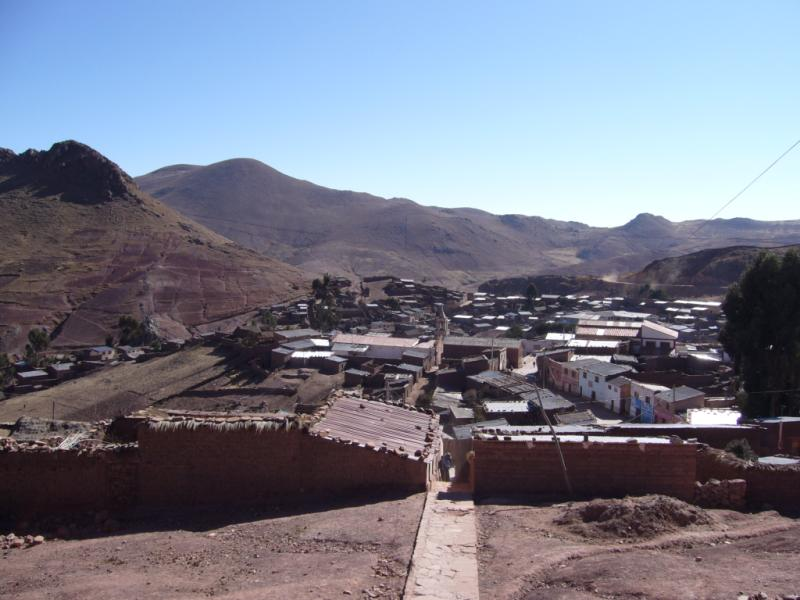
- Ocurí, the seat of the Ocurí Municipality

- Flag Seal

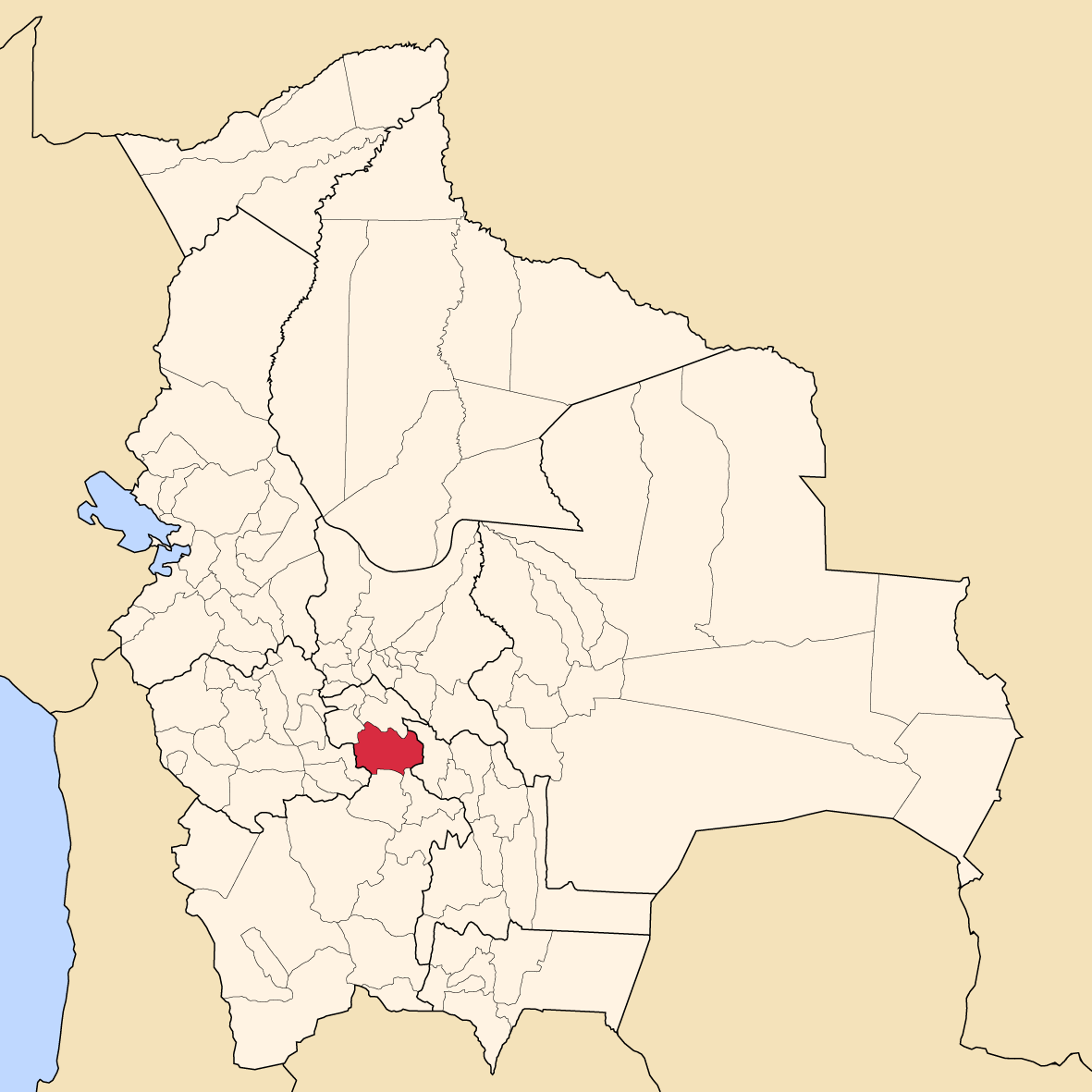
- Location of the Chayanta Province within Bolivia

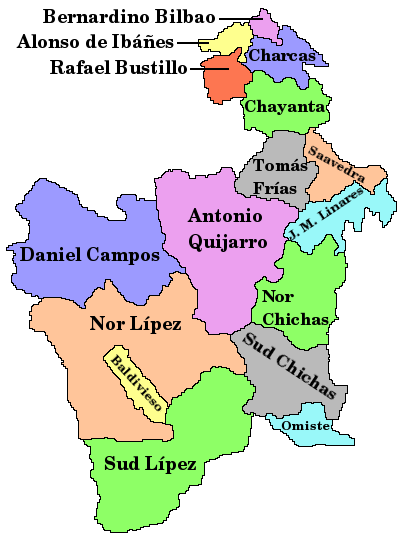
- Provinces of the Potosí Department
- Coordinates: 18°44′S 65°51′W
- Country: Bolivia
- Department: Potosí Department
- Municipalities: 4
- Cantons: 13
- Capital: Colquechaca

Area
  - Total: 1,919 sq mi (4,969 km^{2})

Population (2024 census)
  - Total: 100,498
  - Density: 52.38/sq mi (20.22/km^{2})
  - Ethnicities: Quechua
- Time zone: UTC-4 (BOT)
- Area code: BO.PO.CY

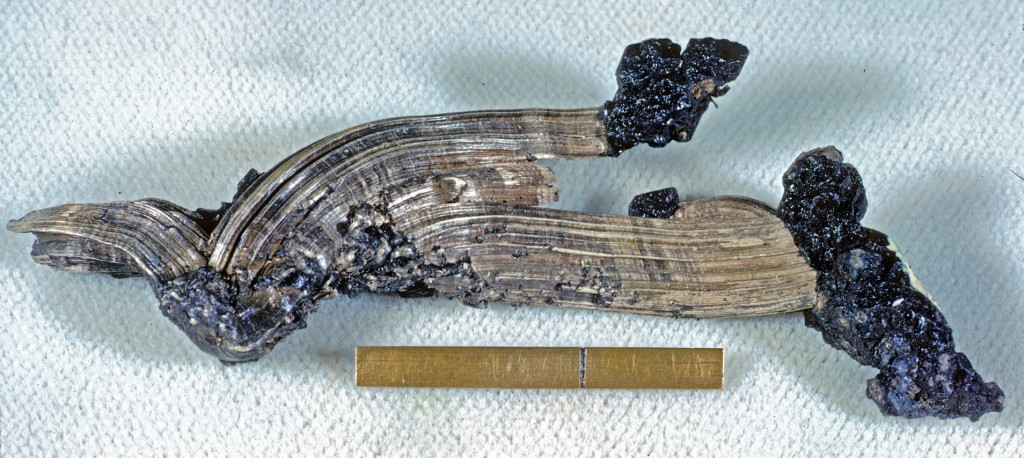
Silver and acanthite, from Colquechaca (Aullagas), Chayanta Province, Bolivia. Scale at bottom is one inch, with a rule at one cm.

Chayanta is a province in the northern parts of the Bolivian Potosí Department. Its capital is Colquechaca.

== Location ==
Chayanta province is one of sixteen provinces in the Potosí Department. It is located between 18° 23' and 19° 6' South and between 65° 23' and 66° 19' West.

It borders Charcas Province in the north, Rafael Bustillo Province in the northwest, Oruro Department in the west, Tomás Frías Province in the south, Cornelio Saavedra Province in the southeast, and Chuquisaca Department in the east. The province extends over 125 km from east to west and 100 km from north to south.

== Geography ==
Some of the highest mountains of the province are listed below:

- Apachita
- Chullpa Q'asa
- Chullpa Urqu
- Ch'iyar Jaqhi
- Jatun Lluqhi
- Jatun Punta
- Jatun Urqu
- Katariri
- Kuntur Puñuna
- Kuntur Qaqa
- Lluxita
- Markawi
- Muyu Urqu
- Palta Urqu
- Pastu Urqu
- Pata Urqu
- Puka Q'asa
- Puka Urqu
- Q'illu Qaqa
- Q'illu Wasi
- Sankayu
- Sikuyayuq
- Siwinqani
- Tullu Muqu
- Ura Urqu
- Urqu Pata
- Wathiya Punta
- Wayra Wasi
- Wichhu Qullu
- Wila Jaqhi
- Wisk'achani
- Wisk'achani Punta
- Yana Qaqa
- Yana Urqu
- Yuraq Urqu

== History ==
In the late eighteenth century the province was the scene of a rebellion of the Aymara-speaking population led by Tomás Katari and exacerbated by his assassination in January 1781. It was also the scene of a peasant rebellion in 1927.

== Division ==
The province comprises four municipalities, which are partly further subdivided into cantons.

Section	Municipality	Seat
1st	Colquechaca Municipality	Colquechaca
2nd	Ravelo Municipality	Ravelo
3rd	Pocoata Municipality	Pocoata
4th	Ocurí Municipality	Ocurí

== Population ==
The main language of the province is Quechua, spoken by 79%, while 33% of the population speaks Spanish. The population increased from 73,128 inhabitants (1992 census) to 90,205 (2001 census), an increase of 23.4%. The capital of the province is Colquechaca.

97% of the population have no access to electricity, 98% have no sanitary facilities.

74% of the population are employed in agriculture, 1% in mining, 13% in industry, 12% in general services. 93% of the population are Catholics, 5% Protestants.

The people are predominantly indigenous citizens of Quechua descent.

Ethnic group	Colquechaca Municipality (%)	Ravelo Municipality (%)	Pocoata Municipality (%)	Ocurí Municipality (%)
Quechua	95.3	94.4	89.6	93.4
Aymara	0.9	0.3	3.0	0.2
Guaraní, Chiquitos, Moxos	0.0	0.1	0.0	0.2
Not indigenous	3.8	5.2	7.3	6.1
Other indigenous groups	0.0	0.1	0.0	0.1

== Literature ==
- Sergio Serulnikov, Subverting Colonial Authority: Challenges to Spanish Rule in Eighteenth-Century Southern Andes (Durham: Duke University Press, 2003)
- Sergio Serulnikov, Tomás Catari y la producción de justicia (Buenos Aires: CEDES, 1988)
- Erick D. Langer, "Andean Rituals of Revolt: The Chayanta Rebellion of 1927," Ethnohistory 37(1990): 227–53
- Tristan Platt, Estado boliviano y ayllu andino: tierra y tributo en el norte de Potosi (Lima: Instituto de Estudios Peruanos, 1982)

== See also ==
- Q'ara Quta
