= Ravelo Municipality =

- Municipality
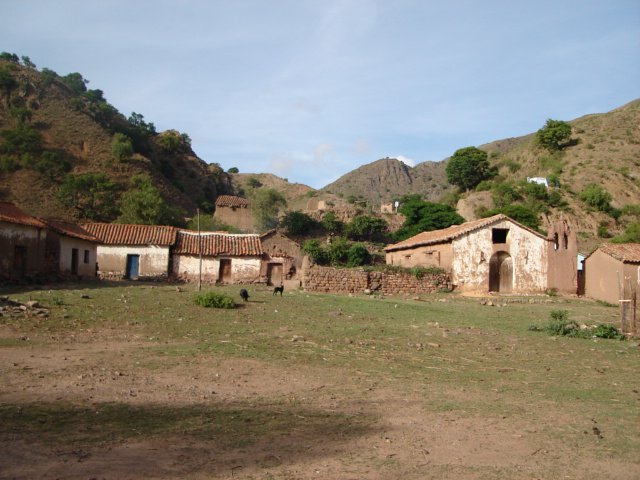
- The small village of Toroca in the Ravelo Municipality

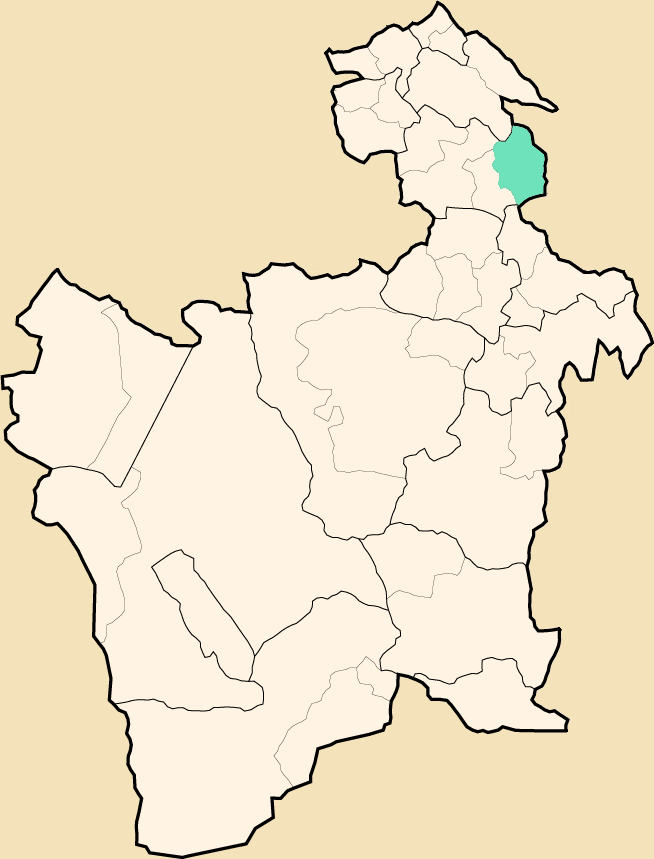
- Location within Potosí Department

- Location within Bolivia
- Coordinates: 18°47′S 65°33′W
- Country: Bolivia
- Department: Potosí Department
- Province: Chayanta Province
- Seat: Ravelo

Population (2001)
  - Total: 20,536
  - Ethnicities: Quechua
- Time zone: UTC-4 (BOT)

Ravelo Municipality is the second municipal section of the Chayanta Province in the Potosí Department in Bolivia. Its seat is Ravelo.

== Geography ==
Some of the highest mountains of the municipality are listed below:

- Apachita
- Chullpa Urqu
- Ch'iyar Jaqhi
- Jatun Lluqhi
- Jatun Urqu
- Katariri
- Kuntur Qaqa
- Markawi
- Palta Urqu
- Pata Urqu
- Puka Q'asa
- Puka Urqu
- Q'illu Wasi
- Sankayu
- Sikuyayuq
- Tullu Muqu
- Ura Urqu
- Urqu Pata
- Wathiya Punta
- Wayra Wasi
- Wichhu Qullu
- Wisk'achani
- Wisk'achani Punta
- Yana Qaqa
- Yana Urqu
- Yuraq Urqu

== Subdivision ==
The municipality consists of the following cantons:

- Antora
- Huaycoma
- Pitantora
- Ravelo
- Tomoyo
- Toroca

== The people ==
The people are predominantly indigenous citizens of Quechua descent.

Ethnic group	%
Quechua	94.4
Aymara	0.3
Guaraní, Chiquitos, Moxos	0.1
Not indigenous	5.2
Other indigenous groups	0.1

== Climate ==
Climate data for Ravelo, elevation 3,200 m (10,500 ft)
Month	Jan	Feb	Mar	Apr	May	Jun	Jul	Aug	Sep	Oct	Nov	Dec	Year
Mean daily maximum °C (°F)	19.9 (67.8)	19.6 (67.3)	19.5 (67.1)	20.1 (68.2)	20.4 (68.7)	19.8 (67.6)	19.7 (67.5)	20.6 (69.1)	21.1 (70.0)	21.6 (70.9)	21.7 (71.1)	21.0 (69.8)	20.4 (68.8)
Daily mean °C (°F)	13.6 (56.5)	13.4 (56.1)	13.1 (55.6)	12.6 (54.7)	10.9 (51.6)	9.4 (48.9)	9.3 (48.7)	11.2 (52.2)	12.5 (54.5)	13.8 (56.8)	14.1 (57.4)	14.0 (57.2)	12.3 (54.2)
Mean daily minimum °C (°F)	7.4 (45.3)	7.2 (45.0)	6.8 (44.2)	5.2 (41.4)	1.4 (34.5)	−1.1 (30.0)	−1.1 (30.0)	1.8 (35.2)	3.9 (39.0)	6.0 (42.8)	6.4 (43.5)	6.9 (44.4)	4.2 (39.6)
Average precipitation mm (inches)	196.0 (7.72)	175.9 (6.93)	132.1 (5.20)	33.8 (1.33)	5.4 (0.21)	2.8 (0.11)	3.7 (0.15)	8.6 (0.34)	23.5 (0.93)	55.2 (2.17)	86.8 (3.42)	174.6 (6.87)	898.4 (35.38)
Average precipitation days	14.5	11.8	9.7	3.1	0.8	0.3	0.6	1.3	2.6	5.2	7.4	12	69.3
Average relative humidity (%)	83.3	83.7	84.6	83.1	78.2	72.9	73.8	75.7	76.5	76.1	78.8	80.1	78.9
Source: Servicio Nacional de Meteorología e Hidrología de Bolivia
