= Jesuit Missions of Moxos =

Catholic missions in Bolivia

The Jesuit Missions of Moxos are located in the Llanos de Moxos of Beni department in eastern Bolivia. Distinguished by a unique fusion of European and Amerindian cultural influences, the missions were founded as reductions or reducciones de indios by Jesuits in the 17th and 18th centuries to convert local tribes to Christianity.

== History ==
Jesuit priests arriving from Santa Cruz de la Sierra began evangelizing native peoples of the region in the 1670s. They set up a series of missions near the Mamoré River for this purpose beginning with Loreto. The principal mission was established at Trinidad in 1686.

In Moxos, books provided the Jesuits with information vital to the mission development.

== List of missions ==
Meireles (1989) lists the following Jesuit missions of Moxos along with their respective ethnic groups (tribes). Founding dates and a few more additional missions are from Block (1994).

Mission	Founding date	Location	Group
Loreto	1682	Ibare River, left bank	Mojo
Trinidad	1687	upper Mamoré River, right bank	Mojo
San Ignacio	1689	Tijamuchi River, right bank	Mojo, Rokorono
San Javier	1691	Mamoré River	Mojo
San Francisco de Borja	1693	Rápulo River source	Chimane, Rokorono, Mojo, Movima
San Pedro	1697	Machupo River source	Canichana
San Luis de Gonzaga	1698 (abandoned 1758)	Rápulo River	Rokorono, Mojo, Movima
Santos Reyes	1710	upper Beni River	Movima, Maropa
Exaltación	1709	lower Mamoré River	Cayubaba
Concepción de Baures	1708	upper Baures River	Baure, Chapacura, Kitemoka, Napeka
San Joaquín	1709	Baures River	Baure
Santa Ana	1719	Yacuma River	Movima
San Pablo	1703 (abandoned 1710)	upper Yacuma River	Movima
San Simón y Judás	1744	San Martín River source	Chapakura, Baure
San Nicolás	1740	San Martín River	Baure
Desposorios de Mojos	1723	Yapacaní River (Rio Grande tributary), near right bank	?
Carmen de Mojos	1794	middle Rio Blanco, left bank	Chapakura, Baure
San José	1691 (abandoned 1752)	Apere River, left bank	?
San Martín	1717	San Simón River/San Martín River confluence	Bauré
Santa Magdalena	1720	Machupo River	Itonama
San Miguel (1)	1696	Baures River	Moré, Baure
Santa Rosa (1)	1705 (abandoned 1740)	upper Mamoré River	
Santa Rosa (2)	1743 (abandoned 1751)	Guaporé River	Moré
San Simón	1746	Guaporé River	Moré, Aricoroni
San Miguel (2)	1725 (abandoned 1762)	Guapore River	Moré, Aricoroni
San Juan Bautista	1710 (abandoned 1718)	eastern savanna	
Patrocinio	1730 (abandoned 1741)	upper Mamoré River	

== Languages ==
The following indigenous languages, which make up much of the Mamoré-Guaporé linguistic area, were historically spoken in the missions. Moxo was the primary lingua franca (Spanish: lengua general) used in the missions.

- Arawakan languages
  - Moxo, spoken by the Mojeños
  - Baure, spoken by the Baure people
- Canichana, spoken by the Canichana people
- Movima, spoken by the Movima people
- Cayuvava, spoken by the Cayuvava people
- Itonama, spoken by the Itonama people
- Tsimané, spoken by the Tsimané people
- Mure (extinct)
- Chapacuran languages
  - Itene
  - Chapacura (extinct)
  - Napeca (extinct)
  - Rocorona (extinct)
  - Quitemo (extinct)
- Tacanan languages
  - Reyesano (or Maropa)

== Gallery ==
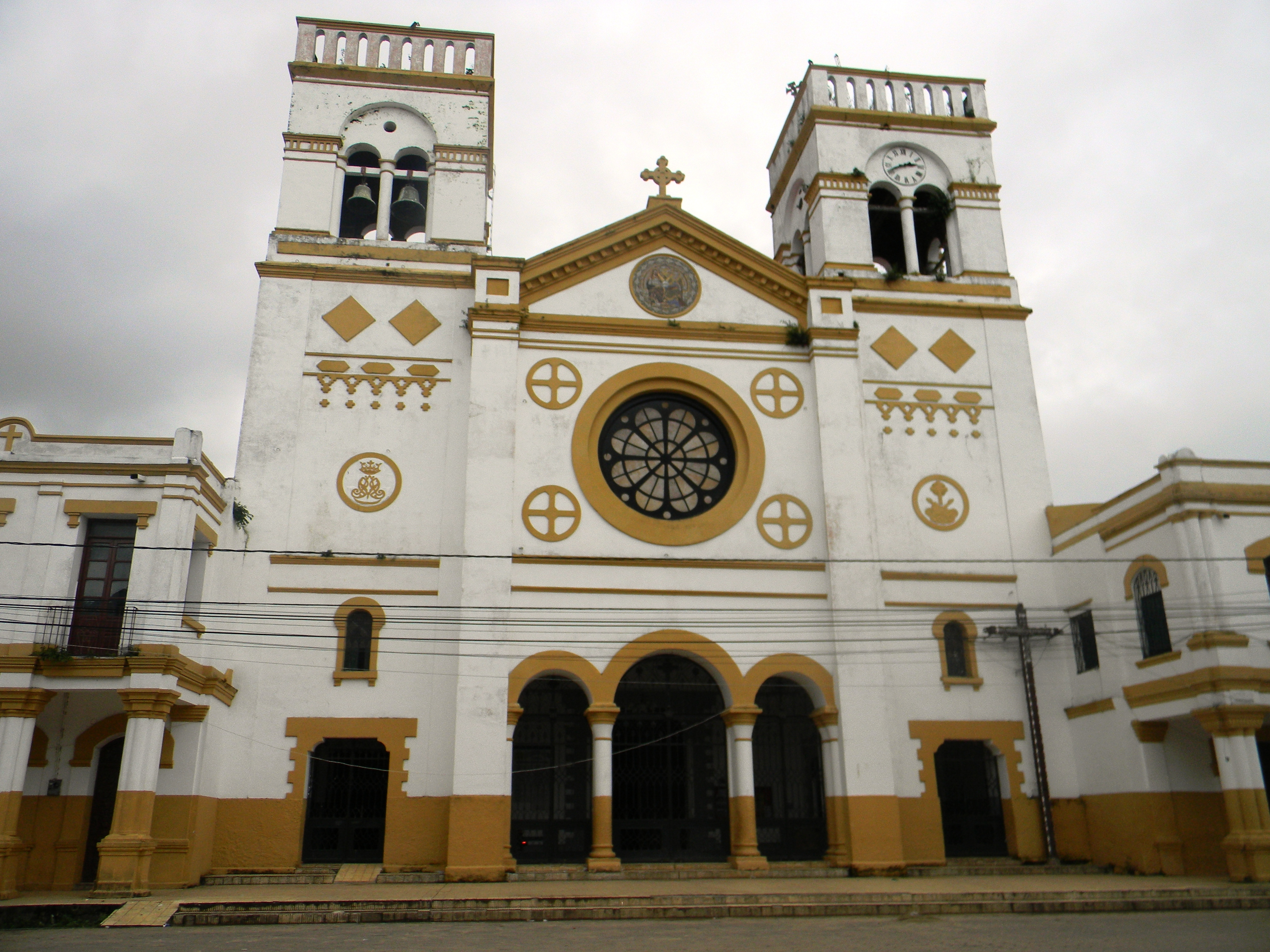
Trinidad Cathedral

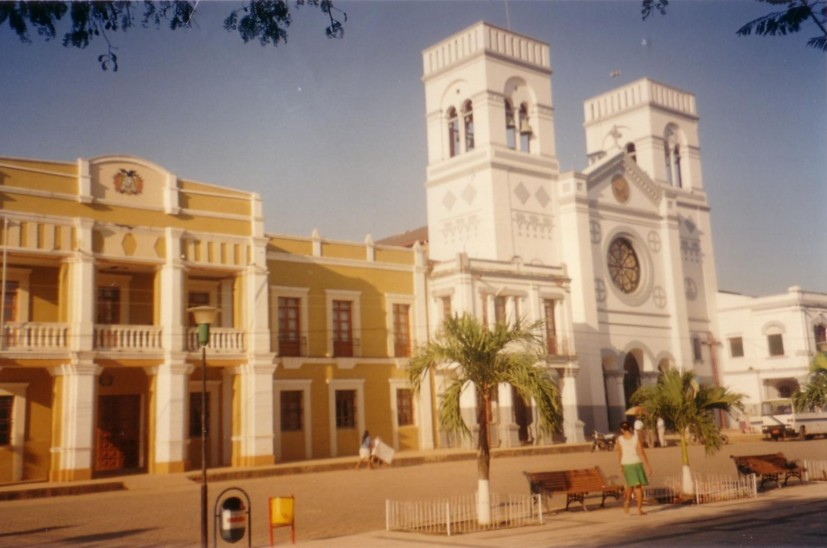
Trinidad Cathedral

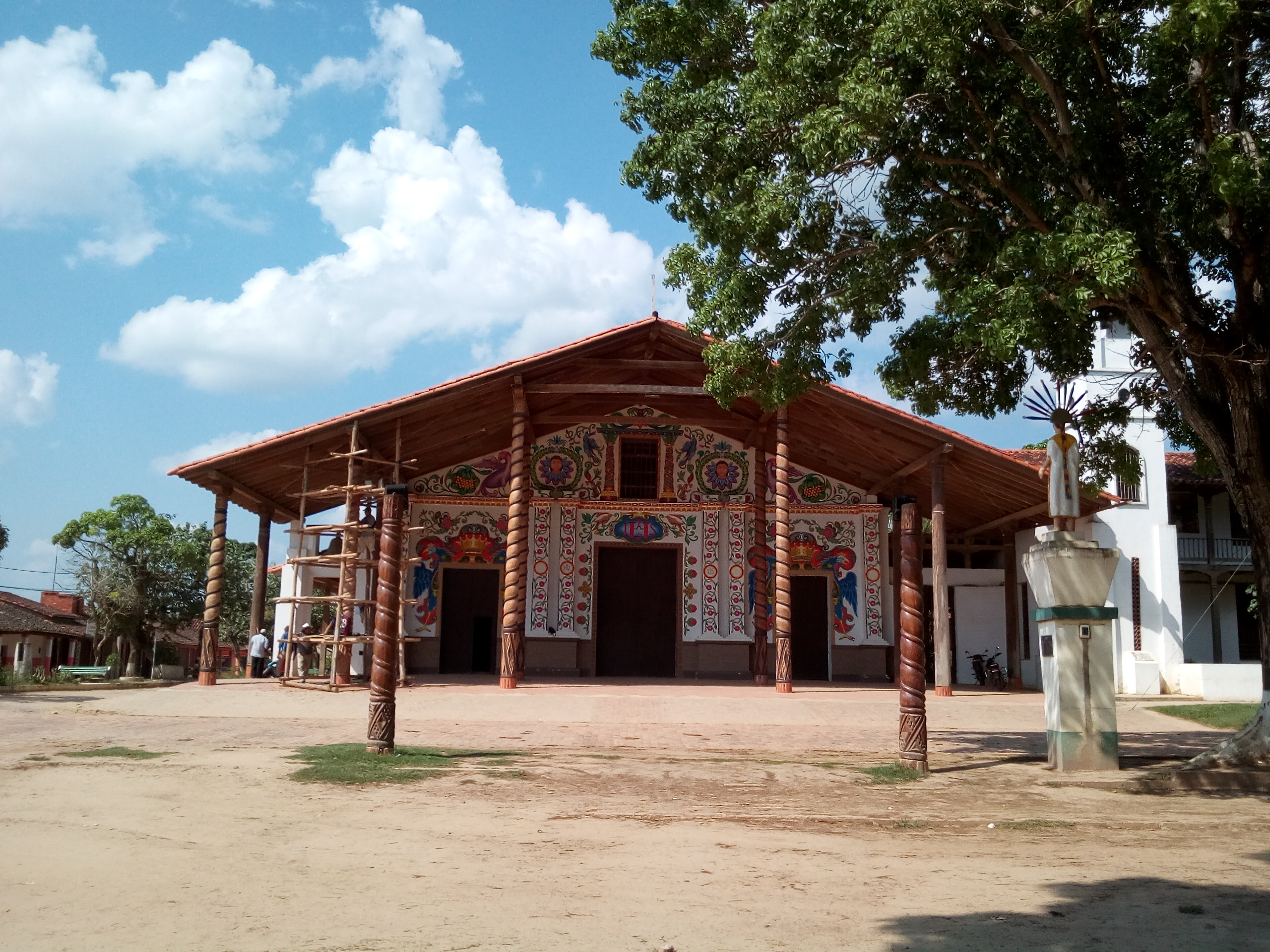
San Ignacio de Moxos

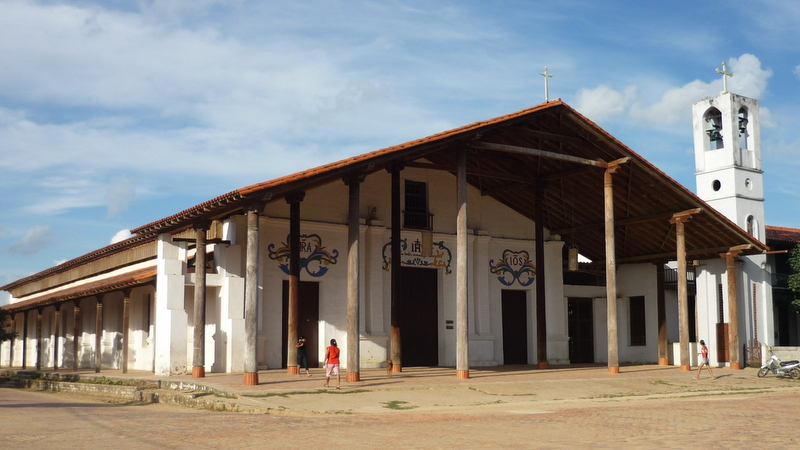
San Ignacio de Moxos

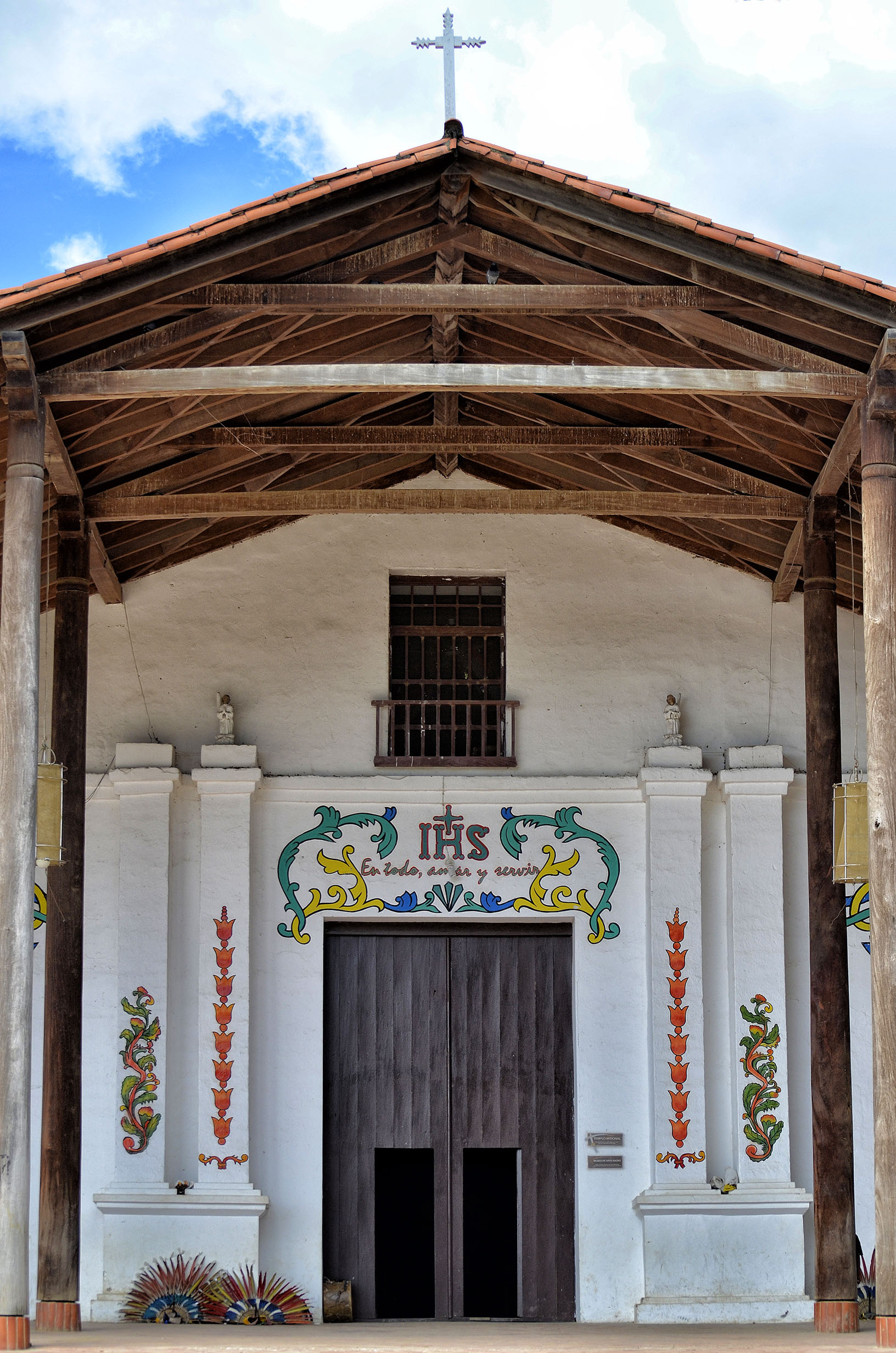
San Ignacio de Moxos

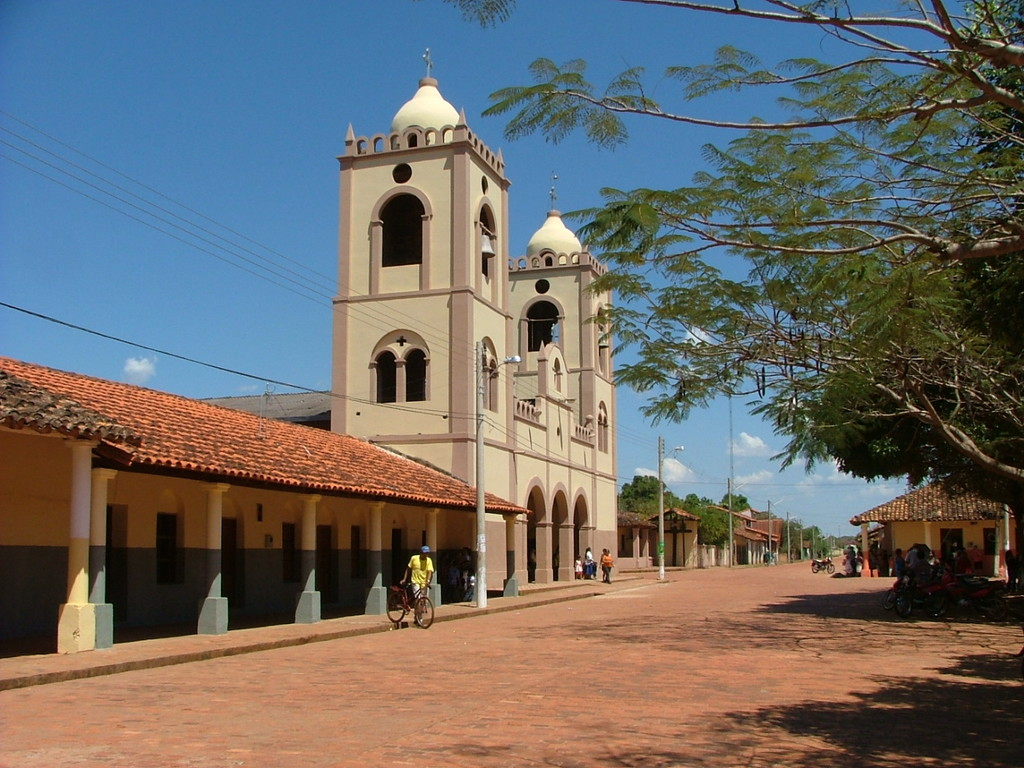
San Joaquín

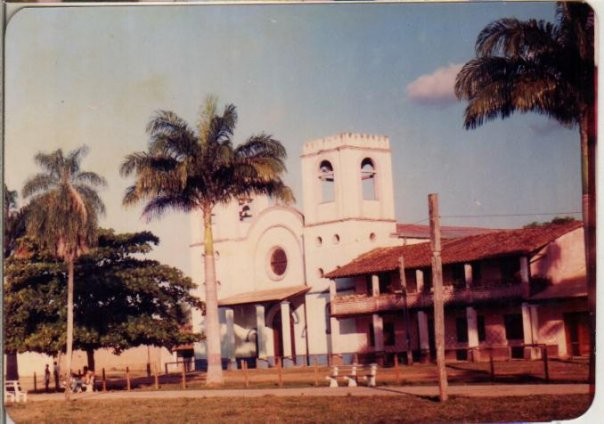
Magdalena in 1990

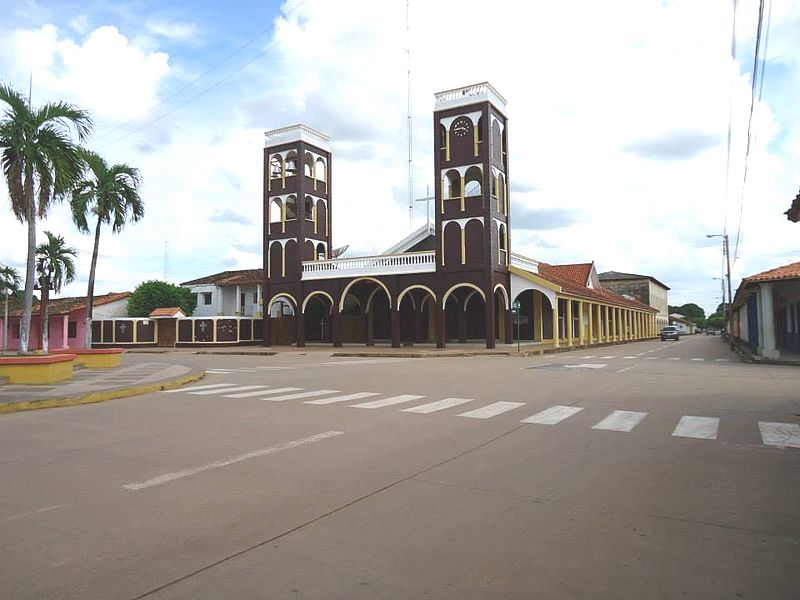
Santa Ana del Yacuma

== See also ==
- List of Jesuit sites
- List of Jesuit Missions of Chiquitos
- Jesuit Missions of Chiquitos
- Llanos de Moxos (archaeology)
- Mojeños
