= Trill consonant =

Type of consonant

In phonetics, a trill is a consonantal sound produced by vibrations between the active articulator and passive articulator. Standard Spanish ⟨rr⟩ as in perro, for example, is an alveolar trill.

A trill is made by the articulator being held in place and the airstream causing it to vibrate. Usually a trill vibrates for 2–3 contacts, but may up to 5, or even more if geminate. However, trills may also be produced with only one contact. While single-contact trills are similar to taps and flaps, a tap or flap differs from a trill in that it is made by a muscular contraction rather than an airstream. Individuals with ankyloglossia may have issues producing the trill sound.

== Phonemic trills ==
Trill consonants included in the International Phonetic Alphabet:

- [ʙ] – Voiced bilabial trill
- [ʙ̥] – Voiceless bilabial trill
- [r] – Voiced alveolar trill
- [r̥] – Voiceless alveolar trill
- [ɽ͡r] – Voiced retroflex trill
- [ɽ͡r̥] – Voiceless retroflex trill
- [ʀ] – Voiced uvular trill
- [ʀ̥] – Voiceless uvular trill
- [ʢ] – Voiced epiglottal trill
- [ʜ] – Voiceless epiglottal trill

In addition,

- [𝼀] – Velopharyngeal trill; the velopharyngeal fricative [ʩ] found in disordered speech sometimes involves trilling of the velopharyngeal port, producing a 'snort'.

The bilabial trill is uncommon. The coronal trill is most frequently alveolar [r͇], but dental and postalveolar articulations [r̪] and [r̠] also occur. An alleged retroflex trill found in Toda has been transcribed [ɽ] (that is, the same as the retroflex flap), but might be less ambiguously written [ɽr], as only the onset is retroflex, with the actual trill being alveolar. The epiglottal trills are identified by the IPA as fricatives, with the trilling assumed to be allophonic. However, analyzing the sounds as trills may be more economical. There are also so-called strident vowels which are accompanied by epiglottal trill.

The cells in the IPA chart for the velar, (upper) pharyngeal, and glottal places of articulation are shaded as impossible. The glottis quite readily vibrates, but this occurs as the phonation of vowels and consonants, not as a consonant of its own. Dorso-palatal and velar vibratory motions of the tongue are occasionally produced, especially during the release of dorsal stops, and ingressive velar trills occur in snoring, but not in normal speech. The upper pharyngeal tract cannot reliably produce a trill, but the epiglottis does, and epiglottal trills are pharyngeal in the broad sense. A partially devoiced uvular or pre-uvular (i.e. between velar and uvular) trill [ʀ̝̊] with some frication occurs as a coda allophone of /ʀ/ in the Limburgish dialects of Maastricht and Weert.

Voiceless trills occur phonemically in e.g. Welsh and Icelandic. (See also voiceless alveolar trill, voiceless retroflex trill, voiceless uvular trill.) Mangbetu and Ninde have phonemically voiceless bilabial trills.

The Czech language has two contrastive alveolar trills, one a fricative trill (written ř in the orthography). In the fricative trill the tongue is raised, so that there is audible frication during the trill, sounding a little like a simultaneous [r] and [ʐ] (or [r̥] and [ʂ] when devoiced). A symbol for this sound, [ɼ], has been dropped from the IPA, and it is now generally transcribed as a raised r, [r̝].

Nuosu Yi has two labiodental fricativized vowels [v͡ʊ v̙͡ɵ̙] (phonemically /u u/, with the underline indicating tenseness) in which the initial fricative elements are often realized as voiceless or voiced bilabial trills [ʙ̥ ʙ] following bilabial and alveolar plosives; both the lax and tense variants may be either type of voicing, depending on the context.

A number of languages have trilled affricates such as [mbʙ] and [dʳ]. The Chapacuran languages Wariʼ, Itene, and Oro Win, as well as the Naga language Sangtam, have a very unusual trilled phoneme, a voiceless bilabially post-trilled dental stop, [t̪͡ʙ̥].

A nasal trill [r̃] has been described from some dialects of Romanian, and is posited as an intermediate historical step in rhotacism. However, the phonetic variation of the sound is considerable, and it is not clear how frequently it is actually trilled. In Inor, [n] can mutate to [r̃], often when prefixes are attached to words beginning with [n], resulting in nasal vowel-consonant harmony. Despite these examples, no language is known to contrast [r̃] phonemically.

== Paralinguistic trills ==
A linguolabial trill [r̼] (or, more precisely, a labiolingual trill [r᫥]) is not known to be used phonemically but occurs when blowing a raspberry.

Snoring typically consists of vibration of the uvula and the soft palate (velum), which may be described as an ingressive velic trill. (Note: Velic is the term used by Pike (1948) for velopharyngeal: articulation between the upper surface of the velum and the back wall of the naso-pharynx. This usage of velic can be found in the 1995 preview of the Handbook of the IPA (Figure 2), but was removed in the 1999 final published version.) Like the uvular trill, the ingressive velic trill does not involve the tongue; it is the velum that passively vibrates in the airstream. The Speculative Grammarian has proposed a jocular symbol for the sound (and also the sound used to imitate a pig's snort), a wide O with a double dot (ꙫ), suggesting a pig's snout. The Extensions to the IPA identifies an egressive fricative pronounced with this same configuration, common with a cleft palate, as velopharyngeal [ʩ], and with accompanying uvular trill as [ʩ𐞪] (i.e. [ʩ^{ʀ}]) or [𝼀] (i.e.).

Lateral trills are also possible and may be pronounced by initiating [ɬ] or [ɮ] with an especially forceful airflow. There is no symbol for them in the IPA.

Ejective trills are not known from any language although they are easy to produce. [rʼ] may occur as mimesis of a cat's purr.

== Summary ==
Attested trilled consonants (excluding secondary phonations and articulations) Sounds in yellow are only attested in disordered speech (extIPA). Sounds in red are only attested from mimesis.
	Labial		Labio- lingual		Dental		Alveolar		Post- alveolar	Retroflex		Uvular		Velo- pharyngeal		Epiglottal	
Plain	ʙ̥	ʙ	r̼̊	r̼	r̪̊	r̪	r̥	r	r̠	ɽr̥	ɽr	ʀ̥	ʀ			ʜ	ʢ
Fricative							r̝̊	r̝				ʀ̝̊	ʀ̝	𝼀	𝼀̬	ʜ	ʢ
Affricate	p͡ʙ̥	b͜ʙ					t͡r̥	d͜r								ʡ͜ʜ	ʡ͜ʢ

== See also ==
- List of phonetics topics
- Bronx cheer (gesture)

== Bibliography ==
- Esling, John H. (2010), "Phonetic Notation", in Hardcastle, William J.; Laver, John; Gibbon, Fiona E. (eds.), The Handbook of Phonetic Sciences (2nd ed.), Wiley-Blackwell, pp. 678–702, doi:10.1002/9781444317251.ch18, ISBN 978-1-4051-4590-9
- Gussenhoven, Carlos; Aarts, Flor (1999), "The dialect of Maastricht" (PDF), Journal of the International Phonetic Association, 29 (2), University of Nijmegen, Centre for Language Studies: 155–166, doi:10.1017/S0025100300006526, S2CID 145782045
- Heijmans, Linda; Gussenhoven, Carlos (1998), "The Dutch dialect of Weert" (PDF), Journal of the International Phonetic Association, 28 (1–2): 107–112, doi:10.1017/S0025100300006307, S2CID 145635698
- Ladefoged, Peter; Maddieson, Ian (1996), The Sounds of the World's Languages, Oxford: Blackwell, ISBN 0-631-19815-6
- Ladefoged, Peter; Johnson, Keith (2010), A Course in Phonetics (6th ed.), Wadsworth, ISBN 978-1-42823126-9
- Sampson, Rodney (1999), Nasal Vowel Evolution in Romance, Oxford University Press, ISBN 0-19-823848-7

Place →	Labial					Coronal										Dorsal					Laryngeal			
Manner ↓	Bilabial		Labiodental		Linguolabial		Dental		Alveolar		Postalveolar		Retroflex		(Alveolo-)palatal		Velar		Uvular		Pharyngeal/epiglottal		Glottal	
Nasal	m̥	m	ɱ̊	ɱ		n̼	n̪̊	n̪	n̥	n	n̠̊	n̠	ɳ̊	ɳ	ɲ̊	ɲ	ŋ̊	ŋ	ɴ̥	ɴ				
Plosive	p	b	p̪	b̪	t̼	d̼	t̪	d̪	t	d			ʈ	ɖ	c	ɟ	k	ɡ	q	ɢ	ʡ		ʔ	
Sibilant affricate							t̪s̪	d̪z̪	ts	dz	t̠ʃ	d̠ʒ	tʂ	dʐ	tɕ	dʑ								
Non-sibilant affricate	pɸ	bβ	p̪f	b̪v			t̪θ	d̪ð	tɹ̝̊	dɹ̝	t̠ɹ̠̊˔	d̠ɹ̠˔			cç	ɟʝ	kx	ɡɣ	qχ	ɢʁ	ʡʜ	ʡʢ	ʔh	
Sibilant fricative							s̪	z̪	s	z	ʃ	ʒ	ʂ	ʐ	ɕ	ʑ								
Non-sibilant fricative	ɸ	β	f	v	θ̼	ð̼	θ	ð	θ̠	ð̠	ɹ̠̊˔	ɹ̠˔	ɻ̊˔	ɻ˔	ç	ʝ	x	ɣ	χ	ʁ	ħ	ʕ	h	ɦ
Approximant		β̞		ʋ				ð̞		ɹ		ɹ̠		ɻ		j		ɰ						˷
Tap/flap		ⱱ̟		ⱱ					ɾ̥	ɾ			ɽ̊	ɽ						ɢ̆		ʡ̮		
Trill	ʙ̥	ʙ							r̥	r		r̠	ɽ̊r̥	ɽr					ʀ̥	ʀ	ʜ	ʢ		
Lateral affricate									tɬ	dɮ			tꞎ	d𝼅	c𝼆	ɟʎ̝	k𝼄	ɡʟ̝						
Lateral fricative							ɬ̪		ɬ	ɮ			ꞎ	𝼅	𝼆	ʎ̝	𝼄	ʟ̝						
Lateral approximant								l̪	l̥	l		l̠	ɭ̊	ɭ	ʎ̥	ʎ	ʟ̥	ʟ		ʟ̠				
Lateral tap/flap									ɺ̥	ɺ			𝼈̊	𝼈		ʎ̮		ʟ̆						

		BL	LD	D	A	PA	RF	P	V	U
Implosive	Voiced	ɓ			ɗ		ᶑ	ʄ	ɠ	ʛ
Implosive	Voiceless	ɓ̥			ɗ̥		ᶑ̊	ʄ̊	ɠ̊	ʛ̥
Ejective	Stop	pʼ			tʼ		ʈʼ	cʼ	kʼ	qʼ
Ejective	Affricate		p̪fʼ	t̪θʼ	tsʼ	t̠ʃʼ	tʂʼ	tɕʼ	kxʼ	qχʼ
Ejective	Fricative	ɸʼ	fʼ	θʼ	sʼ	ʃʼ	ʂʼ	ɕʼ	xʼ	χʼ
Ejective	Lateral affricate				tɬʼ			c𝼆ʼ	k𝼄ʼ	q𝼄ʼ
Ejective	Lateral fricative				ɬʼ					
Click (top: velar; bottom: uvular)	Tenuis	kʘ qʘ		kǀ qǀ	kǃ qǃ		k𝼊 q𝼊	kǂ qǂ		
Click (top: velar; bottom: uvular)	Voiced	ɡʘ ɢʘ		ɡǀ ɢǀ	ɡǃ ɢǃ		ɡ𝼊 ɢ𝼊	ɡǂ ɢǂ		
Click (top: velar; bottom: uvular)	Nasal	ŋʘ ɴʘ		ŋǀ ɴǀ	ŋǃ ɴǃ		ŋ𝼊 ɴ𝼊	ŋǂ ɴǂ	ʞ	
Click (top: velar; bottom: uvular)	Tenuis lateral				kǁ qǁ					
Click (top: velar; bottom: uvular)	Voiced lateral				ɡǁ ɢǁ					
Click (top: velar; bottom: uvular)	Nasal lateral				ŋǁ ɴǁ					
