= Kuyubí language =

Dialect of Moré

Kuyubí
- Kujubim, Kumaná
- Kaw To Yo, Kaw Tayó
- Native to: Bolivia, Brazil
- Region: Southwestern Rondônia, Bolivia–Brazil border area
- Ethnicity: 27 (2001)
- Extinct: by 2023
- Language family: Chapacuran: More; Kuyubí

Language codes
- ISO 639-3: –
- Glottolog: kuyu1236
- Linguasphere: 88-HAA-ab
- Kujubim is classified as Critically Endangered by the UNESCO Atlas of the World's Languages in Danger.

Kujubim (Kuyubí, Cojubím) is a recently extinct dialect of Moré, a Chapacuran language, formerly spoken around the city of Guajará-Mirim in Rondônia, Brazil. The endonym, Kaw To Yo (or Kaw Tayó, which means 'eaters of payara fish'), may be the source of the river and synonym for this language, Cautario. Sources which list one do not list the other, so these may be the same language.

In addition, there is a closely related variety called Cumana (Kumaná), a possibly extinct variety of Kuyubí. Kumaná was documented in a wordlist by Emil Heinrich Snethlage in the 1930s. Various names ascribed to the language in Campbell (2012) are Torá, Toraz (distinguish Torá language), and Cautario, the last perhaps after the local river, and Abitana-Kumaná (distinguish Abitana dialect).

== Phonology ==
=== Consonants ===
Consonants
		Bilabial	Alveolar	Palatal (-alveolar)	Velar	Glottal
Nasal	plain	m	n	ɲ		
Nasal	preglottalized	ˀm	ˀn	ˀɲ		
Nasal	postglottalized	mˀ	nˀ	ɲˀ		
Plosive/ Affricate	plain	p	t	t͡ʃ	k	ʔ
Plosive/ Affricate	preglottalized	ˀp	ˀt		ˀk	
Fricative	voiceless		s			h
Fricative	voiced		z			
Sonorant	plain		ɾ	j	w	
Sonorant	preglottalized		ˀɾ	ˀj	ˀw	
Sonorant	postglottalized			jˀ	wˀ	

=== Vowels ===
Vowels
	Front	Central	Back
High	i		u
Mid	ɛ		ɔ
Low		a	

== Vocabulary ==
Conjubim vocabulary from Sampaio & da Silva (2011):

gloss	Conjubim
‘I (1sg)’	pa
‘thou (2sg)’	ma
‘we (1pl)’	ti
‘many’	napa
‘one’	tan
‘two’	wakoran
‘big’	pu
‘small’	pe
‘woman’	tana'man
‘man (adult male human)’	namankon
‘child’	rato
‘person (individual human)’	piten
‘bird’	pune
‘dog’	kinam
‘louse (lice)’	piw
‘tree’	pana
‘seed (n)’	tukayn
‘leaf (botanics)’	tan
‘root (botanics)’	toka ijn pana
‘meat/flesh’	nawa zip
‘blood (n)’	wik
‘bone’	pat
‘egg’	pariz
‘fat (organic substance)’	mapum
‘horn’	tataw
‘tail’	kipun
‘hair (of head)’	tunam upek
‘head (anatomic)’	pupek
‘ear’	tenetet
‘eye’	tok
‘nose’	pul
‘tooth (general)’	jat
‘tongue (anatomical)’	kapajak
‘fingernail’	tupi
‘foot (not leg)’	tinak
‘knee’	toko zimtinak
‘hand (not arm)’	pepeje tipan
‘belly (abdomen, stomach)’	takawta
‘heart (organ)’	tuku rutim
‘liver’	tawan
‘drink (v)’	tok
‘eat’	kaw
‘bite (v)’	kiw
‘ash(es)’	pop
‘burn (tr. v)’	pop
‘see (v)’	kirik
‘hear (v)’	rapat
‘sleep (v)’	pupiyn
‘die (v)’	pinĩ
‘kill (v)’	puru
‘swim (v)’	mara kujan
‘fly (v)’	ze
‘walk (v)’	wana
‘lie (recline) (v)’	titim
‘sit (v)’	pe
‘stand (v)’	pak
‘give (v)’	ni
‘sun’	mapitõ
‘moon’	panawo
‘star’	pipojõ
‘water (n)’	kom
‘rain (n)’	pipan narikom
‘sand’	tinak
‘earth (soil, ground)’	tinak
‘tobacco’	ju'e
‘fire’	pite
‘red (colour)’	siwí
‘white (colour)’	towa
‘night’	pisim
‘warm’	nok
‘cold’	tiw
‘full’	pẽpe
‘good’	nami
‘round’	pu

A word list with 793 lexical items is also available from Rodrigues Duran (2000).

== Bibliography ==
- Duran, Iris Rodrigues. 2000. Descrição fonológica e lexical do dialeto Kaw Tayo (Kujubi) da língua Moré. MA thesis, Guajará-Mirim: Universidade Federal de Rondônia; 136pp.
- Angenot, Geralda de Lima V. 1997. vDocumentação da língua Kuyubi: Arquivos acústicos. Guajará-Mirim: UNIR Working Papers in Amerindian Linguistics. Série 'Documentos de Trabalho'.
- Angenot, Geralda de Lima V. and Angenot, Geralda de Lima V. 1997. Léxico Português-Kuyubi e Kuyubi-Português. Guajará-Mirim: UNIR Working Papers in Amerindian Linguistics.
