= Pacaás Novos =

Pacaás Novos may refer to:

- Pacaás Novos National Park
- Rio Pacaás Novos Extractive Reserve
- Pacaás Novos River
- Pacaás Novos language
- Wariʼ (Pakaa Nova) people
