= Mure language =

Extinct language of Bolivia

Mure
- Native to: Bolivia
- Region: Beni Department
- Ethnicity: Mure
- Extinct: (date missing)
- Language family: Language isolate

Language codes
- ISO 639-3: None (mis)
- Glottolog: mure1235

Mure is an extinct language of Bolivia.

== Classification ==
It was long considered a Chapacuran language, but the similarities are few, and are likely loans, as the Mure were missioned together with speakers of Chapacuran languages. Apart from those few words, the languages are "utterly different" according to Glottolog, a view that is shared by Birchall (2013). Other sources maintain that Mure is Chapacuran.

== Geographical distribution ==
The Mure lived in the Jesuit Missions of Moxos. They mostly resided in San Simón Mission, with some also living in San Francisco de Borja Mission together with the Movima. Neighbors of the Mure included the Rokorona.

== Vocabulary ==
Mure basic vocabulary items selected from the glossed interlinear texts below:

gloss	Mure
three	raare
in the sky/heaven	vua-n-apina
earth	tiemao
days	tovona
name	vee
1.P (our)	sere-

== Sample texts ==
Mure is attested only by a few surviving texts of the Lord's Prayer, Hail Mary, and Nicene Creed. The texts have been analyzed by Georges de Crequi-Montfort and Paul Rivet (1913). There are also sporadic mentions of the Mure language by Lorenzo Hervás y Panduro (1800: 251) and Cosme Bueno (1770).

The texts below are reproduced from Teza (1868). Interlinear analyses are adapted from de Crequi-Montfort & Rivet (1913), with the original French glossing also included.

=== Pater Noster ===
The Lord's Prayer:

Core papa matichico vuanapina sciriquiticacayo vuanataa mivee:
viquitiscianca mi reyno:
sciriquititietaa mepapala huachimesno, otichana vuanapina.
Seramevuae mirimanovohtate vire:
miriquiacaravna nate serepecatovuae, otichana sererivuae serasciquiacaravuaco velene:
miritacamitate pecato, miritacamitate tascacae lapena.
Amen.

Analysis:

Kore-papa matičiko vua-n-apina; sciri-kiti-kakayo vua-nataa mi-vee; vi-kiti-scianka {mi-reyno (rei-)}; sciri-kiti-tietaa me-papala huači-mesno, otičana vua-n-apina. Sera-me-vuae miri-manovoh-tate vire; miri-kiakaravua-nate sere-pekato-vuae, otičana sereri-vuae {sera-sci-kiakaravua-ko velene}; miri-takami-tate pekato, miri-takami-tate taskakae lapena. Amen.
Seigneur {} au-ciel; que-nous-honorions ici-bas ton-nom; qu’il-vienne ton-royaume; que-nous-fassions ta-volonté {} comme au-ciel. {nos aliments} donne aujourd’hui; pardonne nos-péchés, comme nous nous-pardonnons; délivre péché délivre {} mal. Amen.
{Our father} {} {in heaven} {that we honor} {here below} {your name} come {your kingdom} {that we do} {your will} {} as {in heaven} {our food} give today forgive {our sins} as we {we forgive} deliver sin deliver {} evil Amen.

=== Ave Maria ===
The Hail Mary:

Ave María netacoco gracia,
Dios neneyta,
coni tanascaca nerememeco,
chane rememena neca Jesús.
Santa María vemama Dios sererivuae serelapeta miritacataatate vire,
chane seretamivahtay.
Amen.

Analysis:

Ave Maria ne-takoko grasia, {Dios ne-neyta}, koni tana-skaka ne- rememe-ko, čane rememe-na neka Jesus. Santa Maria, ve-mama Dios, sereri-vuae sere-lapeta miri-takataa-tate vire, čane sere-tami-vah-tay. Amen.
Salut Marie toi-pleine grâce, {Dieu toi-avec}, {} femmes toi- bénie, aussi béni, ton-fils, Jésus, Sainte Marie, mère Dieu, nous nous-méchants prie aujourd’hui, aussi notre-mort. Amen.
Ave Maria you-full grace {God with you} {} women you blessed also blessed {your son} Jesus Saint Mary mother God we {we sinners} pray today also {our death} Amen.

=== Nicene Creed ===
The Nicene Creed (adapted):

Scipalohnaa Dios apa careneemipina, vuatiemao vuanapina, chane au, scipalohnaa serepapavuae Jesu Christo pastocte veca Dios, otireereneco parih virgen Santa María, vuatieo Espiritu Santo ticomateo, tamimacacararacoo timamico Poncio Pilato, talanateo cruzu, tamivacoo, quiscilohnateo, taminacaspavecoo quesno:
tovona raare tamiracoo, taminavocoo, tamimecoo vuanapina:
otipasseco vimañuh ve papa careneemipina: huay vuatiaqui tamimapoymiaqui vepecatovuae reerene cavee, abaque.
Scipalohnaa Espiritu Santo, Santa Iglesia Catholica ve comunio santovuae, vevaque pecato, tamiratay, taminavotay abaque, tamivuaelalatay remena christiano vepassacano Dios tapalapalatay.
Amen.

Analysis:

Scipalohnaa Dios apa kare-neemipina vua-tiemao vua-n-apina {čane au}; scipalohnaa {sere papa-vuae} Jesu-Kristo pastokte veka Dios, otireere- neko parih virgen {Santa Maria}, vuatieo {espiritu santo} ti-komateo, tami- makakarara-koo ti-mamiko {Poncio Pilato}, tala-nateo kruzu, tami-va-koo, kisciloh-nateo, {tami-nakaspave-koo kesno}; tovona raare tami-ra-hoo, tami- navo-koo, tami-me-koo vua-n-apina; otipasseko v-itnañuh ve-papa kare- neemipina; huay vua-tiaki tami-mapoymiaki ve-pekato-vuae reerene kavee, aba-ke. Scipalohnaa {espiritu santo}, {santa iglesia katholika}, ve-komunio santo-vuae, vevake pekato, tami-ra-tay, tami-navo-tay aba-ke, tami-vua-olala-tay remena kristiano vepassakano Dios tapalapala-tay. Amen.
Je-crois Dieu père tout-puissant sur-terre au-ciel aussi je-crois notre- Jesus-Christ unique son-fils Dieu, {} {} {} vierge {Sainte Marie}, {} {Esprit Saint} par-l’œuvre, il- souffrit par-l’ordre {Ponce Pilate}, fut-mis croix, mourut, fut-enterré, descendit jours trois il-resta, il- ressuscita, il-monta au-ciel; {} à-la-droite père tout- puissant; de là il-viendra péchés {} vivants, morts. Je-crois {Esprit Saint}, {sainte église catholique}, communion saints, pardon péché, {} résurrection morts, {} bons chrétiens {} Dieu {} Amen.
{I believe} God father almighty {on earth} {in heaven} also {I believe} our {Jesus Christ} only his-son God {} {} {} virgin {Saint Mary} {} {Holy Spirit} {by the work} he suffered {by the command} {Pontius Pilate} {was placed} cross died {was buried} descended days three {he stayed} he resurrected {he ascended} {to heaven} {} {on the right} father all almighty of here {he will come} sins {} living dead {I believe} {Holy Spirit} {Holy Catholic Church} communion saints forgive sin {} resurrection dead {} good Christian {} God {} Amen.
