= Voiceless bilabial trill =

Consonantal sound represented by ⟨ʙ̥⟩ in IPA

ʙ̥

ʙ̊

Audio sample
- source · help

Encoding
- X-SAMPA: B\_0

A voiceless bilabial trill is a type of consonantal sound, used in some spoken languages. The symbol in the International Phonetic Alphabet that represents this sound is ⟨ʙ̥⟩. Some sources use a para-IPA symbol ⟨ᴘ⟩ to transcribe this sound.

This sound is typologically extremely rare. It occurs in languages such as Pará Arára. Only a few languages contrast voiced and voiceless bilabial trills phonemically – e.g. Mangbetu and Dongo of DR Congo and Ninde of Vanuatu.

== Features ==
Features of a bilabial trill:

- Its manner of articulation is trill, which means it is produced by directing air over an articulator so that it vibrates.
- Its place of articulation is bilabial, which means it is articulated with both lips.
- Its phonation is voiceless, which means it is produced without vibrations of the vocal cords.
- It is an oral consonant, which means that air is not allowed to escape through the nose.
- Because the sound is not produced with airflow over the tongue, the median–lateral dichotomy does not apply.
- Its airstream mechanism is pulmonic, which means it is articulated by pushing air only with the intercostal muscles and abdominal muscles, as in most speech sounds.

== Occurrence ==
=== Plain ===
Language	Word	IPA	Meaning	Notes
Ahamb		[ŋãˈʙ̥̍s]	'it foams'	Contrasts with /ᵐʙ, ⁿᵈr/.
Dongo	ppo̍ppo̍-kó	[ʙ̥ōʙ̥ōkó]	'wings'	Contrasts with /ʙ, p/; has allophone [pʰ].
Mangbetu		[nóʙ̥ù]	'to bring out'	Contrasts with /ʙ, ᵐʙ, ⱱ/.
Neverver		[naɣaᵐʙ̥]	'fire, firewood'	Allophone of /p/ before /u/
Pará Arára		[ʙ̥uta]	'to throw away'	

=== Prestopped trills and stops with trill release ===
There is also a very rare voiceless bilabially post-trilled dental or alveolar stop, [t̪͡ʙ̥] (written ⟨tᵖ̃⟩ in Everett & Kern) reported from a few words in the Chapacuran languages Wariʼ, Moré, and Oro Win, as well as Sangtam, a Naga language. The sound also appears as an allophone of the labialized voiceless alveolar stop /tʷ/ of Abkhaz and Ubykh, but in those languages it is more often realised by a doubly articulated stop [t͡p]. In the Chapacuran languages, [tʙ̥] is reported almost exclusively before rounded vowels such as [o] and [y].

Additionally, the Efe dialect of Lese has a doubly articulated labial–velar with trilled release [k͡ʙ̥], which occurs as an allophone of the voiceless labial–velar plosive /k͡p/.

In some languages, the trill may be voiced, particularly when syllabic; see Voiced bilabial trill § Prestopped trills and stops with trill release.

Language		Word	IPA	Meaning	Notes
Lese	Efe		[uk͡ʙ̥u]	'head'	Allophone of /k͡p/.
Moré			[t̪͡ʙ̥uː]	'black frog (sp.)'	Phonemic
Oro Win			[t̪͡ʙ̥ym t̪͡ʙ̥ym]	'helicopter'	Allophone of /t̪/ before /y/.
Sangtam			[t̪͡ʙ̥ʰʌ]	'plate'	Contrasts aspirated /t̪͡ʙ̥ʰ/ and unaspirated /t̪͡ʙ̥/, noted as 'prestopped trills'. The trill in the unaspirated consonant is typically voiced as [t̪͡ʙ] when word-medial.
Ubykh		tuex̂ıbze	[t͡ʙ̥aχəbza]	'Ubykh language'	Allophone of /tʷ/. See Ubykh phonology
Wariʼ		totowe'	[t̪͡ʙ̥ot̪͡ʙ̥oˈweʔ]	'chicken'	Occurs only before /o, y/, appearing almost exclusively in older speakers; allophonic with [t] in some dialects

== Bibliography ==
- Angenot, Geralda de Lima Vitor (2002). Description Phonologique, Grammaticale et Lexicale du Moré, Langue Amazonienne de Bolivie et du Brésil (PDF) (in French). Vol. 1. Rijksuniversiteit te Leiden dissertation. p. 67.
- Angenot, Geralda de Lima Vitor (2013-08-23). "FONOTÁTICA E FONOLOGIA DO LEXEMA PROTOCHAPAKURA". Revista Eletrônica Língua Viva (in Brazilian Portuguese). 3 (1) 1: 31–37. ISSN 2237-9800.
- Barbour, Julie (2012). A Grammar of Neverver. Mouton de Gruyter. pp. 33–34. ISBN 9783110289619.
- Coupe, Alexander (2015). "Prestopped bilabial trills in Sangtam". Proceedings of the 18th International Congress of Phonetic Sciences, Glasgow, 10–14 August 2015.
- Coupe, Alexander (2020). "Northern Sangtam phonetics, phonology and word list". Linguistics of the Tibeto-Burman Area. 43 (1): 148–189. doi:10.1075/ltba.19014.cou. hdl:10356/146605.
- Demolin, Didier; Teston, Bernard (September 1997). "Phonetic characteristics of double articulations in some Mangbutu-Efe languages" (PDF). International Speech Communication Association: 803–806.
- de Souza, Isaac Costa (2010). "3". A Phonological Description of "Pet Talk" in Arara (MA). University of North Dakota. S2CID 61247622.
- Everett, Daniel; Kern, Barbara (1997). Wariʼ: The Pacaas Novos language of western Brazil. London: Routledge. p. 385.
- Ladefoged, Peter (2005). Vowels and Consonants (2nd ed.). Blackwell.
- Olson, Kenneth S. (2022-05-05). "The Nonexistence of the Plain Bilabial Trill Phoneme". Proceedings of the Linguistic Society of America. 7 (1): 5239. doi:10.3765/plsa.v7i1.5239.
- Pasch, Helma (1986). Die Mba-Sprachen: Die Nominalklassensysteme und die genetische Gliederung einer Gruppe von Ubangi-Sprachen. Sprache und Geschichte in Afrika (SUGIA) (in German). Vol. Suplement 6. Köln: Rüdiger Köppe. p. 359. ISSN 0720-0986.
- Rangelov, Tihomir (2019). "The bilabial trills of Ahamb (Vanuatu): Acoustic and articulatory properties" (PDF). In Calhoun, S.; Escudero, P.; Tabain, M.; Warren, P. (eds.). Proceedings of the 19th International Congress of Phonetic Sciences, Melbourne, Australia 2019. Canberra: Australasian Speech Science and Technology Association. pp. 1292–1296.
- Rangelov, Tihomir; Walworth, Mary; Barbour, Julie (2023). "A multifaceted approach to understanding unexpected sound change: The bilabial trills of Vanuatu's Malekula Island". Diachronica. doi:10.1075/dia.21051.ran. hdl:10289/15510. ISSN 0176-4225.

Place →	Labial					Coronal										Dorsal					Laryngeal			
Manner ↓	Bilabial		Labiodental		Linguolabial		Dental		Alveolar		Postalveolar		Retroflex		(Alveolo-)palatal		Velar		Uvular		Pharyngeal/epiglottal		Glottal	
Nasal	m̥	m	ɱ̊	ɱ		n̼	n̪̊	n̪	n̥	n	n̠̊	n̠	ɳ̊	ɳ	ɲ̊	ɲ	ŋ̊	ŋ	ɴ̥	ɴ				
Plosive	p	b	p̪	b̪	t̼	d̼	t̪	d̪	t	d			ʈ	ɖ	c	ɟ	k	ɡ	q	ɢ	ʡ		ʔ	
Sibilant affricate							t̪s̪	d̪z̪	ts	dz	t̠ʃ	d̠ʒ	tʂ	dʐ	tɕ	dʑ								
Non-sibilant affricate	pɸ	bβ	p̪f	b̪v			t̪θ	d̪ð	tɹ̝̊	dɹ̝	t̠ɹ̠̊˔	d̠ɹ̠˔			cç	ɟʝ	kx	ɡɣ	qχ	ɢʁ	ʡʜ	ʡʢ	ʔh	
Sibilant fricative							s̪	z̪	s	z	ʃ	ʒ	ʂ	ʐ	ɕ	ʑ								
Non-sibilant fricative	ɸ	β	f	v	θ̼	ð̼	θ	ð	θ̠	ð̠	ɹ̠̊˔	ɹ̠˔	ɻ̊˔	ɻ˔	ç	ʝ	x	ɣ	χ	ʁ	ħ	ʕ	h	ɦ
Approximant		β̞		ʋ				ð̞		ɹ		ɹ̠		ɻ		j		ɰ						˷
Tap/flap		ⱱ̟		ⱱ					ɾ̥	ɾ			ɽ̊	ɽ						ɢ̆		ʡ̆		
Trill	ʙ̥	ʙ							r̥	r		r̠	ɽ̊r̥	ɽr					ʀ̥	ʀ	ʜ	ʢ		
Lateral affricate									tɬ	dɮ			tꞎ	d𝼅	c𝼆	ɟʎ̝	k𝼄	ɡʟ̝						
Lateral fricative							ɬ̪		ɬ	ɮ			ꞎ	𝼅	𝼆	ʎ̝	𝼄	ʟ̝						
Lateral approximant								l̪	l̥	l		l̠	ɭ̊	ɭ	ʎ̥	ʎ	ʟ̥	ʟ		ʟ̠				
Lateral tap/flap									ɺ̥	ɺ			𝼈̊	𝼈		ʎ̆		ʟ̆						

		BL	LD	D	A	PA	RF	P	V	U
Implosive	Voiced	ɓ			ɗ		ᶑ	ʄ	ɠ	ʛ
Implosive	Voiceless	ɓ̥			ɗ̥		ᶑ̊	ʄ̊	ɠ̊	ʛ̥
Ejective	Stop	pʼ			tʼ		ʈʼ	cʼ	kʼ	qʼ
Ejective	Affricate		p̪fʼ	tθʼ	tsʼ	tʃʼ	tʂʼ	tɕʼ	kxʼ	qχʼ
Ejective	Fricative	ɸʼ	fʼ	θʼ	sʼ	ʃʼ	ʂʼ	ɕʼ	xʼ	χʼ
Ejective	Lateral affricate				tɬʼ			c𝼆ʼ	k𝼄ʼ	q𝼄ʼ
Ejective	Lateral fricative				ɬʼ					
Click (top: velar; bottom: uvular)	Tenuis	kʘ qʘ		kǀ qǀ	kǃ qǃ		k𝼊 q𝼊	kǂ qǂ		
Click (top: velar; bottom: uvular)	Voiced	ɡʘ ɢʘ		ɡǀ ɢǀ	ɡǃ ɢǃ		ɡ𝼊 ɢ𝼊	ɡǂ ɢǂ		
Click (top: velar; bottom: uvular)	Nasal	ŋʘ ɴʘ		ŋǀ ɴǀ	ŋǃ ɴǃ		ŋ𝼊 ɴ𝼊	ŋǂ ɴǂ	ʞ	
Click (top: velar; bottom: uvular)	Tenuis lateral				kǁ qǁ					
Click (top: velar; bottom: uvular)	Voiced lateral				ɡǁ ɢǁ					
Click (top: velar; bottom: uvular)	Nasal lateral				ŋǁ ɴǁ					
