= Iténez (disambiguation) =

Iténez may refer to:

- Río Iténez, a river in western Brazil and northeastern Bolivia, which partly forms the border between Brazil and Bolivia.
- Iténez Province, in the Beni Department, Bolivia.

== See also ==
- Iténez or Itene language (also named Moré), a Chapacuran language spoken in the Beni Department, Bolivia.
