= Urupa language =

Extinct Chapacuran language of Brazil

Urupa
- Urupá-Jarú
- Ituarupa
- Native to: Brazil
- Region: SE of Ariquemes
- Extinct: mid-20th century
- Language family: Chapacuran: Wari; Urupa
- Dialects: Urupa; Yaru

Language codes
- ISO 639-3: None (mis), unless Urupa is a synonym of Uru-pa-in
- Glottolog: urup1245
- Urupá is classified as Extinct by the UNESCO Atlas of the World's Languages in Danger.

Urupa (Urupá, Ituarupá) is an extinct Chapacuran language. Yaru (Yarú, Jarú) was a dialect or a closely related language.
