= Moré language (Bolivia) =

Chapacuran language of Bolivia

Moré
- Itene
- Native to: Bolivia; Brazil
- Region: Beni Department formerly south-western Rondônia
- Ethnicity: Moré people
- Native speakers: 45 <12 (Birchall 2016)
- Language family: Chapacuran: Moreic-Waric; Moreic-Tor; Moré
- Dialects: Kuyubí

Official status
- Official language in: Bolivia

Language codes
- ISO 639-3: ite
- Glottolog: iten1243
- ELP: Itene
- Moré is classified as Critically Endangered by the UNESCO Atlas of the World's Languages in Danger.

Moré (or Itene) is a Chapacuran language of Bolivia.

Kuyubí is an extinct dialect of Moré. Itoreauhip has been described variously as a dialect, an independent language or an alternative name for the Moré people.

== Status ==
Joshua Birchall found no more than a dozen remaining speakers in the 2010s. The language is traditionally spoken by the Moré people, who live around the confluence of the Guaporé (Iténez) and Mamoré rivers in Bolivia. They were settled by Jesuits onto the missions of San Miguel, San Judas, and San Simón but after the expulsion of the Jesuits they returned to their traditional territory. They were recontacted in 1935 by the German ethnographer Emil Heinrich Snethlage.

== Classification ==
Birchall, Dunn and Greenhill (2013) classify Moré as belonging to a Moreic-Waric clade of the Chapacuran language family.

- Chapacuran
  - Moreic–Waric
    - Moreic–Tor
      - Nuclear Moré
        - Moré
        - Kuyubí
      - Torá
    - Waric (includes Wariʼ, the only vibrant Chapacuran language)
  - Kitemoka-Tapakura

In 2016 the same three authors published a computational phylogenetic analysis confirming Moré's position as closest to the extinct Torá language.

== Phonology ==
The language's phonology was described by Geralda Angenot de Lima in her 2002 doctoral thesis and in her 1997 masters dissertation (reproduced as a journal article in 2013) where she presented a reconstruction of Proto-Chapacuran with summary descriptions of all languages in the family; however, her analysis differs significantly across the two texts. The following information derives from her 2002 thesis.

=== Consonants ===
		Labial		Alveolar		Post- alveolar	Palatal	Velar	Glottal
		plain	lab.	plain	pal.	Post- alveolar	Palatal	Velar	Glottal
Nasal	voiced	m	mʷ	n			ɲ		
Nasal	preglottal	ˀ͡ᵐ̥m	ˀ͡ᵐ̥ʷ̥mʷ	ˀ͡ⁿ̥n			ˀ͡ᶮ̥ɲ		
Nasal	glottalized	mˀ͡ᵐ̥		nˀ͡ⁿ̥			ɲˀ͡ᶮ̥		
Plosive	voiceless	p	pʷ̥	t	tʲ̥	t̠̻	(c)	k	ʔ
Plosive	preglottal	ˀ͡ᵖp	ˀ͡ᵖʷ̥pʷ̥	ˀ͡ᵗt	ˀ͡ᵗʲtʲ̥			ˀ͡ᵏk	
Plosive	post-trilled			t𐞄̥					
Fricative		β		s		ʒ̟			h
Approximant	plain	w					j		h
Approximant	preglottal	ˀ͡ʷ̥w					ˀ͡ʲ̥j		
Approximant	glottalized	wˀ͡ʷ̥					jˀ͡ʲ̥		

- All plosives are realized as unreleased [C̚] word-finally.
- /p/ is heard as [ɸ] in initial position before /u/.
- /t/ can be heard as a tap [ɾ] between vowels.
- /k/ is palatalized to [c] when following /i/, and as [cᶜ̧] when preceding /i/ in initial position.
- /k/ and /ˀ͡ᵏk/ are heard as [kˣ] and [ˀ͡ᵏkˣ] when in initial position in free variation.
- /tʲ̥/ and /ˀ͡ᵗʲtʲ̥/ are heard as post-fricativized [t̠ᶴ] and [ˀ͡ᵗt̠ᶴ] when in initial positions.
- /ʒ̟/ is heard as a lateral [ɮ] in word-final position.
- /w/ is heard as [β] when after /ɛ/.
- /t/ and /s/ lose their phonemic contrast in the coda position, being neutralized to [t̚].

=== Vowels ===
	Front	Central	Back
Close	i		u
Mid	ɛ		ɔ
Open		a	

Phoneme/Phone	Allophones	Rules
/i/ [i]	[ɪ̆]	/__$ˈ
/i/ [i]	[ʉ̞̆]	_Cʷ_
/i/ [i]	[ʉ]	ˈ_Cʷ_
/i/ [i]	[iː]	/ˈC__$
/i/ [i]	[i]	elsewhere
/ɛ/ [ɛ]	[ə̆]	/__$ˈ
/ɛ/ [ɛ]	[ə]	/__C$
/ɛ/ [ɛ]	[əː]	/ˈC__$
/ɛ/ [ɛ]	[ɵ]	_Cʷ_
/ɛ/ [ɛ]	[ɛ̆]	/__$ˈC
/ɛ/ [ɛ]	[ɛː]	/ˈʔ__$
/ɛ/ [ɛ]	[ɛ]	elsewhere
/a/ [a]	[ɐ̆]	/__$ˈ
/a/ [a]	[aː]	/ˈC__$
/a/ [a]	[a]	elsewhere
/ɔ/ [ɔ]	[ɔ̆]	/__$ˈ
/ɔ/ [ɔ]	[ɔː]	/ˈC__$
/ɔ/ [ɔ]	[ɔ]	elsewhere
/u/ [u]	[ʊ̆]	/__$ˈ
/u/ [u]	[uː]	/ˈC__$
/u/ [u]	[u]	elsewhere

== See also ==
- Wariʼ language, the only vibrant language in the same language family, spoken in Rondônia, Brazil
