= Yarú language =

Extinct Chapacuran language

Yarú
- Jarú
- Native to: Brazil
- Region: Rondônia
- Extinct: after 1927
- Language family: Chapacuran: Moreic-Waric; Waric; Urupa-Yaru; Yarú

Language codes
- ISO 639-3: None (mis)
- Glottolog: yaru1257

Yarú is an extinct Chapacuran language of Brazil. It is closely related to Urupa.

== Vocabulary ==
Yarú vocabulary
Yarú	gloss	Yarú	gloss
mapip	bow	kosagái	black
kotoá	white	tekisí	eye
ahōp	crocodile	traisí	ear
itisí	tooth	toráu	parrot
kō	water	koíp	small
upiú	star	katimasí	foot
yamiriman	woman	paken	stone
isī	fire	iham	fish
kiú	arrow	liuin	pot
kohorá	large	kotēm	red
ikit	axe	krakraon	snake
kitraman	man	orām	monkey
komen	jaguar	komém	sun
kapiakasí	tongue	kauéuéuē	tapir
panaú	moon	totepisí	head
tiprasí	hand	monin	1
mapá	corn	nikakú	2
akup	manioc	ékemetēt	3
