= Chapacuran languages =

Endangered language family of indigenous South Americans

Chapacuran
- Chapacura–Wanham, Txapakura
- Geographic distribution: Brazil (Rondônia), Bolivia
- Linguistic classification: One of the world's primary language families
- Subdivisions: Moreic-Waric; Tapakura-Kimoka (†); Rocorona † (unclassified); Napeka † (unclassified)

Language codes
- Glottolog: chap1271
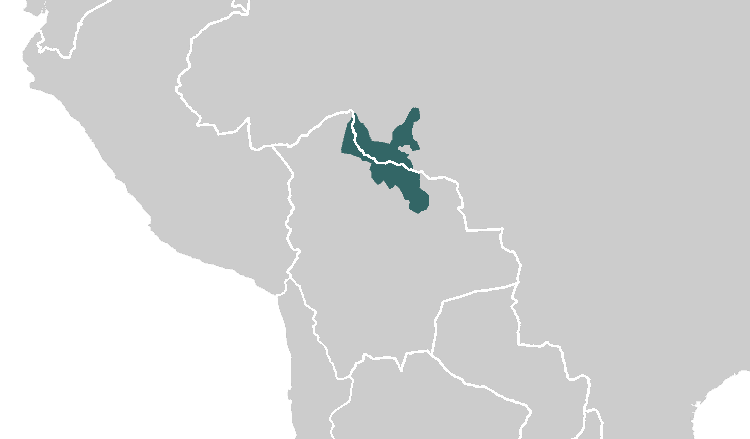
- Distribution of Chapacuran languages

The Chapacuran languages are a nearly extinct Native American language family of South America. Almost all Chapacuran languages are extinct, and the four that are extant are moribund, with the exception of Wariʼ. They are spoken in Rondônia in the southern Amazon Basin of Brazil and in northern Bolivia.

According to Kaufman (1990, 1994), the Chapacuran family could be related to the extinct Guamo language. His suggestions have not been accepted as valid by others.

== Languages ==
=== Loukotka (1968) ===
Below is a full list of Chapacuran language varieties listed by Loukotka (1968), including names of unattested varieties.

- Chapacura / Huachi / Tapacura - extinct language once spoken on the Blanco River and around Lake Chitiopa, Santa Cruz province, Bolivia.
- Moré / Itene - spoken on the Guaporé River, Azul River, and Mamoré River, Beni province, Bolivia.
- Itoreauhip - spoken between the Guaporé River and Azul River in Bolivia.
- Quitemo - once spoken on the Uruvaito River, Santa Cruz province, Bolivia.
- Nape - once spoken in the same country on Lake Chitiopa.
- Mure - once spoken on the San Martín River in Bolivia. May not be Chapacuran.
- Rocorona - once spoken on the San Martín River.
- Herisebocon - once spoken on the Rapulo River near the old mission of San Borja, Bolivia. (Unattested.) This variety was stated to be similar to Rocorona.
- Wañám / Huanyam / Pawumwa - spoken between the São Miguel River and São Domingo River, territory of Rondônia, Brazil.
- Abitana - spoken as a dialect of the Wañám language at the sources of the São Miguel River, Brazil.
- Kumana / Cautario - spoken between the Guaporé River and Cautario River, Rondônia.
- Pacahanovo / Uari Wayõ - spoken on the Pacaás Novos River, Rondônia.
- Kabixi - spoken between the São Miguel River and Preto River, Rondônia, now perhaps extinct.
- Mataua - spoken in the western area of the Cautario River. (Unattested.)
- Urunamacan - spoken to the north of the Wañám tribe, Rondônia, Brazil. (Unattested.)
- Uómo / Miguelheno - spoken on the São Miguel River. (Unattested.)
- Tapoaya - spoken by an unknown tribe at the sources of the Cautario River. (Unattested.)
- Cujuna - spoken by a very little known tribe, now perhaps extinct, to the north of the Kumaná tribe. (Unattested.)
- Urupá / Ituarupa - spoken on the Urupá River, Rondônia.
- Yarú - spoken by a few families on the Jaru River.
- Yamarú - extinct language once spoken on the Jamari River. (Unattested.)
- Torá / Tura - formerly spoken on the Marmelos River and Paricá River, state of Amazonas; now by a few individuals on the Posta Cabeça d'anta, state of Amazonas.

=== Angenot (2013) ===
List of Chapacuran languages per Angenot (2013):

Spoken in Brazil:

- Torá
- Urupá
- Jarú
- Jamará
- Oro Win
- Wariʼ (Pakaas Novos)
- Tapoaya
- Kutiana
- Matáwa (Matáma)
- Kumana (Cautario)
- Uomo
- Urunamakan
- Kujuna
- Pawumwa-Wanyam
- Abitana-Wanyam
- Kabishi-Wanyam
- Miguelenho-Wanyam

Spoken in Bolivia:

- Moré (Iten)
- Muré
- Itoreauhip
- Rokorona
- Herisobokono
- Chapakura (Huachi, Tapakura)
- Kitemoka (Kitemo)
- Napeka (Nape)
- Kusikia-Manasi

=== Birchall (2013) ===
Birchall et al. (2013) classify the dozen known Chapacuran languages as follows:

- Chapacuran
  - Kitemoka–Tapakura
    - Tapakura †
    - Kitemoka †
  - Moreic–Waric
    - Moreic–Tor
      - Nuclear More
        - Moré (90 speakers)
        - Cojubim (3 speakers)
      - Torá †
    - Waric
      - Urupa–Yaru:
        - Urupá †
        - Jarú †
      - Wanham–Wari–Oro Win
        - Wanyam †
        - Wari–Oro Win
          - Oro Win (5 speakers)
          - Wari' (2,700 speakers)
  - (position unclear) Napeka (Nape) †
  - (position unclear) Rokorona (Ocorono) †

All languages are rather closely related.

Extinct languages for which Loukotka says 'nothing' is known, but which may have been Chapacuran, include Cujuna, Mataua, Urunumacan, and Herisobocona. Similarities with Mure appear to be loans.

=== Birchall, Dunn & Greenhill (2016) ===
Birchall, Dunn & Greenhill (2016) give the following phylogenetic tree of Chapacuran, based on a computational phylogenetic analysis.

- Chapacuran
  - - Kitemoka
    - Tapakura
  - - - Torá
      - - Moré
        - Cojubim
    - - - Jarú
        - Urupá
      - - Wanyam
        - - Wari'
          - Oro Win

== Language contact ==
Jolkesky (2016) notes that there are lexical similarities with the Irantxe, Puinave-Kak, and Arawa language families due to contact.

== Phonology ==
- Languages of the Chapacuran family generally have relatively small consonant inventories and vowel inventories of average size.
- Notably, Moré, Oro Win, and Wariʼ have the rare heterorganic affricate phoneme /t̪ʙ̥/.
- Wariʼ has one of the world's most asymmetrical vowel systems, with two unrounded /i e/ and two rounded /y ø/ front vowels and two non-front /a o/ vowels. Oro Win is similar, lacking /ø/.

== Proto-language ==
Proto-Chapacuran
- Proto-Chapakura
- Reconstruction of: Chapacuran languages

=== Phonology ===
Vowels
	Front	Central	Back
Close	*i		*u
Mid	*e		*o
Open		*a	

Consonants
		Labial		Dental/ Alveolar	Palatal (-alveolar)	Velar	Glottal	
		plain	labial	Dental/ Alveolar	Palatal (-alveolar)	Velar	plain	labial
Nasal	plain	*m	*mʷ	*n	*ɲ			
Nasal	glottalic	*mˀ		*nˀ				
Plosive		*p	*pʷ	*t		*k	*ʔ	
Affricate	voiceless			*ts	*tʃ			
Affricate	voiced			*dz				
Fricative	voiceless			*s			*h	*hʷ
Fricative	voiced			*z				
Liquid	plain			*ɾ	*j	*w		
Liquid	glottalic					*wˀ		

=== Lexicon ===
Below are Proto-Chapacuran (Proto-Chapakura) reconstructions from the Diachronic Atlas of Comparative Linguistics (DiACL) online, cited from Angenot (2013). English glosses are from DiACL. For the full list of original Portuguese glosses, see the corresponding Portuguese article.

Proto-Chapacuran	English gloss	Portuguese gloss	Scientific name
*haɾam	to button		
*hoɾam	chin		
*ja:	to say, to speak		
*jaw	pillar, to grind with a stone		
*jaʔ	to bathe		
*jikat	penis		
*jowin	monkey species	macaco-prego	Sapajus
*ju:	to keep secret	seguir às escondidas	
*juk	to push, to remove		
*kamaɲ^{ʔ}	bland, without salt		
*kap	caterpillar species		
*kapam	pamonha (traditional food)		
*kaɾaʔ/*h^{w}aɾaʔ	large, fat		
*kat, *kaw^{ʔ}	river dolphin		
*kat, *ɾat	to yawn		
*katim	foot		
*katin^{ʔ}	large tick		
*kat^{ʃ}ak/*kat^{ʃ}ok	to tickle, tickling		
*kat^{ʃ}in	pineapple		
*kaw^{ʔ}	to eat		
*kawa:	tree species	árvore-rochinha	
*kawa:	kind of small arrow, used by children playing		
*kawit	parrot species	papagaio-curica	
*ked^{z}ek	to lick		
*kenum	cocoa		
*kijiʔ	to descend, to lower		
*kinam	jaguar, dog		
*kipun	tail		
*kip^{w}in	(to be) cold		
*kitam	bridge, jirau grill (Note: Jirau is a kind of indigenous frame for grilling meat or fish.)	ponte, grelha para moquear	
*kiw	to bite, to chew		
*kiwoʔ	arrow (generic)		
*koki:	piranha		
*kom	to sing (people)		
*komeN	sun		
*koɾa:	paddle		
*koɾan	palm species	palmeira-carundaí	buriti?
*kotem	red, ripe		
*kotok/*koɾok	to knock down fruits by beating the tree		
*kɾam	elbow, joint		
*kɾan	ant species	formiga-saúva	Atta
*kɾik	to see, to observe, to look		
*kɾom	to enter, inside		
*kuk	to pull, to drag		
*kun^{ʔ}	tree species	árvore-cachimbeira, jequitibá-vermelho; sal	Cariniana rubra
*kunu:	to stink, bad smell		
*kut	to pick, to catch		
*k^{w}aɾaʔ	common armadillo		
*ma(w)	to go		
*mad^{z}an	kind of yam	batata-cará	
*makiʔ	to come, to arrive		
*manaʔ	anger, brave		
*mapak	corn		
*mapaw^{ʔ}	club, baton		
*mapom	fat, grease		
*map^{w}ip	kind of small bow		
*maɾam	to paint, to write		
*mawi:	to steal, thief		
*mawin	annatto (tree species), wood for making fire		Bixa orellana
*mekuʔ	crab		
*mem	red, ripe		
*mikop	paca		
*mit^{ʃ}em	black		
*mo:	to run		
*mokon	rope, cord, string, thread		
*mom	to swell because of illness, to have a tumor		
*moɾoʔ	flour		
*mowaw^{ʔ}	tucumã palm larva	broca do tucumã	larva of Astrocaryum aculeatum
*mowin	pus, infection, tumour		
*muɾin^{ʔ}	swallow		
*m^{w}ijak	wild hog		
*n(e/o)n	to whistle with help from the hand		
*nak	to smell, to sniff		
*naɾan	pitch/tar (of jatobá tree); light	breu (de jatobá); luz	Hymenaea courbaril
*natan	face, front		
*nok	to hate, to reject		
*nok	to suckle		
*nopon	tree species	árvore-itaúba	Mezilaurus itauba
*pa:	to beat, to slap		
*pad^{z}aw	pubic hair		
*pakaʔ	red, ripe		
*pana:	tree (generic), wood, log		
*papat	bamboo species, kind of arrow, bamboo knife	taquara (esp.); flecha (esp.); faca de bambu	
*papop	wind		
*paɾV:	bow (generic)		
*patiʔ	animal (generic), fish		
*paw^{ʔ}	to tie (up)		
*paʔ	to kill, to hunt, to beat to death		
*pijeʔ	newborn child		
*pikot	giant armadillo	tatu gigante	
*pipon	bird species	cujubim	Pipile cujubi
*piɾam^{ʔ}	squirrel	quoati-puru, esquilo	
*pit^{ʃ}ak	to scratch, to itch		
*pit^{ʃ}i:	horn		
*piwan	tarantula	aranha caranguejeira	
*piʔ	to dance		
*pok	thigh, upper leg		
*pon	to fart		
*pot	to pull out		
*pot	to get, to tear, to extract		
*pot^{ʃ}	to cook; to spit	cozinhar; cuspir	
*poʔ	to wake up, to rouse		
*pɾin	parakeet		
*pɾu:	to kill, to hit a target with an arrow		
*pu:	to blow, to light a fire		
*puɾek	to miss the target with an arrow		
*p^{w}e:	to sit		
*p^{w}ikun	stone, rock		
*p^{w}in	to leave behind		
*p^{w}iɾan	boa		
*p^{w}it	to break, to cut, to extract, to unrip		
*p^{w}iti:	large horsefly		
*p^{w}it^{s}i:	palm species	palmeira-totai	Acrocomia aculeata subsp. totai
*p^{w}it^{s}op	porcupine, hedgehog		
*p^{w}iw	flower		
*ɾi:(tan)	banana (generic)		
*tajin	charcoal		
*takat	wax (honey, ear, for arrow, etc.)		
*takaw^{ʔ}	kind of fish	peixe-cará	Geophagus brasiliensis
*takiʔ	to fly, to leave flying		
*tan	leaf, one		
*tapan	monkey species	macaco-saguim	Callitrichidae; Callithrix jacchus
*tapiw	agouti		
*tapot	straw, cover/roofing of house		
*tata:	father (1SG.POSS)		
*tataw	rope made of tree fibers; horn	envira (esp.); chifre	
*tat^{s}am	to laugh, to smile		
*tat^{ʃ}iʔ	husband		
*tawan	lazy, sulky, disobedient		
*tawi:	bee (generic), honey		
*tawit	fence, surrounded		
*taʔ	to cut		
*tikat	to finish		
*tim	heart		
*tipan	arm		
*tipat	wing		
*tipoʔ	to follow a trail		
*titim^{ʔ}/*tiɾim^{ʔ}	to lie down		
*tok	to drink		
*tok	eye, grain, seed, stone		
*toke:	chestnut, Brazil nut		
*tom	to burn, black		
*tomiʔ	to say, to speak		
*ton	to knock down fruits by beating the tree		
*top	to explode, to break corn		
*topak	mouth, lips, to speak		
*topan	skin, peel, bark		
*topop	basket (generic)		
*toɾo:	to swell, to ferment, to cause swelling		
*tot^{ʃ}am	clay		
*tot^{ʃ}ik	bee species, honey	abelha-lambeolho; seu mel	Leurotrigona muelleri
*towa:	turtle, tortoise; rubber cylinder (?)	tartaruga, tracaja, jabuti; tambor de caucho	
*towan	kind of fruit	fruta-murisi	Byrsonima crassifolia
*towaʔ	white, bright color, daybreak/dawn		
*towin	parrot species	papagaio-curica	
*toʔ	to beat, to open, to crack, to cut		
*tɾakom	bamboo, taboca (bamboo species)	bambu; taboca	Guadua weberbaueri
*tɾakop	fermented drink		
*tɾamaʔ	man		
*tɾam^{w}in	red macaw		
*tɾan tɾan	guan bird	jacu	Penelope
*tɾapo:	white hair		
*tɾawan	liver; palm species, fish species	fígado; palmeira-patua; patua; surubim	Pimelodidae
*tɾik	coal, ember		
*tɾot	aricuri palm leaf		Syagrus coronata
*t^{ʃ}ak	to suck on a fruit		
*t^{ʃ}ek	day		
*t^{ʃ}ijat	net		
*t^{ʃ}ik	one		
*t^{ʃ}ikin^{ʔ}	nail, claw; traíra (fish species)	unha, garra; traíra (peixe)	Erythrinidae
*t^{ʃ}in	to throw		
*t^{ʃ}itot	country, to plant		
*t^{ʃ}iw	(to be) cold		
*t^{ʃ}ok	to suck "noisily", to make a "sucking" sound		
*t^{ʃ}om	to step; to insist	pisar, bater o pé	
*t^{ʃ}opin	to spit		
*t^{ʃ}oraw	swallow		
*t^{ʃ}owiʔ	rain, winter		
*t^{ʃ}up	to kiss "noisily"		
*tun	hair, coat		
*tut	to walk		
*wak	to add, to pile up		
*waki:	toad species		
*wan	to copulate, to have sex		
*wana:	way, path, road		
*waɲam	Indian of enemy tribe		
*waɾak	sap, sperm, vaginal secretion		
*watam	kind of fruit		
*wat^{ʃ}ik	common opossum	mucura	Didelphis marsupialis
*wet	to marry		
*weʔ	to vomit		
*wijak	to scrape with a knife		
*wijam	small		
*wina:	to raise an animal, to tame/domesticate		
*wina:	grandson		
*winim^{ʔ}	to wait, to except		
*wit^{ʃ}iʔ	to roast on coal/ember		
*ʔajiʔ	older brother		
*ʔaka:	to sing (of bird), to cackle, to cry		
*ʔakom	water; river; rain		
*ʔakop	manioc, cassava		
*ʔam	edge, margin		
*ʔamiʔ	to give		
*ʔamon	excrements, feces, intestines, belly		
*ʔam^{w}i:	very, much		
*ʔaɲ	to cry		
*ʔanin	younger sister		
*ʔapa:	palm species	palmeira-marayau	Bactris major
*ʔapam	shoulder		
*ʔapan	kind of fruit		
*ʔapaʔ	maternal grandmother		
*ʔapi:	thorn, needle, hook		
*ʔapi:	father-in-law		
*ʔapiʔ	to finish		
*ʔapo:	uncle (aunt's husband)		
*ʔapop	caiman	jacaré	
*ʔatat	bone, leg		
*ʔataw/*ʔaɾaw	back, shoulders		
*ʔatin	younger brother		
*ʔatɾim	house, traditional village (maloca)		
*ʔat^{ʃ}aʔ	younger sibling		
*ʔat^{ʃ}em	to sneeze		
*ʔaw	to spill liquid, to bleed, to leak, to drain, to drip		
*ʔawan	bitter		
*ʔawan	tree species with venomous bark		
*ʔawan	pig, hog, capybara		
*ʔawi:	good, beautiful, tasty		
*ʔawik	blood		
*ʔawin	sky, height, to charge upwards		
*ʔawom	cotton; clothes; dove/pigeon species	algodão; roupa; pomba (esp.)	
*ʔawum	2SG		
*ʔenem	brother-in-law (sister's husband)		
*ʔep	pillar, to grind with a stone		
*ʔeɾum	trumpeter (bird species)	jacamim	Psophia
*ʔew	burn		
*ʔewu:	toucan		
*ʔih^{w}am	fish (generic)		
*ʔijat	tooth, beak		
*ʔijaʔ	vessel made of palm	vasilha feita de cacho de palmeira	
*ʔijew^{ʔ}	paternal grandfather		
*ʔiji:	palm species	palmeira-bacaba	Oenocarpus bacaba
*ʔijin^{ʔ}	fear, to fear		
*ʔijoʔ	to put out, to erase		
*ʔikan	kind of mosquito	mosquito-catoqui	
*ʔikat	medicine man, sorcerer		
*ʔikat	to break		
*ʔikim	chest, thorax		
*ʔikit	knife, iron instrument		
*ʔiman	hole, vagina		
*ʔimiʔ	kind of mosquito or fly	pium, borrachudo	Simuliidae
*ʔim^{w}in^{ʔ}	tapir		
*ʔim^{w}iʔ	to die, dead		
*ʔinam^{ʔ}	pregnant		
*ʔinaw^{ʔ}	bat		
*ʔinaʔ	mother		
*ʔipa:	to open (eyes, door)		
*ʔipan	to fall, to be born		
*ʔipik	latex, rubber	seringa; borracha	
*ʔip^{w}ik	anteater species	tamanduá-mirim	Tamandua tetradactyla
*ʔiɾam	açaí palm	palmeira-açai	
*ʔiɾiʔ	(to be) right, truth		
*ʔit	body		
*ʔitak	to swallow		
*ʔitaʔ/*ʔiɾaʔ	to urinate		
*ʔite:	father (1SG.POSS)		
*ʔit^{ʃ}e:	fire, firewood		
*ʔit^{s}im	night		
*ʔit^{ʃ}in	centipede, millipede		
*ʔiw^{ʔ}	louse		
*ʔiwan	to get home		
*ʔiwi:	mat		
*ʔiwiʔ	smoke		
*ʔod^{z}ip	palm species	palmeira-najá	Attalea maripa
*ʔojam	spirit, soul of a corpse		
*ʔojop	pacu (fish species)		
*ʔokin	scorpion		
*ʔokon	palm species	palmeira-real / buriti	Mauritia flexuosa
*ʔomaʔ	to live, to have, to exist		
*ʔomi:	scrubland, bush, firm land		
*ʔon	to whistle without help from the hand		
*ʔonaɲ	palm species	palmeira-buruburu	Astrocaryum murumuru
*ʔonok	navel, belly button		
*ʔop	to dance		
*ʔopaʔ	bagre (fish species)	bagre	
*ʔopi:	woodworm/beetle species	caruncho rola-bosta; besouro (esp.)	
*ʔopot	kind of liana used for binding	cipó-ambé, usado para amarrar	
*ʔoɾam	cheek		
*ʔoraw^{ʔ}	mushroom species		
*ʔoro:	people of, clan of, kind of		
*ʔoɾom	gourd, calabash		
*ʔoɾot	to break out (2nd permanent tooth of a child)		
*ʔotin	curassow (bird species)	mutum	Cracidae
*ʔoto:	gourd, calabash		
*ʔot^{s}iw	monkey species	macaco-de-cheiro amarelo	Saimiri
*ʔowam	kind of fish	peixe-jeju	Hoplerythrinus unitaeniatus
*ʔowit	wart		
*ʔoβi:	anum (bird species)		Crotophaga
*ʔukun	flesh (of the body), body		
*ʔum	hand		
*ʔum^{w}e:	bird (generic)		
*ʔup^{w}ek	head		
*ʔup^{w}eɲ	to sleep		
*ʔuɾin	ant species	formiga-da-castanha	
*ʔutuɾ	nose		
*ʔutut	urine		
*ʔuwe:	older sister		
*ʔuwew	paternal grandmother		
*ʔuwit	name		
*ʔuʔ	ant species	formiga-saraça	

== Bibliography ==
- Angenot, Geralda de Lima Vitor (2013-08-23). "Fonotática e fonologia do lexema protochapakura". Revista Eletrônica Língua Viva (in Brazilian Portuguese). 3 (1): 31–37. ISSN 2237-9800.
- Birchall, Joshua; Dunn, Michael; Greenhill, Simon (2013). An internal classification of the Chapacuran language family. SSILA 2013 Meeting. Boston. p. 22.
- Birchall, Joshua; Dunn, Michael; Greenhill, Simon J. (2016). "A Combined Comparative and Phylogenetic Analysis of the Chapacuran Language Family". International Journal of American Linguistics. 82 (3): 255–284. doi:10.1086/687383. hdl:2066/166431. ISSN 0020-7071.
- Campbell, Lyle (2012-01-13). "Classification of the indigenous languages of South America". In Campbell, Lyle; Grondona, Verónica (eds.). The Indigenous Languages of South America. DE GRUYTER. pp. 59–166. doi:10.1515/9783110258035.59. ISBN 978-3-11-025513-3.
- Hammarström, Harald; Forke, Robert; Haspelmath, Martin; Bank, Sebastian (2020). "Chapacuran". Glottolog 4.3.
- Jolkesky, Marcelo Pinho de Valhery (2016). Estudo arqueo-ecolinguístico das terras tropicais sul-americanas (Ph.D. dissertation) (2 ed.). Brasília: University of Brasília.
- Kaufman, Terrence (1990). "Language History in South America: What we know and how to know more". In David L. Payne (ed.). Amazonian Linguistics. Austin: University of Texas Press.
- Loukotka, Čestmír (1968). Classification of South American Indian languages. Los Angeles: UCLA Latin American Center.
- Moseley, Christopher; Asher, R. E.; Tait, Mary (1994). Atlas of the world's languages. London; New York: Routledge. ISBN 978-0-415-01925-5.
- Steward, Julian H., ed. (1946). Handbook of South American Indians. Smithsonian Institution, Bureau of American Ethnology, Bulletin 143. Vol. 3. Washington, D.C.: United States Government Printing Office. pp. xxvi+986+126 plates.
