= Torá language =

Chapacuran language formerly spoken in Brazil

Torá
- Native to: Brazil
- Region: Dos Marmelos River
- Ethnicity: 330 Torá (2014)
- Extinct: early 2000s "few" semispeakers (2018)
- Language family: Chapacuran: Moreic-Waric; Moreic-Tor; Torá

Language codes
- ISO 639-3: trz
- Glottolog: tora1263
- ELP: Torá
- Torá is classified as Extinct by the UNESCO Atlas of the World's Languages in Danger.

Torá is an extinct Chapacuran language that was once spoken along the lower stretches of the Marmelos River in Brazil. Only a few people were reported to remember a few words in the language as of 2018, although the Torá people have interest in the revival of their language. The only documentation was made in the 1920s by the German-Brazilian ethnologist Curt Nimuendajú and the Brazilian engineer Euclydes Henrique do Valle Bentes, totaling about 670 vocabulary items, phrases, and sentences.

== History ==
The last fluent speaker is believed to have died in the 2000s. In 2006, there were two fluent speakers left, but it only had semi-speakers as of 2018—"at least a few". In 2018, only a few words of the language had been preserved by the community.

=== Documentation ===
It is known only from a wordlist recorded by Nimuendajú and Valle Bentes in 1921 and 1922 and published in 1922 and 1925. The total corpus of Torá materials totals around 670 words, phrases, and sentences.

== Revival ==
The Torá have expressed interest in reviving their language. According to Stan Anonby (2018), "there was some talk of revitalizing the language, but no one seemed to have enough memory of Torá to get anywhere with the idea".

== Phonology ==
=== Vowels ===
Synclair (2026) posits a five-vowel system for Torá:

	Front	Central	Back
High	i		u
Mid	e		o
Low		a	

/e/ appears in the data as either [e] or [ɛ], the former being more common. Similarly, /u/ is attested phonetically as either [u], the more common realization, or as [ʊ].

==== Vowel harmony ====
Some vowel harmony processes may be identified in Torá, namely an alternation between /o/ and /u/.

tok
eye
'eye'

tu̥kú
tuk-u
eye-1SG
'my eye'

It could thus be concluded that /o/ and /u/ belong to different vowel classes in Torá, though the evidence is insufficient to obtain a clearer picture; for example, vowel harmony processes could be unproductive and fossilized in certain paradigms, or only applicable to /o/ and /u/.

=== Consonants ===
14 total consonants are considered phonemic by Synclair (2026).

		Labial	Alveolar	Alveopalatal	Palatal	Velar	Glottal
Plosive		p	t			k	ʔ
Fricative	voiceless		s	ʃ			h
Fricative	voiced		z				
Nasal		m	n		ɲ		
Liquid		w	ɾ		j		

==== Oral stops ====
/p/ appears variably as either [p] or [b], the latter almost exclusively occurring in pap, the 3rd person plural particle, and pa, the oblique, also sometimes realized as [p] in the same words.

itera bap nu
iteɾa pap nu
good 3PL 3M
'they are good'

kaa no ba hi̩i
ka no ba hḭi
ka no pa hiʔiʔ
NEG 3M OBL here
'he is not here'

/t/ is also attested as either [t] or [d], though there are no conditioning factors identified for the differing distribution of the two realizations.

teaku ku dikat
{te a-ku} ku tikat
{INT N(?)-3M} 3M do
'what is he doing?'

/k/ also occurs in the forms [k] and [g], the latter most commonly in the initial position in grammatical words, particularly demonstrative pronouns, though [k] is also found in the same position in these words.

maago wayódn gwã
{ma ɡo} {wa ˈjoᵈn} ɡwã
{ma ko} {wa jon} kwa
{go 3M} {house 3M.POSS} DEM.M
'he goes to that guy’s house'

kwã terādnu
kwã {teɾa ᵈnu}
kwa {iteɾa nu}
DEM.M {good 3M}
'he is good'

However, it is impossible to determine whether Nimuendajú found the voicing of the three stops ambiguous "with a voicing onset somewhere between what he would hear as voiced or voiceless".

==== Glottal stop ====
The glottal stop and glottalization in Torá are somewhat ambiguous; it is "unclear whether the glottal stop was overtly articulated". Synclair (2026) believes Nimuendajú's "guttural" vowels to represent glottalization, and transcribes them as laryngealized. "Guttural" vowels "occur word-finally or preceding consonants such as nasals, fricatives, and stops". In other Chapacuran languages, however, glottal stops cannot occur before other consonants, though in some instances they may follow certain sonorants, including post-glottalized nasals and a post-glottalized ⟨w'⟩ in Kujubim. However, in closely related Moré, vowels may be laryngealized in a word with a final glottal stop. As a consequence, Synclair treats words with a "guttural" vowel as having a word-final glottal stop.

==== Fricatives ====
/s/, despite contrasting phonemically with /z/, has been shown in a single instance to be seemingly voiced intervocalically to [z].

nakaseti non kau wati
nakaseti non kau wati
nakaseti n-on kaw wati
uncontacted.people 3NFUT-3M eat people
'the wild Indians eat people'

nakazetí
nakazeˈti
nakaseti
uncontacted.people
'wild Indian'

/z/ has the variant form [ʒ], appearing in only two instances: [ꞵiʒimop] 'brocket deer', and once in the form for the 1st person singular emphatic pronoun waža. All other instances of the latter appear as waza.

waža mārábm
waʒa {ma aˈɾaᵇm}
waza {ma aɾ-am}
1SG {go 2SG.FUT-???}
'I am going'

waza baki̩ mārábm
waza baˈki {ma aˈɾaᵇm}
waza paki {ma aɾ-am}
1SG also {go 2SG.FUT-???}
'I am going too'

/ʃ/ can be realized as [ʃ, t͡ʃ, x, ç, s]. [ç] (Synclair's interpretation of Nimuendajú's ⟨x̣⟩) is only found in the data four times, three times in the repeated word [iˈçɛ] 'fire' and once in [awaˈçi] 'arrow', and [x] (the interpretation of Nimuendajú's ⟨x⟩) just three times, in [awaˈxi] 'arrow', [toˈxop] 'basket', and [kiˈxo] 'taboca flute'. /h/ has no attested variation in the data and is found only in the onset of a syllable.

== Morphosyntax ==
=== Word order ===
Like its relatives in the Chapacuran family, Torá exhibits verb–object–subject word order.

=== Alignment ===
Torá is a nominative–accusative language.
