= Napeca language =

Extinct Chapacuran language of South America

Napeca
- Nape, Napeka
- Native to: Bolivia
- Region: Bolivia–Brazil border area
- Ethnicity: Napeca
- Extinct: after 1965 unknown rememberers (2013)
- Language family: Chapacuran: Tapakuric; Kitemoka–Napeka; Napeca

Language codes
- ISO 639-3: None (mis)
- Glottolog: nape1237

Napeca (Nape, Napeka) is an extinct Chapacuran language. The Napeca people were said to have spoken the same language as those who spoke Quitemoca, and is thought to be a dialect of the same language as Quitemoca. Jürgen Riester documented the language in the 1960s, and recorded some samples.

== Morphology ==
=== Pronouns ===
Napeka pronouns
Napeka	Gloss
huaľa	1SG
abum	2SG
arikó	3SG
huaľa	1PL
ariko-roma	2SG
ariko	3PL

=== Adjectives ===
The suffix -ya is sometimes attached after an adjective to indicate the first person singular (e.g. nahuiza-ya 'I am well', literally "healthy-I"); the same construction is present for the second person singular (e.g. nauiza-bum 'you are well', literally "healthy-you").

=== Negation ===
Negation is expressed in Napeka by the infix -za-.

Napeka	Gloss	Napeka	Gloss
mbeb-ya	I go	mbeb-za-ya	I do not go
urupa-yapae tomima	I understand your language	aipíi-za-yapae tomima	I do not understand your language

== Vocabulary ==
Napeka vocabulary
Napeka	Gloss
miya	no
homa, emme	there is
kammiya	there is not
kiñam	jaguar
ako	water
isze	fire
kotkot	chicha
mapiitio	sun
činmak	earth

== Sample phrases ==
Napeka phrases
Napeka	Gloss
či-aguîn	in the sky/in heaven
birita	this morning
xupini akkom	it is raining
pixiumhará	sit down
imačitiakom tete aiči	I like God
birita mbebya	I went this morning
pitiama mbeb-ta-ya	I will go tomorrow
huaľa čiaguin huaľa-yukon tete aiči	I will go to heaven with God
kamma	Go!
kamma iguirayum, makipi pitiapara	Go to your house and return quickly
maľa mauma	Where are you going?
maia-ñipa apakka	let's get out of here
kači-bi čuyum	What is your name?
homa te aiči	Is there a God?
kači bubiroma	What are you looking for?
tete aiči homa či-aiguîn	God is in heaven
kači amatutumpa abín činmak	Who created heaven and the earth?
imačitiapae bikači	I want a knife
tete aiči amatutumpa	God created it
maya homako tete aiči	Where is God?
kači totomima huakaiña	What are you saying?
paniapat mmoko tete ayu	My father died yesterday
nauizabum	How are you?
kači imačitma	What do you want?
xurua apiakon kiñam čiñomiu	I killed a jaguar with the arrow
imačitiakon ixam	I want some fish
