= Wariʼ language =

Chapacuran language of Brazil and Bolivia

Wariʼ
- Pakaás Novos
- wariʼ
- Pronunciation: [ʔwariʔ]
- Native to: Brazil
- Region: Rondônia
- Ethnicity: Wariʼ people
- Native speakers: 2,700 (2006)
- Language family: Chapacuran: Waric; Wanyam–Oro Win–Wari’; Oro Win–Wari’; Wariʼ
- Dialects: Northern; Wari’-’Oro Waram Wari’-’Oro Mon Wari’-’Oro Waram Xijen: Southern; Wari’-’Oro Não’ Wari’-’Oro ’Eo Wari’-’Oro ’At Wari’-’Oro Jowin Wari’-’Oro Kao Oro Aje
- Writing system: Latin

Language codes
- ISO 639-3: pav
- Glottolog: wari1268
- ELP: Wari'
- Wari is classified as Endangered by the UNESCO Atlas of the World's Languages in Danger.

The Wariʼ language (also Orowari, Wari, Pacaá Novo, Pacaás Novos, Pakaa Nova, Pakaásnovos) is the sole remaining vibrant language of the Chapacuran language family of the Brazilian–Bolivian border region of the Amazon. It has about 2,700 speakers of the Wariʼ people, who live along tributaries of the Pacaas Novos river in Western Brazil. The word wariʼ means "we!" in the Wariʼ language and is the term given to the language and tribe by its speakers. Wariʼ is written in the Latin script.

== Dialects ==
Wariʼ dialects listed by Angenot (1997):

Northern dialects

- Wari’-’Oro Waram 'the waram monkeys'
- Wari’-’Oro Mon 'the feces'
- Wari’-’Oro Waram Xijen 'the other waram monkeys'

Southern dialects

- Wari’-’Oro Não’ 'the bats'
- Wari’-’Oro ’Eo 'the burpers'
- Wari’-’Oro ’At 'the bones'
- Wari’-’Oro Jowin 'the jowin monkeys'
- Wari’-’Oro Kao Oro Aje 'the eaters of green things'

== Phonology ==
None of the segments described below only occur in borrowed words or only in specific word classes. There are some sounds not listed which are only used in onomatopoeia and can violate the usual phonotactic and phonological constraints.

=== Consonants ===
The ’Oro Nao’ dialect of Wariʼ as described by Everett & Kern (1997) has the following consonant phonemes. It is a relatively large inventory by Lowland Amazonian standards. The angled brackets represent the spellings associated with each sound.

		Bilabial	Dental/ Alveolar	Palatal (-alveolar)	Velar	Glottal
Nasal		m ⟨m⟩	n ⟨n⟩			
Plosive/ Affricate	plain	p ⟨p⟩	t ⟨t⟩	t͡ʃ ⟨x⟩	k ⟨c, qu⟩	ʔ ⟨'⟩
Plosive/ Affricate	labial		t̪͡ʙ̥ ⟨t⟩		kʷ ⟨cw⟩	
Continuant	plain		ɾ ⟨r⟩	j ⟨j⟩		h ⟨h⟩
Continuant	labial				w ⟨w⟩	hʷ ⟨hw⟩

/t̪͡ʙ̥/ is made up of a bilabial trill preceded by a dental stop. In ’Oro Não’, this sound only occurs before /o/ and /y/, appears almost exclusively in older speakers, and is sometimes allophonic with [t], being entirely replaced by [t] in some idiolects. In some dialects it is a separate phoneme; however, only about 24 words contain the sound, some of which are onomatopoeic.

==== Consonant alternations ====
- [t͡ʃ] can become [ʃ], with a tendency to surface as [ʃ] more before unrounded vowels than rounded ones.
  xaxi' na 'he is thin' can be [t͡ʃaˈt͡ʃiʔ na] or [ʃaˈʃiʔ na].
- [m] can become [mᵇ] (a sequence of the bilabial nasal followed by the voiced bilabial stop) syllable initially, most frequently before /a/} but also before other vowels. The tendency to realise it as a sequence is greater if the syllable is stressed.
  homiri 'its filth' can be [homiˈɾi] or [homᵇiˈɾi].
- [n] can become [nᵈ] (a sequence of the voiced alveolar nasal followed the voiced alveolar stop) syllable initially, most frequently before /a/ but also before other vowels. The tendency to realise it as a sequence is greater if the syllable is stressed.
  wina 'my head' can be [wiˈna] or [wiˈnᵈa].
- [j] can become [ʒ] before /i/.
  maji 'let's go!' can be [maˈji] or [maˈʒi].
- [ʔj] can become [ʔd͡ʒ] word initially.
  jin' 'ina 'I am afraid' can be [ˈʔjinʔ ʔiˌna] or [ˈʔd͡ʒinʔ ʔiˌna].

=== Vowels ===
Wariʼ has one of the world's most asymmetrical vowel systems. Vowels are generally expected to be somewhat evenly distributed in the vowel space, not bunched into a corner. Additionally, vowels are expected to be unrounded when front and rounded when back until "gaps" in the vowel systems have been filled. Although Wariʼ has only six vowels, four of these are close/close-mid front vowels, of which two are rounded (although /ø/ is uncommon). Non-native speakers have marked difficulty in distinguishing these front vowels, that contrast with only a single back vowel /o/.

	Front		Central	Back
	unr.	rnd.	Central	Back
Close	i ⟨i⟩	y ⟨u⟩		
Close-mid	e ⟨e⟩	ø ⟨ö⟩		o ⟨o⟩
Open			a ⟨a⟩	

Vowel nasalisation occurs on diphthongs only; the few which are not nasalised all end in /i/. The following diphthongs occur in the Oro Nao dialect: [ẽĩ], [ãĩ], [aɪ], [õĩ], [oɪ], [ỹĩ], [ĩõ], [ẽõ], [ãõ].

==== Vowel alternations ====
- [i] can become [ɪ] in unstressed syllables if the vowel in the following syllable is [i].
  'it is rocking' piquirim na can be [pikiˈɾim na] or [pɪkɪˈɾim na].
- /e/ becomes [ɛ] before all stops other than [ʔ], and in unstressed syllables in harmony with /e/ becoming [ɛ] in the stressed syllable.
  'day' xec is [t͡ʃɛk] because of the [k]
  'they went out' hwerehwet mama' nana is [hʷɛɾɛˌhʷɛt maˈmaʔ naˌna] because the [t] in the stressed syllable causes /e/ to become [ɛ] and the preceding ones change in harmony.
- /e/ becomes [ɪ] before nasals, and in harmony with a /e/ becoming [ɪ] in the stressed syllable.
  'it is numb' teteren na is [tɪtɪˈɾɪn na].
- [o] can become [ʊ] in unstressed syllables when the vowel in the stressed syllable is not [o].
  'its seed' tocoi can be [toˈkʷi] or [tʊˈkʷi].
- [ø] is a rare segment and for some speakers is evolving into [e] in open syllables and [y] in closed ones.

=== Syllables ===
The basic syllable in Wari' is CV(C)(C), but suffixes can be of the form VC, VCVC or V. Only stops and nasals can occur in syllable codas. Consonant clusters are rare: /n/ is the only first segment found, and /t/, /k/ and /t͡ʃ/ are the only second segments found in non-compound words.

Wariʼ has words ending in the consonant clusters /mʔ/ and /nʔ/. These have been analysed as single sounds, but apparently only to avoid complicating syllable structure. If these are separate phonemes, these clusters only occur word finally.

In the Oro Nao dialect, many consonants alternate with [ʔC] at the beginning of monosyllabic words, and [ʔ] always precedes word initial semivowels ([j] and [w]), including in polysyllabic words. There is a correlation between words that begin [ʔC] in Oro Nao and words that begin [ʔaC] in other dialects. For example, 'water' is ⟨com⟩ [ʔkom] in Oro Nao and ⟨'acom⟩ [ʔaˈkom] in other dialects. Loss of this initial syllable is a potential explanation of why these words have variants that break the phonotactic rules. However, these generalisations do not always hold; for instance 'thorn' ⟨pi⟩ [ʔpi] is pronounced the same in all dialects.

=== Stress ===
The final syllable of words in major lexical categories is stressed. The verb tends to take the primary stress, with secondary stress on the others. However, emphasis of a particular word can cause transfer of the primary stress.

== Morphology ==
Wariʼ is a largely analytic language, which has almost no verbal inflection but many derivational processes.

=== Possession ===
Wariʼ has two main classes of nouns:

1. xiʼ nouns (named as such because their citation form ends with the suffix /-xiʼ/)
2. non-xiʼ nouns

Xiʼ nouns are inalienably possessed, and therefore have a paradigm of possession marking suffixes.

		Singular	Plural
1st person	Exclusive	-Ø	-xut
1st person	Inclusive	-Ø	-xiʼ
2nd person		-m	-huʼ
3rd person	Masculine	-con	-cocon
3rd person	Feminine	-cam	-camam
3rd person	Neuter	-in (only nouns referring to humans trigger number agreement)	

Some forms have allomorphs, especially when following stems that ends in the vowel [e], for instance -con becomes -cun and -cam becomes -quem.

There is also a paradigm of nominal inflectional clitics that inflect for person, number and third person gender. These are used to show possession of a non-xiʼ noun.

		Singular	Plural
1st person	Exclusive	ne	nuxut
1st person	Inclusive	ne	nexiʼ
2nd person		nem	nuhuʼ
3rd person	Masculine	nucun	nucucun
3rd person	Feminine	nequem	nequequem
3rd person	Neuter	nein	

Most xiʼ nouns have alternate forms which cannot be possessed. To signify possession of these forms, the inalienable xiʼ counterparts must be used. For example, to convey the meaning 'his bone or leg', the xiʼ form of the noun (araxiʼ) with the third person masculine singular ending must be used. The nonpossessed form of the noun ('at) cannot be used with the third person masculine singular nominal inflectional clitic.

'aracon
bone-3S.M
'his bone or leg'

*'at nucun
bone POSS:3S.M
'his bone or leg'

=== Reduplication ===
==== Verbs ====
There is no affixation at all on verbs, but reduplication is used to mark aspect. Plural forms are derived by partial reduplication of the CV from the stressed syllable. This can either be a CV(CV) pattern, (where the second is optional) usually for transitive verbs: wac 'cut', wawac 'cut' (plural); cao' 'eat', cacacao' 'eat' (plural). A CVrV pattern is usually used for intransitive verbs: cat 'break' (intr), caracat 'break' (plural). About a third of plural forms are derived by each of these types of reduplication, and the final third by suppletion.

==== Nouns ====
Reduplication of nouns can derive names or descriptive terms. Thus capija capija (mouth-1S) means 'talker', and towira towira (testicles-1S) means 'legendary character who has enlarged testicles'.

=== Clitics ===
Wariʼ has both verbal and nominal inflectional clitics, which are analysed as such and not affixes for a few reasons. Verbal inflectional clitics can occur as whole utterances as responses, as the referent is clear from the previous statement. They also do not undergo the phonological processes that is expected if they were suffixes to the main verb, for instance they do not take the primary stress, which the possessive suffixes do when they attach to xiʼ nouns.

Verbal inflectional clitics are inflected for person, number, tense, third person gender (only if tenseless), voice, and contain both the subject and the object of the verb. Where there is more than one object, the clitic represents one object based on the semantic roles present in the following hierarchy:

GOAL>CIRCUMSTANCE>THEME>BENEFACTIVE>COMITATIVE>LOCATION>TIME.

=== Morphophonological processes ===
Wariʼ has three types of assimilatory process – regressive (or anticipatory), progressive (or preservative) and coalescent. This mainly occurs across word-initial morpheme boundaries.

Regressive assimilation occurs at morpheme boundaries involving consonants, where the consonant of the suffix causes a change in the consonant of the stem. This happens when xiʼ nouns with stems that end in -ji inflect for third person masculine or feminine, as the /k/ in the suffix causes the /y/ in the stem to become /ts/:

taraji- + -con = taraxicon
ear {} 3S.M {} {his ear}

Progressive assimilation occurs over morpheme boundaries between nasal consonants or diphthongs and voiceless stops. This type of assimilation is optional but common in normal speech, however does not seem to appear in careful speech: Mon te? 'Where is my father?' can be pronounced as either [mon'de] or [mon'te].

Coalescence is the most common assimilatory process, which is often accompanied by regressive vowel harmony. There are three principles which guide the output of vowel coalescence.

1. If one of the two vowels is a back vowel, the output vowel will be a back vowel: xiri- 'house' + -u '1S' = xuru 'my house'
2. The output vowel will have the height of the highest vowel of the two input vowels: toco- 'eye' + -um '2S' = tucum 'their eyes'
3. If the input vowels are identical, the output vowel is identical (this only occurs with /i/+/i/ in the corpus collected by Everett and Kern (1997)).

== Syntax ==
Basic constituent order in Wariʼ is deemed to be VOS, although it is uncommon to have multiple expressed constituents. Often arguments to the verb are indicated by the agreement affixes which form the verbal inflectional clitics, where the subject affix precedes the one for the object. A third person object or subject can either be overtly marked or just referenced in the inflectional clitic, first and second person can only be marked by the clitic.

Mao na.
go:S 3S:RPP
'He went.'

Mao na Orowao.
go:S 3S:RPP M:name
'Orowao went.'

Mao 'ina.
go:S 1S:RPP
'I went.'

*Mao 'ina wata'.
go:S 1S:RPP EMPH:1S
'I went.'

A verb can have up to four arguments, but it is uncommon to express more than one at a time. Instances of three or more arguments being expressed usually only come from elicited examples.

=== COMP sentences ===
COMP sentences are referred to as such by Everett and Kern (1997) because their initial position is occupied by what they refer to as a COMP or complementizer word. These give the sentence – or a variable in the sentence – a particular interpretation.

For a sentence to be a COMP sentence, it must have a COMP word in the initial position, an inflectional morpheme closely following which gives information about tense, mood, and sometimes gender, and a tenseless verbal inflectional clitic following the verb.

Here is a list of the COMP words found in the Oro Nao dialect.

COMP word	Morphological composition	Function	Example sentence
ma'	demonstrative 'that:PROX:hearer'	interrogation	Ma' co tomi' na? COMP INFL:MF:RPP speak 3S:RPP 'Who is speaking?'
mon	ma'+-on '3S.M object'	interrogation (masculine)	Mon tarama' co mao nain Guajará? COMP man INFL:MF:RPP go:S 3S:RPP-3N place:name 'Which man went to Guajará?'
mam	ma'+-m '3S.F object'	interrogation (feminine)	Mam narima' co xain na? COMP woman INFL:MF:RPP hot 3S:RPP 'Which woman has a fever?'
main	ma'+-in '3N object'	interrogation (neuter)	Main ca mao ca? COMP INFL:NRPP go:S 3S.M 'Where did he go?'
'om	verb 'to not exist'	negation	'Om ca mao ca. COMP INFL:NRPP go:S 3S.M 'He did not go.'
mo	verb 'list presentation'	condition	Mo xi pi'am cacama. COMP INFL:IRR sleep 3P.F 'If they slept...'
'ac	preverbal modifier 'like'	indication of resemblance	'Ac ca mao cama na. COMP INFL:NRPP go:S 3S.F 3S:RPP 'It seems like she went?'
je	emphatic pronoun '3N'	affirmation/interrogation	Je 'i ca' ca tomi' cocon Xijam. COMP N this:N INFL:NRPP speak 3S.M-3P.M M:name 'This is what Xijam said to them.'
'ane	verb 'to be different'	contraexpectation	'Ane ca wari' 'iri' ca' ne. COMP INFL:NRPP person 1P.INCL this:N REC:PAST 'But/because we are people (Indians).'
cain'	demonstrative 'that neuter distal'	interrogation	Cain' ca tomi' cama? COMP INFL:NRPP speak 3S.F 'What did she say?'
pain	prepostition '3N'	subordination	Tomi' xaxa' 'urut pain ca cono' cacama xuruxut pane. speak distractedly 1P.EXCL:RPP COMP INFL:NRPP die:P 3P.F siblings-1P.EXCL REM:PAST 'We are sad because our brothers died.'

=== Copular sentences ===
Wariʼ does not have a copula verb, so sentences that would use this instead have what would be the adjective become the verb.

Tamara' na' pije'.
man 3S:RPP child
‘The baby is a man (male).’ (lit. ‘The baby mans.’)

Wijimain na xirim.
smallness-3N 3S:RPP house
‘The house is small.’ (lit. ‘The house smalls.’)

Hwap na pije'.
fast:S 3S:RPP child
‘The child is fast.’ (lit. ‘The child fasts.’)

=== Definiteness ===
Wariʼ does not have any articles. Definiteness or indefiniteness can be expressed by either the use of demonstratives or verbal inflectional clitics containing the object. However this latter option does not always distinguish definiteness, as indefinite objects can also be marked in the inflectional clitics.

Cao' 'ina hwam.
eat 1S:RPP fish
'I ate fish.' (Indefinite)

Cao' 'inon hwam.
eat 1S:RPP-3S.M fish
'I ate (the) fish.' (Ambiguous)

Cao' 'inon hwam cwa'.
eat 1S:RPP-3S.M fish this:MF
'I ate this fish.' (Definite)

== Bibliography ==
- Angenot, Geralda de Lima Vitor (2013-08-23). "FONOTÁTICA E FONOLOGIA DO LEXEMA PROTOCHAPAKURA". Revista Eletrônica Língua Viva (in Brazilian Portuguese). 3 (1) 1: 31–37. ISSN 2237-9800.
- Everett, Daniel; Kern, Barbara (1997). Wariʼ: The Pacaas Novos language of western Brazil. London: Routledge.
- Ladefoged, Peter; Everett, Daniel (1996). "The status of phonetic rarities". Language. 72 (4): 794–800. doi:10.2307/416103. JSTOR 416103.
- MacEachern, Margaret R.; Kern, Barbara; Ladefoged, Peter (1996). "Wariʼ phonetic structures". Fieldwork Studies of Targeted Languages IV. UCLA Working Papers in Phonetics. 93.
