= Wanyam language =

Extinct Chapacuran language of Brazil

Wanyam
- Wanham
- Native to: Brazil
- Region: Rondônia
- Ethnicity: Wanám
- Extinct: after 1997, with the death of Firmino Miguelem
- Language family: Chapacuran: Wari; Wanyam
- Dialects: Abitana; Cujuna; Cabixi; Mataua; Cumaná; Urunamacan; Miguelenho

Language codes
- ISO 639-3: xbx Kabixi (retired) (Note: The ISO 639 code categorized Cabishi as a "Chapacura-Wanham" language; i.e. a Chapacuran language.)
- Glottolog: wany1246

Wanyam or Wanham (Wañam, Huanyam) is a Chapacuran language of Rondônia, between the rivers São Miguel and Cautário. Abitana was a dialect. It was spoken by a few families in the 1970s, but is now extinct. As of 1997, one speaker, Firmino Miguelem, was known of the Miguelenho (Uomo) variety.

== Dialects ==
Dialects of Wanyam:

- Cabishi (ambiguous name, not to be confused with unclassified Cabixi-Natterer)
- Cujuna
- Cumaná (Cutianá)
- Matama (Matawa)
- Urunamacan
- Pawumwa (Abitana-Wanyam)

Lévi-Strauss had also proposed a Huanyam linguistic stock consisting of Mataua, Cujuna (Cuijana), Urunamakan, Cabishí, Cumaná, Abitana-Huanyam (from Snethlage's data), and Pawumwa (from Haseman's data).
