= San Martín River (Bolivia) =

San Martin River
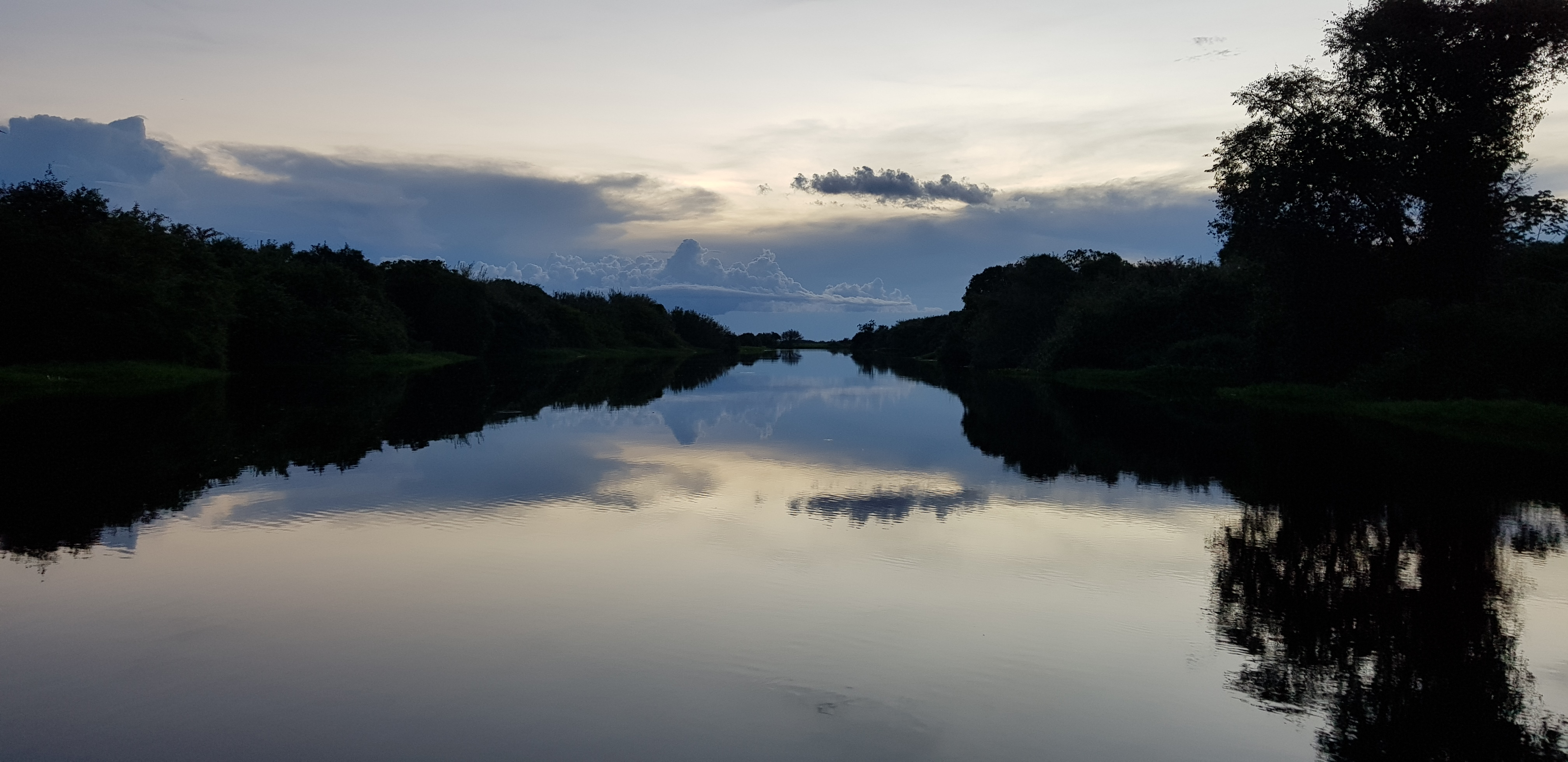
- San Martin River

Location
- Country: Bolivia

Physical characteristics
- Mouth: Baures River
- Length: 550 km (340 mi)

The San Martin River is a river of Bolivia.

== See also ==
- List of rivers of Bolivia
