= Rápulo River =

River in Bolivia

Coordinates: 13°43′S 65°32′W

Rápulo River also Ráputo River (Spanish: Río Rápulo, Río Ráputo) is a river in Beni Department, Bolivia. It is a tributary of the Yacuma River in the Amazon Basin. It joins the Yacuma just below the town of Santa Ana del Yacuma.
