= Quitemoca language =

Extinct Chapacuran language of South America

Quitemoca
- Quitemo
- Region: Bolivia–Brazil border area
- Ethnicity: Quitemoca people
- Native speakers: unknown rememberers (2013)
- Language family: Chapacuran: Kitemoka–Chapakura; Quitemoca

Language codes
- ISO 639-3: None (mis)
- Glottolog: kite1237

Quitemoca (Quitemo, Kitemoka) is an extinct Chapacuran language. It is closely related to Napeca, and may be a dialect.

== Phonology ==
The following tables illustrate the phoneme inventory of Quitemoca:

=== Vowels ===
	Front	Central	Back
Close	i		u
Mid	e		o
Open		a	

=== Consonants ===
		Labial		Dental/ Alveolar	Palatal (-alveolar)	Velar	Glottal
		plain	labial	Dental/ Alveolar	Palatal (-alveolar)	Velar	Glottal
Nasal		m	mʷ	n	ɲ		
Occlusive		p	pʷ	t	tʃ	k	ʔ
Fricative				s	ʃ		h
Liquid	median			ɾ	j	w	
Liquid	lateral				ʎ		

== Bibliography ==
- Angenot, Geralda de Lima Vitor (2013-08-23). "FONOTÁTICA E FONOLOGIA DO LEXEMA PROTOCHAPAKURA". Revista Eletrônica Língua Viva (in Brazilian Portuguese). 3 (1) 1: 31–37. ISSN 2237-9800.
- Créqui-Montfort, Georges de; Rivet, Paul (1913). "Linguistique bolivienne. La famille linguistique Čapakura". Journal de la société des américanistes. 10 (1): 119–171. doi:10.3406/jsa.1913.2851.
- Danielsen, Swintha (January 2013). "Evaluating historical data (wordlists) in the case of bolivian extinct languages". STUF - Language Typology and Universals. 66 (3). doi:10.1524/stuf.2013.0014. ISSN 2196-7148.
- Grondona, Verónica; Campbell, Lyle, eds. (2012-01-27). "The Indigenous Languages of South America: A Comprehensive Guide". The Indigenous Languages of South America. De Gruyter Mouton. p. 84. doi:10.1515/9783110258035. hdl:1887/70116. ISBN 978-3-11-025803-5.
