= Emil Heinrich Snethlage =

German zoologist and anthropologist (1897–1939)

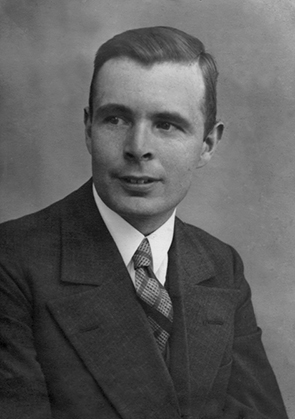

Emil Heinrich Snethlage (31 August 1897 – 25 November 1939) was a German naturalist and ethnographer who made two expeditions into South America and worked at the Ethnological Museum of Berlin. He was a nephew of the ornithologist Emilie Snethlage.

== Life and work ==
Snethlage was born in Bremerhaven, the son of high school teacher Viktor and Anna (Hedde) Snethlage. His father moved several times as a teacher at schools in Pomerania and Westphalia. During World War I he went for military service in the navy at Wilhelmshaven He then finished high school and went to the university in Freiburg, Kiel and Berlin, to study natural sciences. His aunt, Emilie Snethlage, was an inspiration. He received a doctorate in botany studying a tree and its ant symbiosis in 1923 from Berlin and then went to Belem, Brazil to work with his aunt on birds. He worked on a collection of birds for Hellmayr at the Field Museum of Natural History. He collected 2000 skins which included the rediscovery of a rare Megaxenops parnaguae. He returned to Germany in 1926 and gave a lecture to the Berlin Anthropological Society which led to his being hired in 1927 as an assistant at the Völkerkunde Museum in Berlin, working on South American ethographic objects. In 1933 he went to South America on an ethnographic expedition sponsored by the Baessler Foundation in Berlin. The expedition lasted a year and a half and travelled through difficult terrain and he suffered from ill health. They interviewed 13 tribes in the Guaporé river region and collected objects. He did not publish much but his field diaries and photographs were deposited in the museum. He also recorded songs on wax cylinders. On October 5, 1939, he was appointed as acting director for the South American collections at the Museum. Just before World War II he went on a German navy training and suffered an injury in his leg. This led to thrombosis and he died from a pulmonary embolism in Potsdam. He asked his wife Annelise (born Streichhan) to try and publish his manuscripts. Annelise moved to Austria and many of her manuscripts were not transported. She was helped by Austrian ethnologist Martin Gusinde and French ethologist Paul Rivet to avoid being expelled from Austria. She and her son Rotger moved back in 1947. She died in 1981. Their son Rotger digitized many of Emil's field notes.
