= Rocorona language =

Extinct Chapacuran language of Bolivia

Rocorona
- Ocoróna
- Native to: Bolivia
- Region: Beni Department
- Ethnicity: Rocorona
- Extinct: (date missing)
- Language family: Chapacuran: (unclassified); Rocorona

Language codes
- ISO 639-3: None (mis)
- Glottolog: roco1235

Rocorona, or Ocoróna, is an extinct language of Bolivia of the Chapacuran family. It is known only from three short texts, namely the Lord's Prayer, Ave Maria, and Nicene Creed.

Birchall (2013) presents an in-depth analysis of the surviving Rocorona texts from Jesuit missions in Bolivia. The texts were analyzed by Georges de Crequi-Montfort and Paul Rivet (1913).

== Phonology ==
=== Consonants ===
Rocorona consonants
	Labial	Alveolar	Palatal (-alveolar)	Velar	Glottal
Nasal	m	n	(ɲ) ⟨ñ⟩		
Plosive	p	t		k	(ʔ)
Fricative		s	ʃ or ʒ ⟨ʒ⟩		
Liquid		ɾ	j	w	

- /ɲ/ may not be a distinct phoneme.
- ⟨ʒ⟩ is more likely to be IPA [ʃ] based on comparison with other Chapacuran languages, but the exact articulation is unknown.

=== Vowels ===
Rocorona has a 5-vowel system.

	Front	Central	Back
Close	i		u
Close-mid	e		o
Open		a	

Noticeably unusual is the absence of the vowel /y/.

== Vocabulary ==
Rokorona vocabuary
Rokorona	Gloss
jamarima	woman
tipra-	hand/arm
wati	person/us
treji-	ear
timak	earth
wajama	child
iten	father
ini	mother
towa	day/white
witi-	name

== Sample text ==
A morpheme-by-morpheme gloss of the Lord's Prayer is given below, from Birchall (2013).

Corotenesi Dios paumama pavim,
Koro=tene-si Dios {paw mama} p-awin
?=father=1PL.INCL God {? ?} OBL-high
'Our father who art in heaven'

oropatanapaiñtra vitim:
{oropata=na pa-in=tra} witi-m
{hear=3SG.NFUT OBL-3N=3SG.FUT} name-2SG
'Holy be thy name'

payguantra reinonam
pajiwan=tra reino-nam
(arrive?)=3SG.FUT kingdom-2SG
'your kingdom will come,'

caracopiyma aratra patimac
{ka ra ko pijim ma} ara=tra pa-timak
{NMLZ ? INFL:M/F say 2SG} make=3SG.FUT OBL-earth
'your will be done on Earth'

pani pavintra
{pan ne} p-awin=tra
{be 3N} OBL-high=3SG.FUT
'as it will be in Heaven.'

Missirit pacañica paiñ caracaguanasit
mi=sirit pakanika pa-in {ka ara kaw wa nasit}
give=3SG:1PL.EXCL.NFUT ? OBL-3N {NOM make eat INF 1PL.EXCL}
'Give us your daily bread'

masiransirit paiñ maram pecatonasit
masiran=sirit pa-in maram pecato-nasit
forgive=3SG:1PL.EXCL.NFUT OBL-3N COLL sin-1PL.EXCL
'forgive us of our sins,'

paacarit pococon maraguati coromasiram arit
paakarit p-okokon mara wati koro-masiram=arit
? OBL-3PL.MASC COLL people ?-forgive=1PL.EXCL.NFUT
'as we forgive those who sin against us,'

coro veneminaparit parotsirit
koro wenemi=na-parit parot=sirit
enter ?=3SG.NFUT-1PL.EXCL ?=3SG:1PL.EXCL.NFUT
'and not lead us into temptation'

iyo taarameget ecoparit naùcam
ijo {ta arameket} e=ko-parit {naw kami(?)}
? {? ?} ?=3SG.MASC-1.PL.EXCL {? ?}
'and deliver us from evil(?)'

parotsirit paiñ masinaiñ apitra. Amen.
parot=sirit pa-in masi=na-in api=tra amen
?=3SG:1PL.EXCL.NFUT OBL-3N ?=3SG.NFUT-3N finish=3SG.FUT amen
'(For thine is the kingdom….?) Amen'

== Sources ==
- Birchall, A look at the Rokorona language
