= Baures River =

Location
- Country: Bolivia

Physical characteristics
- Mouth: Guaporé River
- Length: 470 km (290 mi)

The Baures River is a river in Bolivia.
