= Oro Win language =

Moribund Chapacuran language of Brazil

Oro Win
- Oro Towati'
- Native to: Brazil
- Region: Rondônia
- Ethnicity: 55 Oro Win (1998)
- Native speakers: 5 (2011)
- Language family: Chapacuran: Wari; Oro Win

Language codes
- ISO 639-3: orw
- Glottolog: orow1243
- ELP: Orowari
- Oro Win is classified as Critically Endangered by the UNESCO Atlas of the World's Languages in Danger.

Oro Win is a moribund Chapacuran language spoken along the upper stretches of the Pacaás Novos River in Brazil. As of 2010, there were only six known speakers of Oro Win in Brazil, and all of them were over 50 years of age. However, other reports dictate that there are 12 speakers as of 2015, and there are efforts to increase use of Oro Win among the community.

== Phonology ==
=== Vowels ===
Phonemes
	Front		Central	Back
	unr.	rnd.	Central	Back
Close	i	y		
Close-mid	e			o
Open			a	

Phones
	Front		Central	Back
	unr.	rnd.	Central	Back
Close	i	y		
Near-close	ɪ			ʊ
Close-mid	e			o
Open-mid	ɛ			
Open			a	

=== Consonants ===
	Bilabial	Dental	Alveolar	Palatal	Velar	Glottal
Nasal	m	n̪				
Plosive	p	t̪			k	ʔ
Affricate	(t̪ʙ̥)					
Continuant	(ɸ)	ɾ̪	s	j	w	

- Popky (1999) considers /ɸ, t̪ʙ̥/ to be phonemes, while Angenot (2013, pp. 38, 39) lists them as allophones of /p, t̪/, respectively.

== Vocabulary ==
[tʙ̥otʙ̥ok inan] 'I walk on logs'

[kotʙ̥ok inan] 'I start a motor'

[katʙ̥ʉ na] 'It is an owl'

[tʙ̥untʙʉ na] 'It is a helicopter'

[tʙ̥um] 'small boy'

== Bibliography ==
- Angenot, Geralda de Lima Vitor (2013-08-23). "FONOTÁTICA E FONOLOGIA DO LEXEMA PROTOCHAPAKURA". Revista Eletrônica Língua Viva (in Brazilian Portuguese). 3 (1) 1: 31–37. ISSN 2237-9800.
- Everett, Daniel; Kern, Barbara (1997). Wariʼ: The Pacaas Novos language of western Brazil. London: Routledge.
- Ladefoged, Peter; Everett, Daniel (1996). "The status of phonetic rarities". Language. 72 (4): 794–800. doi:10.2307/416103. JSTOR 416103.
- Popky, Donna H. (1999). Oro Win: a descriptive and comparative look at an endangered language (MA thesis). Pittsburgh: University of Pittsburgh.
