= Cautário River =

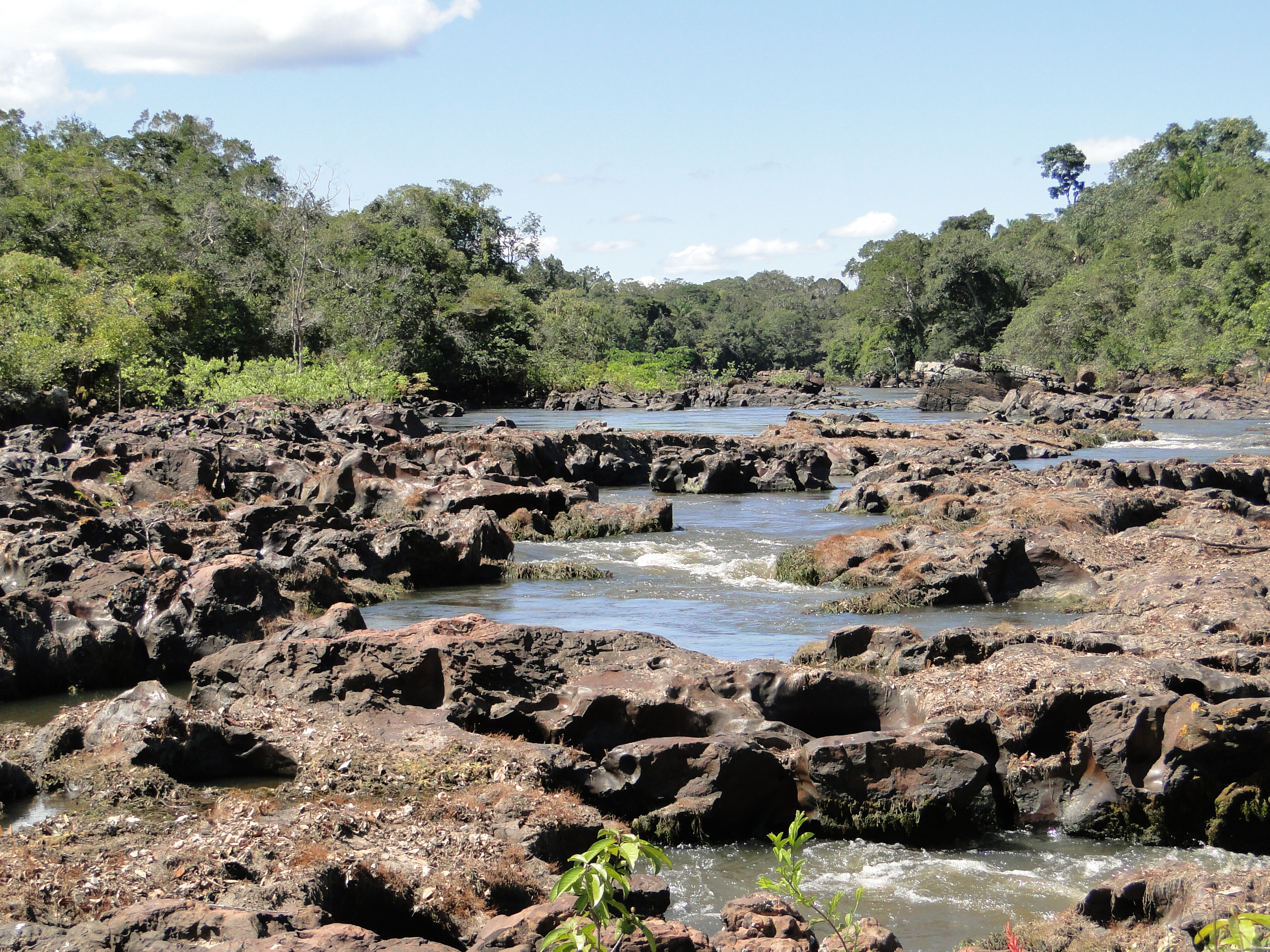
- Cautário River in the dry season

- Location within Brazil
- Native name: Rio Cautário (Portuguese)

Location
- Country: Brazil

Physical characteristics
- Source
  - location: Rondônia state
- Mouth
  - location: Guaporé River
  - coordinates: 12.211400°S 64.595044°W

Basin features
- River system: Guaporé River

The Cautário River (Portuguese: Rio Cautário) is a river of Rondônia state in western Brazil. It is a right tributary of the Guaporé River.

== Course ==
The Cautário River rises in the Uru-Eu-Wau-Wau Indigenous Territory. It is fed by streams from the 650 metres (2,130 ft) Serra Uopianes and the 750 metres (2,460 ft) Serra Pacaás Novos. The river runs in a southwest direction, forming the boundary between the Rio Cautário Federal Extractive Reserve and the Rio Cautário State Extractive Reserve. It flows into the Guaporé/Mamoré river, which in turn feeds the Madeira River at the city of Nova Mamoré.

The Cautário River has clear waters fed by a region without major deforestation and silting of the river's margins. It has rapids, but always with a drop of less than 2 metres (6 ft 7 in). These include Bom Destino, Desengano, Esperança and Cujubim. The most rugged stretch is between Redenção e Bom Destino. It is navigable, even in the middle section around Bom Destino, but only in the rainy season. During the dry season the river bed has extensive sandbanks.

== See also ==
- List of rivers of Rondônia

== Sources ==
- RESEX do Rio Cautário (in Portuguese), ISA: Instituto Socioambiental
- Unidade de Conservação: Reserva Extrativista do Rio Cautário (in Portuguese), MMA: Ministério do Meio Ambiente
