= Chapacura language =

Extinct Chapacuran language

Chapacura
- Tapacura
- Huachi
- Native to: Bolivia, Brazil
- Region: Bolivia–Brazil border area
- Extinct: by 1884
- Language family: Chapacuran: Kitemoka–Chapakura; Chapacura

Language codes
- ISO 639-3: None (mis)
- Glottolog: chap1269

Chapacura, Tapacura, or Huachi is an extinct Chapacuran language. The language was extinct by 1884.
