= Chácobo people =

Chácobo Nóʔciria

Total population
- 1,532

Regions with significant populations
- Bolivia

Languages
- Chácobo • Spanish

Religion
- Traditional Tribal Religion

Related ethnic groups
- Pakahuara people

The Chácobo are an indigenous people of Bolivia who number 1,532 in 2012. They primarily live near the Ivon y Medio River and Benicito River in Beni of northeastern Bolivia. One band also lives near the Yata River.

== Name ==
"Chácobo" comes from a neighboring language. Their autonym is Nóʔciria, meaning "We who are truly ourselves." They are also known as the Pacaguara, Pacaguara de Ivon, or Pachuara people.

== Language ==
The Chácobo language is a Chákobo language belonging to the Bolivian Panoan languages, which are part of the greater Panoan language family. The language is taught in bilingual schools and written in the Latin script.

== History ==
In the past, Chácobo people lived on the northern shore of Lake Rogo Aguado and upper reaches of Rio Yata.

== Culture ==
Chácobo traditionally were nomadic and fished, hunted, and gathered wild plants, with farming only playing a minor part in their lives.
