= Puerto Rico, Pando =

Puerto Rico (Pando)
- Town
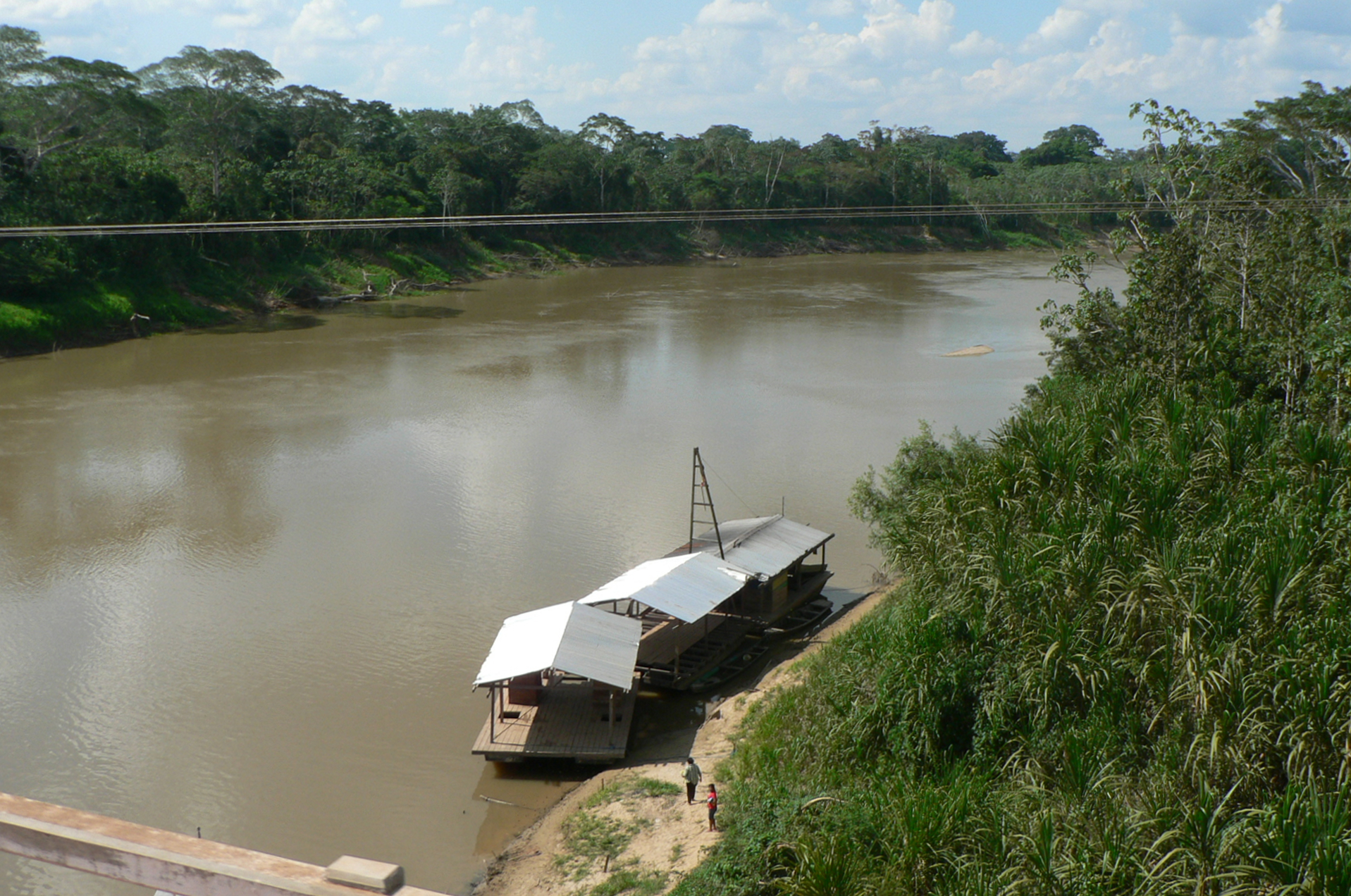
- Orthon River, Puerto Rico, Bolivia

- Flag Seal
- Nickname(s): "La Isla del Encanto" (Spanish) ('The Island of Enchantment')
- Motto(s): "Joannes est nomen ejus" (Latin) ('John is his name')
- Anthem: "La Borinqueña" (Spanish) ("The Song of Borinquen")
- Location in Bolivia Puerto Rico (Pando) (South America)
- Coordinates: 11°06′12″S 67°33′17″W
- Country: Bolivia
- Department: Pando Department
- Province: Manuripi Province
- Elevation: 574 ft (175 m)

Population (2013)
  - Total: 2,872
- Time zone: UTC-4 (BOT)

Puerto Rico is a small town in Pando, northern Bolivia, with an associated airport. It is located in the Manuripi-Heath Amazonian Wildlife National Reserve. Founded on May 18, 1890, it was the first departamental capital, before Cobija. It is located at the Confluence of the Manuripi and Tahuamanu Rivers. Every year, in the month of June, the International Recreational Fishing Championship of Puerto Rico takes place at the river confluence, where the two rivers combine to form the river the River Orthon. This river then flows 410 km before it converges with the River Beni.

== Climate ==
Puerto Rico is located in the Bolivian lowlands in the Amazon River system. The surrounding region is mostly tropical rainforest.

The average annual temperature of the region is 26.5 °C, and monthly average temperatures show little seasonal variation. The annual precipitation is 1,800 mm. Maximum monthly precipitation is over 200 mm during the rainy season from December to March, and during dry season from June to August monthly precipitation can be as low as 30 mm.

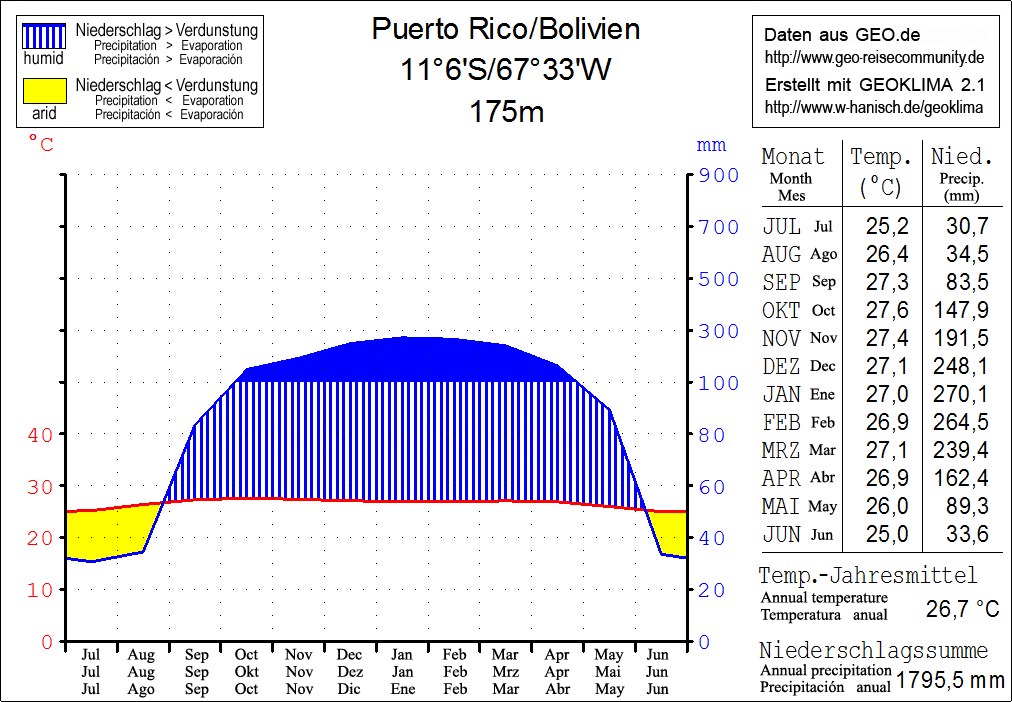
Climate Diagram for Puerto Rico, showing both precipitation and temperature. Temperature is the red line. The yellow and blue areas represent the dry and rainy season respectively.

== Transport ==
Puerto Rico is 169 kilometers east of Cobija, the capital of the department, and is an important river crossing for the Ruta 13 road. From Cobija, the 370 km long highway Ruta 13 leads east via Porvenir to Puerto Rico, where it crosses the Río Orthon, and then on to El Triangulo (El Choro). In El Choro, Ruta 13 meets Ruta 8, which leads from Guayaramerín and Riberalta in the north to Reyes, Rurrenabaque and Yucumo in the central Bolivian lowlands.

== Population ==
The Bolivian Census has shown that the population of the town has been steadily increasing over recent decades. In 1992, The population of the town was 509. This increased to 1,522 by 2001 and was recorded as 2,872 at the 2013 census.
