= Puruma River =

Puruma
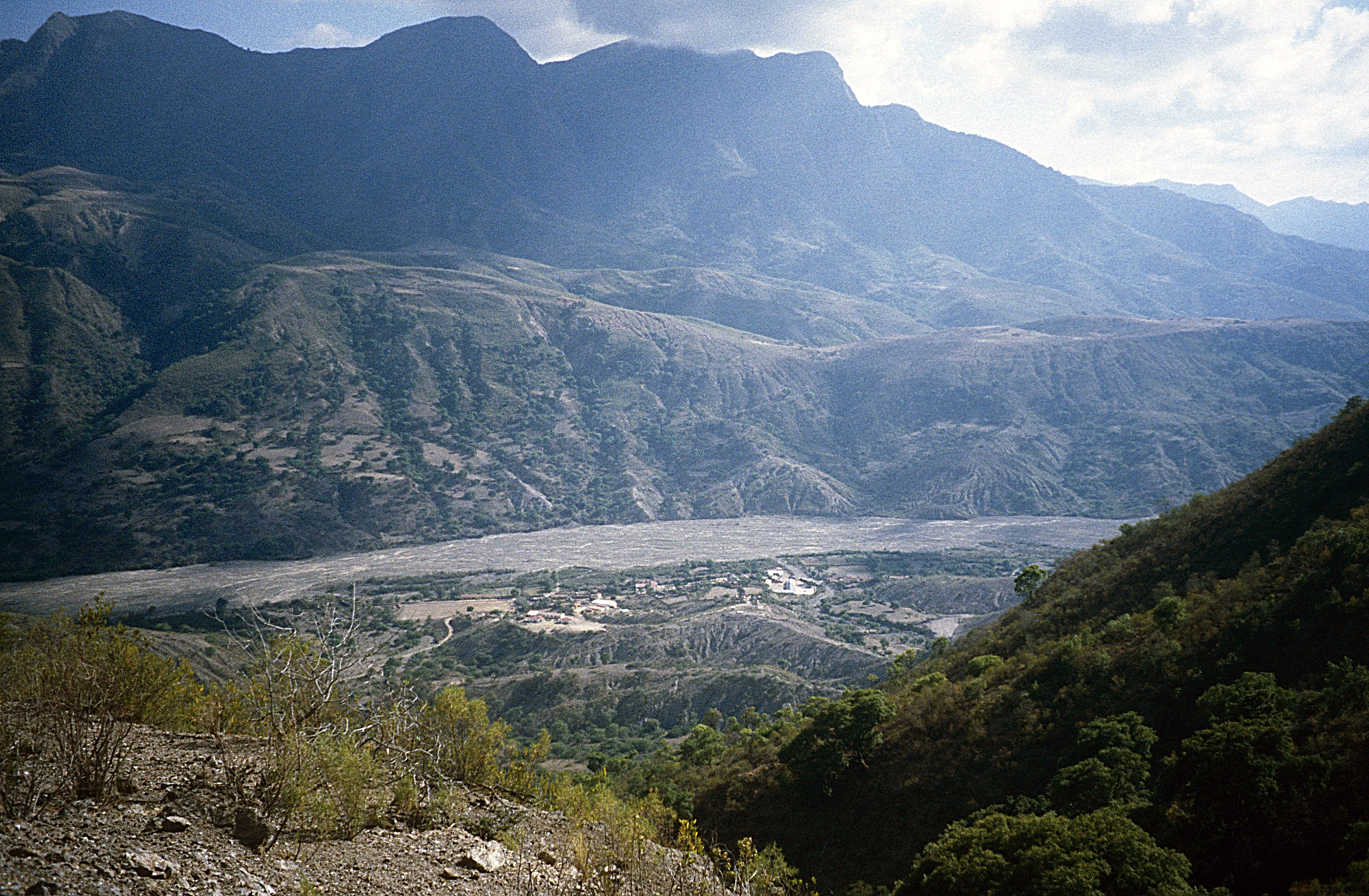
- Puruma River and Puruma as seen from the south
- Etymology: Quechua

Location
- Country: Bolivia
- Region: Chuquisaca Department
- Municipality: Oropeza Province

Physical characteristics
- Mouth: Río Exaltación

Puruma River (Quechua puruma land fertilized by sowing legumes) is a Bolivian river in the Chuquisaca Department, Oropeza Province, Puruma Municipality. It is an affluent of Río Exaltación whose waters flow to San Pedro River, a right tributary of Río Grande.

The river runs along the little town Puruma.

== See also ==
- List of rivers of Bolivia
- Maran Mayu
