= Challana River =

Location
- Country: Bolivia

Physical characteristics
- Mouth: Kaka River
  - location: Guanay
  - coordinates: 15°30′04″S 67°52′09″W

The Challana River is a river of Bolivia.

== See also ==
- List of rivers of Bolivia
