= Choqueyapu River =

Coordinates: 16.5556°S 68.0942°W

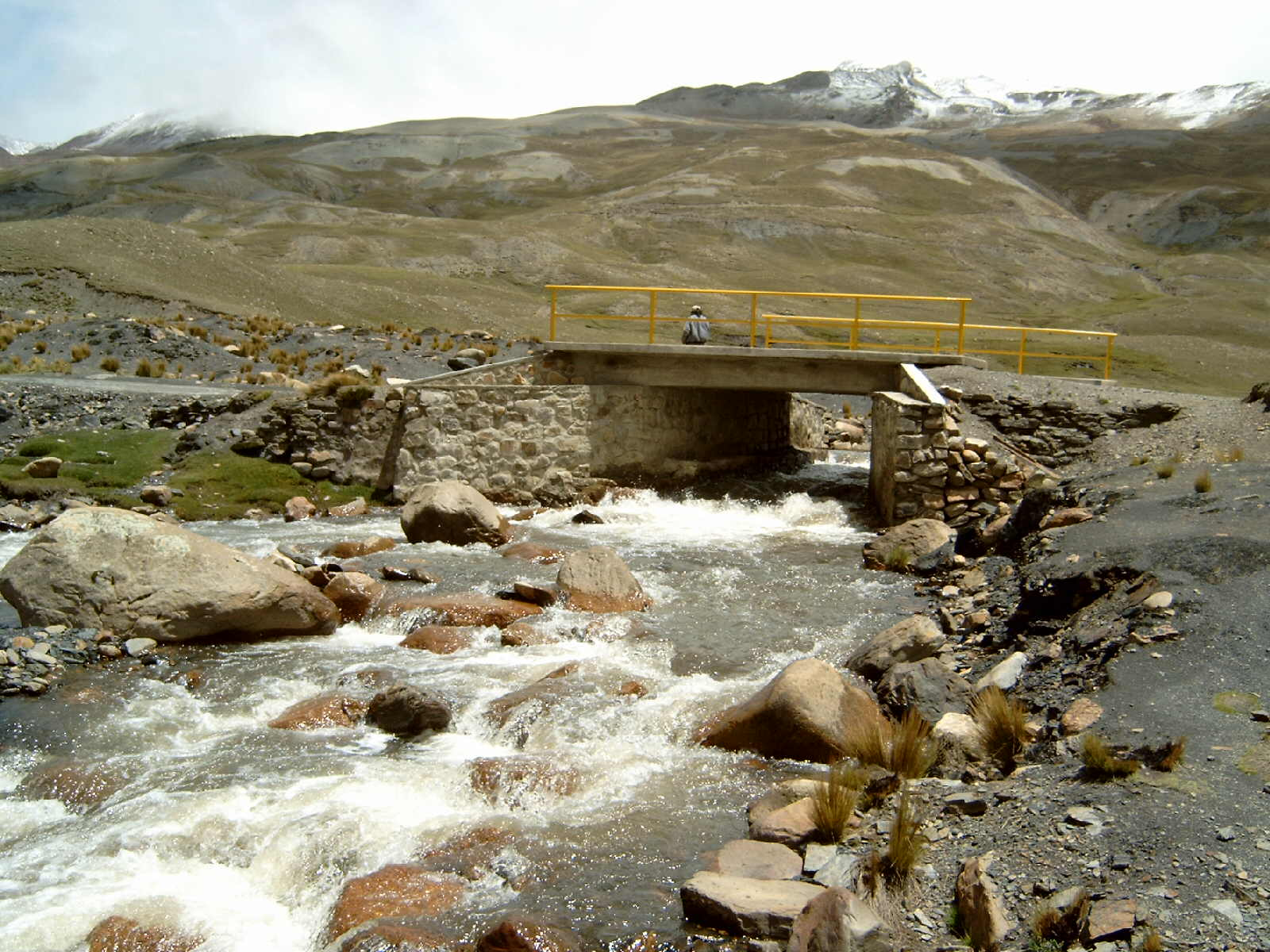
- Etymology: Aymara

Location
- Country: Bolivia
- Region: La Paz Department

Physical characteristics
- Source: Cordillera Real

Basin features
- Tributaries
  - left: Urqu Jawira, Irpawi

The Choqueyapu River, sometimes called the La Paz River, is a river in the La Paz Department of Bolivia. It belongs to the drainage basin of the Amazon. The river originates in a spring called Achachi Qala (Aymara: achachi border stone, old, grandfather, qala stone) in the Cordillera Real near the mountain Chacaltaya at a height of 5,395 m. It crosses the city La Paz from north to south. South of Illimani and north of the Kimsa Cruz mountain range it turns to the east; at this point it is better known as the La Paz River. The confluence with Cotacajes River is the beginning of the Beni River, also known as Alto Beni ("high Beni") in this region. The river is known to be contaminated with sewage, with enteropathogenic bacteria which is believed to contribute to the high incidence of diarrheal disease in the city of La Paz.

Tributaries include the Amutara River.

== See also ==
- List of rivers of Bolivia
