= Chayanta =

Chayanta may refer to:

- Chayanta Province, a province in the Potosí Department in Bolivia
- Chayanta Municipality, a municipio in the Rafael Bustillo Province in Bolivia
- Chayanta, Bolivia, a small town in the Chayanta Municipality in Bolivia
- Chayanta River, in the Potosí Department of Bolivia.
