= Pacahuara =

Total population
- 227

Regions with significant populations
- Bolivia

Languages
- Pacahuara language, Spanish

Religion
- traditional tribal religion

Related ethnic groups
- Chácobo

The Pacahuara are an indigenous people of Bolivia. A small group live in Tujuré, a community located near the Chácobo people on the Alto Ivón River in the Beni Department. The group only consists of four contacted people. The fifth, a 57-year-old woman, died on 31 December 2016 in the village of Tujure in the north-east of the country. Another uncontacted group of Pacahuara, with 50 members in eight families, lives between Rio Negro and Río Pacajuaras in the Pando of northeastern Bolivia, near the Brazilian border.

In the past, the tribe had two subgroups: the Sinabu and Capuibo.

== Population and "the last Pacahuaras" ==
The Pacahuara community on the Alto Ivón River began with the efforts of Summer Institute of Linguistics missionaries Guy East and Gilbert Prost to contact the group from 1969 to 1971. The missionaries moved a Pacahuara family, consisting of a man married to two sisters, and their seven children to Puerto Tujuré in Chácobo territory. Since 1974, multiple reports have referred to this family as "the last Pacahuaras." Two children of the family, Bose and Buca married one another but had no children. Several of their siblings married Chácobo spouses and have children as does one sister who married two non-indigenous men and had a child with each. Altogether, 43 individuals are either descendants of the family that was moved to Puerto Tujuré, including seven who had died as of mid-2016.

Many additional people identified as Pacahuara in Bolivia's 2012 Census, in which a total of 161 individuals indicated this ethnicity. Diego Villar attributes this "Pacaguara boom" to the increased local value of Pacahuara identity in a plurinational Bolivia, among other local factors. He notes several instances of Chacobo relatives of the Pacahuaras, or communities in which they live, now describing themselves as Pacahuaras.

In addition, five families of Pacahuaras living in voluntary isolation are believed to be in Pando Department.

== Language ==
The language of the contacted Pacahuara is a Bolivian Panoan language, which are part of the greater Panoan language family. The language is not written.

It is not clear if an Arawakan language called Pacaguara was spoken by the Pacahuara people, or if the identical name is a coincidence.

There is also a word list collected by Castillo that has not been classified. See Pacahuaras-Castillo.

== Economy ==
The Pacahuaran economy is agriculture and harvesting-based, with collected chestnut and palm hearts used in trade. Those chestnuts and palm heart not traded are consumed by the collectors or converted into other goods: chestnuts may be processed into homemade soap, while palm hearts are good sources of protein.

== Agriculture ==
Agriculture is simple, rustic and limited to rice, corn, sugarcane, cassava, and banana bachi. Hunting and fishing are traditional activities and even to this day vital for their livelihoods, along with the harvesting of fruits.
