= Porvenir, Pando =

Porvenir
- town in the Pando Department, Bolivia.
- Location in Bolivia
- Coordinates: 11°14′17″S 68°41′13″W
- Country: Bolivia
- Department: Pando Department
- Province: Nicolás Suárez
- Elevation: 222 m (728 ft)

Population (2012)
  - Total: 4,267
- Time zone: UTC-4 (BOT)
- Area code: +591

Porvenir is a small town in the Nicolás Suárez Province of the Pando Department in Bolivia. It is located 33 kilometers south of Cobija, the department's capital city, at an altitude of 222 m on the left banks of Tahuamanu River, which in its later course is named Orthon River before it discharges into Beni River.

== Population ==
The population of Porvenir has risen strongly during the past two decades to almost five-fold:

| Year | Population | Census |
|---|---|---|
| 1992 | 910 | census |
| 2001 | 1 730 | census |
| 2012 | 4 267 | census |
