= Puerto Teresa Río Yata =

- Village
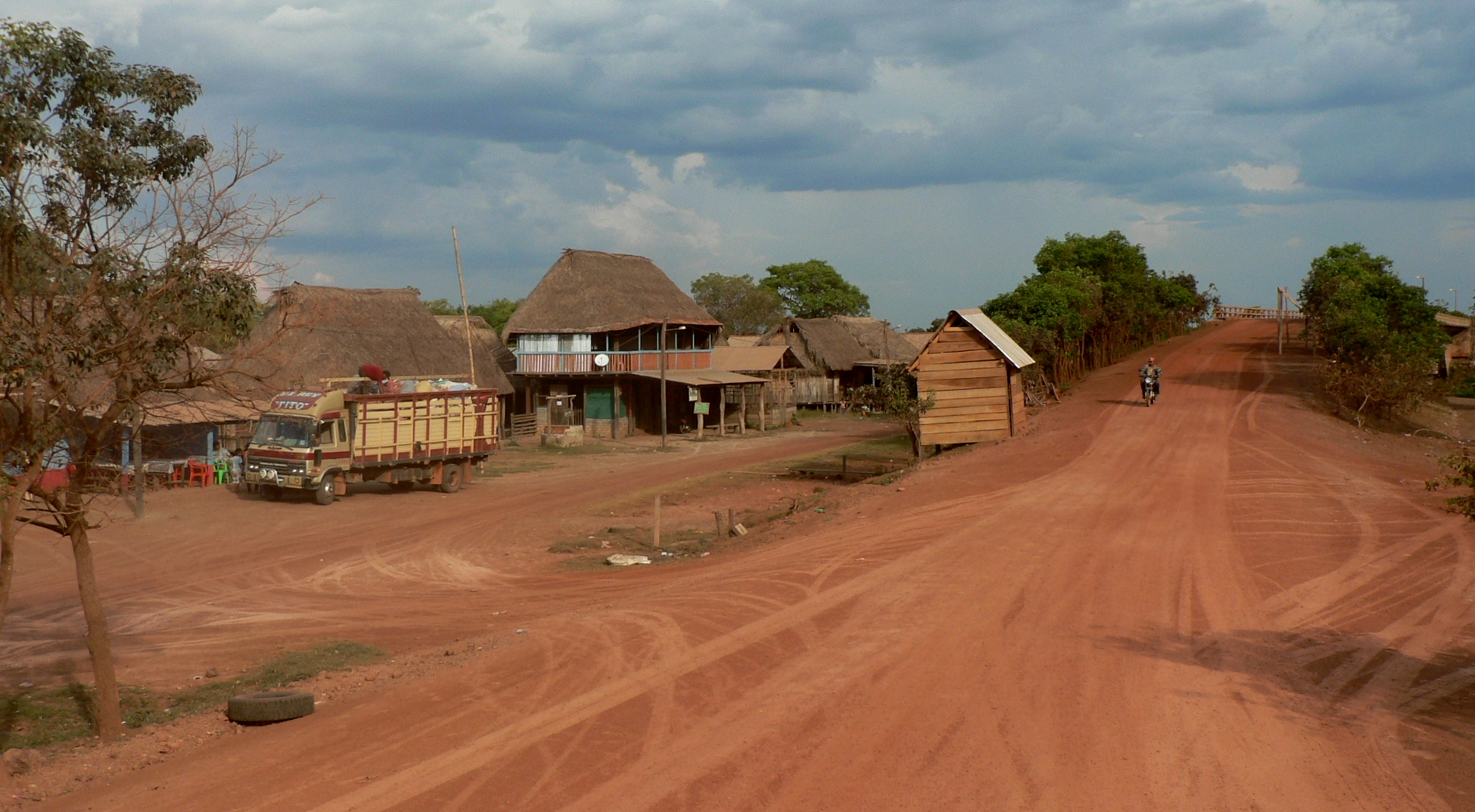
- Puerto Teresa Río Yata

- Location of Puerto Yata in Bolivia
- Coordinates: 13°26′52″S 66°36′04″W
- Country: Bolivia
- Department: Beni Department
- Province: Ballivián Province
- Settled: 1991
- Elevation: 162 m (531 ft)

Population (2001)
  - Total: 205
- Time zone: UTC-4 (BOT)

Puerto Teresa Río Yata is a newly built community located in the northeast region of the Beni Department on the Bolivian Pacific – Atlantic highway and at the Yata River, a tributary of the Beni River. It is part of the community of Santa Rosa de Yacuma in the José Ballivián Province of the Beni Department. It was founded on September 17, 1991.
