= Tallija River =

Coordinates: 17.5053°S 66.8161°W

Location
- Country: Bolivia

Physical characteristics
- Source
  - location: Amazon River
  - elevation: 3,374 m (11,070 ft)
- Mouth
  - location: Leque River
  - elevation: 4,262 m (13,983 ft)
- Length: 24 km (15 mi)

The Tallija River is a river of Bolivia.

== See also ==
- List of rivers of Bolivia
