= Sabaya (disambiguation) =

Sabaya is a town in Bolivia.

Sabaya may also refer to:

- Sabaya (film), a 2021 Swedish documentary film directed by Hogir Hirori
- Abu Sabaya (1962–2002), a leader of the jihadist group Abu Sayyaf
- Sabaya Province, a province in Bolivia
- Sabaya River, a river in Bolivia

== See also ==
- Sabayah, a Yemeni pastry also known as Bint al-sahn
