= Urqu Jawira =

Urqu Jawira may refer to:

- Urqu Jawira (Aroma), a Bolivian river
- Urqu Jawira (Pedro Domingo Murillo), a Bolivian river
