= Chipamanu River =

Chipamanu River Xipamanu River

Location
- Country: Bolivia, Brazil

Physical characteristics
- Mouth
  - location: Abunã River
  - coordinates: 10°43′S 67°42′W

The Chipamanu (Spanish: Río Chipamanu) or Xipamanu River (Portuguese: Rio Xipamanu) is a river of Bolivia and Brazil. The river flows through the community of Piçarreira, and forms part of the border between Bolivia and the Brazilian state of Acre.

== See also ==
- List of rivers of Bolivia
