= Pelechuco River =

River in Bolivia

Location
- Country: Bolivia

The Pelechuco River is a river of Bolivia.

== See also ==
- List of rivers of Bolivia
