= Matos River =

Location
- Country: Bolivia

Ramsar Wetland
- Official name: Río Matos
- Designated: 2 February 2013
- Reference no.: 2093

The Matos River is a river of Bolivia.

== See also ==
- List of rivers of Bolivia
