= Maran Mayu =

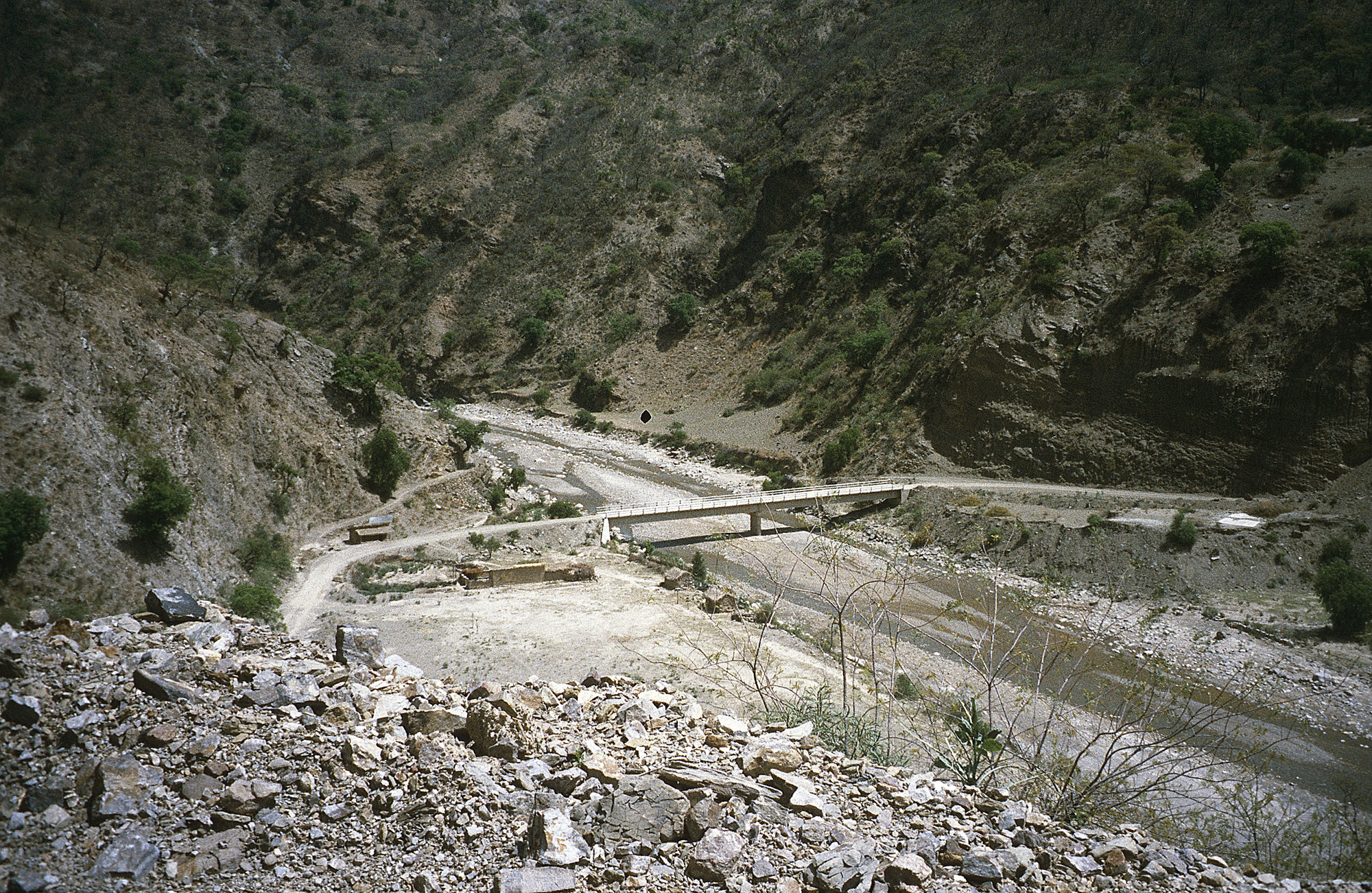
- A bridge across Maran Mayu
- Etymology: Quechua

Location
- Country: Bolivia
- Region: Chuquisaca Department

Maran Mayu (Quechua maran batan, mayu river, "batan river") is a Bolivian river in the Chuquisaca Department.

== See also ==
- List of rivers of Bolivia
