= Tomina River =

Tomina

Location
- Country: Bolivia
- Region: Chuquisaca Department

Physical characteristics
- Mouth: Río Grande

The Tomina River is a river of Bolivia in the Chuquisaca Department. It is a right affluent of the Río Grande.

== See also ==
- List of rivers of Bolivia
