= Ichoa River =

Ichoa

Location
- Country: Bolivia
- Region: Cochabamba Department

The Ichoa River is a river of Bolivia.

== See also ==
- List of rivers of Bolivia
