= Sacambaya River =

River in the La Paz Department, Bolivia

Location
- Country: Bolivia
- State: Cochabamba Department, La Paz Department

Physical characteristics
- Mouth
  - coordinates: 16°49′49″S 66°48′55″W

The Sacambaya River is a river of Bolivia in the La Paz Department. According to legend it housed a hoard of treasure.

== History ==
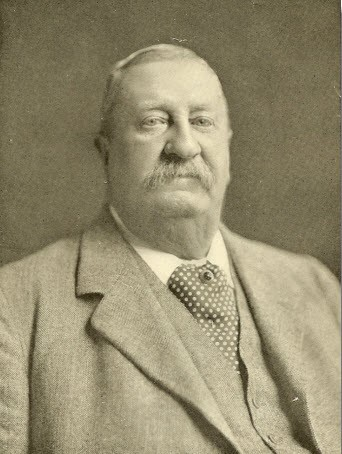
Cecil Hebert Prodgers

According to legend, the Sacambaya river housed a hoard of treasure hidden by Jesuit missionaries in 1745 before the expulsion from the area. Cecil Prodgers, a Boer war veteran, claimed to have learned about these legends from a document given to him by the family of an elderly Jesuit priest. According to the document, the gold could be found on a steep hill covered with a dense forest. It was supposedly marked with an egg-shaped stone. Underneath this hill, it was said that there was a cavern which hid the treasure. The document stated that it took five hundred men two-and-a-half years to dig this cave, and the gold itself was guarded with a strong enough poison to kill a regiment of men. He attempted to excavate the site in 1905, however this attempt failed due to the rainy season preventing work. He returned the next year in 1906, and attempted to excavate the site using dynamite. He had to abandon the attempt due to medical symptoms caused by the inhalation of the fumes. Prodgers wrote a book describing his experiences in Bolivia, entitled: Adventures in Bolivia.

Dr. Edgar Sanders, a Swiss adventurer born in Russia who was living in London, became obsessed with finding this treasure. Sanders initially learned about the legend from a document given to him by Prodgers. Sanders claimed that he had located the site near a former Jesuit colony known as Inquisivi. He also claimed to have found hundreds of skulls nearby, which according to the local natives, belonged to native slaves who worked to dig the tunnels and were executed to prevent them from spreading knowledge of the gold. Sanders contracted a German scientist named Charles Gladitz to confirm that gold was present at the site. Afterwards, Sanders made two failed expeditions to find the treasure in 1925 and 1926. He would contact Alan Hillgarth, a British intelligence agent and adventure novelist, in 1928. Sanders worked with Hillgarth to form the Sacambaya Exploration Company, with the goal of finding the treasure. They recruited 24 men for their mission, and took with them 40 tons of equipment for their expedition. They arrived at the region in March, and found it to be a dangerous area with insects, snakes, extremely hot temperatures at day, and extremely cold temperatures at night. This expedition had been abandoned by November, and the company had been disbanded by 1930.

In the 1960s, Mark Howell and Tony Morrison made another attempt to excavate Sacambaya. They arrived with "field distortion locating equipment," which is a device similar to a metal detector. Howell and Morrison only found a trapezoidal copper plate, which potentially originated from the Sanders expedition. After a downpour of rain Howell and Morrison canceled their expedition.

In 2018, a reality television series produced by MAK Pictures for the Discovery Channel premiered with an eight-episode season of its show Treasure Quest: Snake Island. In this series, an expedition led by Shawn Cowles, accompanied by Jeremy Whalen and Jack Peters, searched for the treasure based on directions provided by Johnny Irwin from the 1990 expedition.

== See also ==
- Amutara River
- List of rivers of Bolivia
