= Pakawara language =

Panoan language of Bolivia

Pacahuara
- Native to: Bolivia
- Region: Magdalena
- Ethnicity: 161 Pacahuara (2012)
- Native speakers: 3 (2018)
- Language family: Panoan: Mainline Panoan; Nawa; Bolivian; Chácobo; Pacahuara

Official status
- Official language in: Bolivia

Language codes
- ISO 639-3: pcp
- Glottolog: paca1246

Pacawara (Pacahuara) is a nearly extinct dialect of the Panoan Chácobo language. The Pacahuara have been located to northwest of Magdalena, Beni, Bolivia and to Nueva Esperanza municipality, of Federico Román Province in Pando. Pacahuara is recognized as an official language of Bolivia by the 2009 Bolivian Constitution.

A recent report shows how their culture is on the brink of disappearing.
