= Chayanta Municipality =

- Municipality
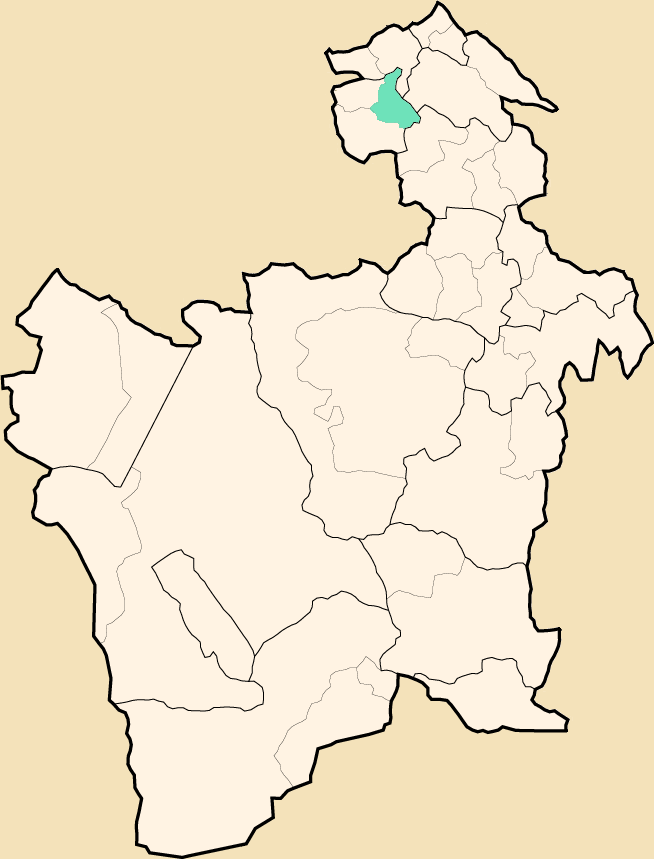
- Location within Potosí Department

- Location within Bolivia
- Coordinates: 18°25′S 66°23′W
- Country: Bolivia
- Department: Potosí Department
- Province: Rafael Bustillo Province
- Seat: Chayanta

Population (2001)
  - Total: 14,165
  - Ethnicities: Quechua
- Time zone: UTC-4 (BOT)

Chayanta Municipality is the second municipal section of the Rafael Bustillo Province in the Bolivian Potosí Department. It was created on October 8, 1908, during the presidency of Ismael Montes and is now one of four (until June 2009: three) municipalities of the province. Its seat is Chayanta.

== Location ==
Chayanta Municipality is situated in the north of the Potosí Department. To the north and north east it is bordered by the Alonso de Ibáñez Province, to the east by the Charcas Province and the Chayanta Province, to the south and south west by the Uncía Municipality and to the west and north west by the Llallagua Municipality.

== Cantons ==
The municipality is divided into nine cantons:

- Amayapampa Canton, created December 27, 1899
- Amaya Canton, created December 1, 1865
- Chayanta Canton, created December 1, 1865
- Ch'iwta Qala Qala Canton (Chiuta Cala Cala), created January 24, 1969
- Quwataka Canton (Coataca), created December 6, 1962
- Irupata Canton, created December 21, 1988
- Nueva Qulcha Canton (Nueva Colcha / Qollcha), created November 9, 1992
- Phana Kachi Canton, created December 1, 1865
- Río Verde Quila Quila Canton, created January 15, 1963

== Geography ==
Chayanta Municipality lies in a mainly mountainous region with heights between 2,960 m and 4,364 m the highest mountain being Lawqi Q'asa in Paya Pampa. Some of the highest elevations are Llachusaya (4,294 m), Lichusaya (4,254), Apillpiña (4,236 m), Qutani (4,126 m), Suritinisa (4,100 m), Apachita (4,023 m), Jirapampa (4,005 m), Chisi Raya (3,970 m), Marka Qullu (3,943 m) and Uyu Jisk'a Qala (3.885 m).

The lowest elevations are in the river basins of Chayanta River and Ch'iwta River (2,960 m) at their confluence.

== Population ==
The 2001 census stated a population of 14,165 inhabitants in the Chayanta Municipality. Some of the most populated places are:

- in Amayapampa Canton: Amayapampa (837)
- in Aymaya Canton: Amaya (513)
- in Chayanta Canton: Chayanta (2,072 inhabitants), Entre Ríos (468), Llallawita (202)
- in Quwataka Canton: Quwataka (574), Qaluqsa (Calojsa) (126)
- in Irupata Canton: Irupata (298), Chayanta Qala Qala (289), Pata Pata (176), Wink'i (162)
- in Nueva Qullcha Canton: Pichata (414)
- in Phana Kachi Canton: Q'upana (571), Phana Kachi (449), Qayu Qayu (183), Ch'akiri (Chaqueri) (169)

Life expectancy of a newborn is 51 years, literacy among the over-15-year old is 63%, and 85% of the population is rural.

The people are predominantly indigenous citizens of Quechua descent.

Ethnic group	%
Quechua	87.8
Aymara	9.8
Guaraní, Chiquitos, Moxos	0.0
Not indigenous	2.2
Other indigenous groups	0.1
