= Chácobo language =

Panoan language

Chácobo
- Native to: Bolivia
- Region: Beni Department
- Ethnicity: c.1,600–2,000 Chacobo (2018)
- Native speakers: c. 1,400 (2018)
- Language family: Panoan: Mainline Panoan; Nawa; Bolivian; Chácobo

Official status
- Official language in: Bolivia

Language codes
- ISO 639-3: cao
- Glottolog: chac1251
- ELP: Chácobo

Chácobo is a Panoan language spoken by about 1,400 out of the 1600 to 2000 Chácobo people of the Beni Department northwest of Magdalena, Bolivia. Chácobo children are learning the language as a first language.

== Geographical distribution ==
Most speakers of Chacobo live in their Native Community Lands (Tierra Comunitaria de Origen, TCO), spanning 500,000 hectares in the Beni department of Bolivia. They are estimated to number 1,400. Beginning in the 1990s, many of them have moved to the town of Riberalta, around 100 kilometers north of the Chacobo TCO, where about 300 to 400 now live.

== Classification ==
It is closely related to, and may form a dialect group with, the moribund Pakawara language, spoken by only three people as of 2018, though mutual intelligibility is low, as well as the extinct Karipuna, also called Jaunavô (Jau-Navo, Jaũn Àvo) and Éloe. (This Karipuna is distinct from the Karipuna language of Rondônia, a Tupian language, also spoken in Brazil.)

Several unattested extinct languages were reported to have been related, perhaps dialects. These include Capuibo and Sinabo/Shinabo of the Mamoré River. However, nothing is actually known of these purported languages.

== History ==
It is unclear whether or not the Chacobo are identical to the Pacahuara of historical records. In 1767, Lorenzo Hervás described the Pacabara language as spoken in San Borja, south of the current location fo Chacobo and Pakawara. The name Chacobo itself is first mentioned in 1845 by explorer José Agustin Palacios.

== Status ==
Most Chacobo live in their own communities, maintaining a traditional way of life and teaching the language to children as a first language. Outsiders are generally forbidden from living in the villages, unless they are teahers or married to a Chacobo. Most Chacobo people living in Riberalta do not speak the language, however. It is one of 36 official languages of Bolivia.

== Phonology ==
=== Consonants ===
	Bilabial	Alveolar	Retroflex	Post-alv./ Palatal	Velar	Glottal
Nasal	m	n				
Stop	p	t			k	ʔ
Affricate		t͡s		t͡ʃ		
Fricative	β	s	ʂ	ʃ		h
Tap			ɽ			
Approximant	w			j		

- Sounds /t͡ʃ, ʃ/ may also be heard as palatalized [t͡ʃʲ, ʃʲ] when before vowels in free variation.
- /k/ may be heard as a voiced fricative [ɣ] when in between the positions of /ɨ/.
- /t͡ʃ/ assimilates to a retroflex [t͡ʂ] when /ʂ/ is in the following syllable.
- /n/ can be heard as [ɲ] as a realization of the sequence /ni/.

=== Vowels ===
	Front	Central	Back
High	i	ɨ	o
Mid			o
Low		a	

- /o/ may be heard as [u] when occurring within the environment of high vowels.

== Vocabulary ==
Some Chácobo words are given below.

=== Numerals ===
Chácobo	Gloss
nicatsu	1
dafuira	2
unamarana	3
atchayuna	4
chayuna	5

=== Pronouns ===
Chácobo	Gloss
hiasro	I
miani	you
zonihua	he/she/it/they
noquirzo	we
zunimato	you (pl.)

=== Vocabulary ===
Chácobo	Gloss
chii	fire
huisruhuaina	rain
jini	water
mai	earth
oriquiti	food
osse	moon
rsepo	chicha
rsiqui	maize
vari	sun
vistima	star
