= Chipiriri River =

River in Bolivia

Coordinates: 16°58′09″S 65°23′40″W

Chipiriri

Location
- Country: Bolivia
- Region: Cochabamba Department

The Chipiriri River is a river of Bolivia.

== See also ==
- List of rivers of Bolivia
