= Cañón Verde River =

Location
- Country: Bolivia

The Cañón Verde River is a river of Bolivia. It flows into the Parapetí River, and its entire course lies within the department of Chuquisaca.

== See also ==
- List of rivers of Bolivia
