= Río de la Fortuna =

River in Bolivia

Coordinates: 16°36′S 58°46′W

Location
- Country: Bolivia

The Río de la Fortuna is a river of Bolivia.

== See also ==
- List of rivers of Bolivia
