= San Matéo River (Ichilo River tributary) =

San Matéo River (Ichilo River)

Location
- Country: Bolivia

The San Matéo River (Ichilo River) is a river in Bolivia.

== See also ==
- List of rivers of Bolivia
