= San Pedro River (Bolivia) =

River in Bolivia

Location
- Country: Bolivia
- Region: Chuquisaca Department, Potosí Department

Physical characteristics
- Mouth: Río Grande
  - coordinates: 18°25′06″N 65°20′44″W

Basin features
- Tributaries
  - right: Chayanta River, Río Exaltación

The San Pedro River is a river of Bolivia in the Chuquisaca Department and in the Potosí Department. It flows to Río Grande.

== See also ==
- List of rivers of Bolivia
- Puruma River
