= Camacho River =

Coordinates: 21°40′S 64°38′W

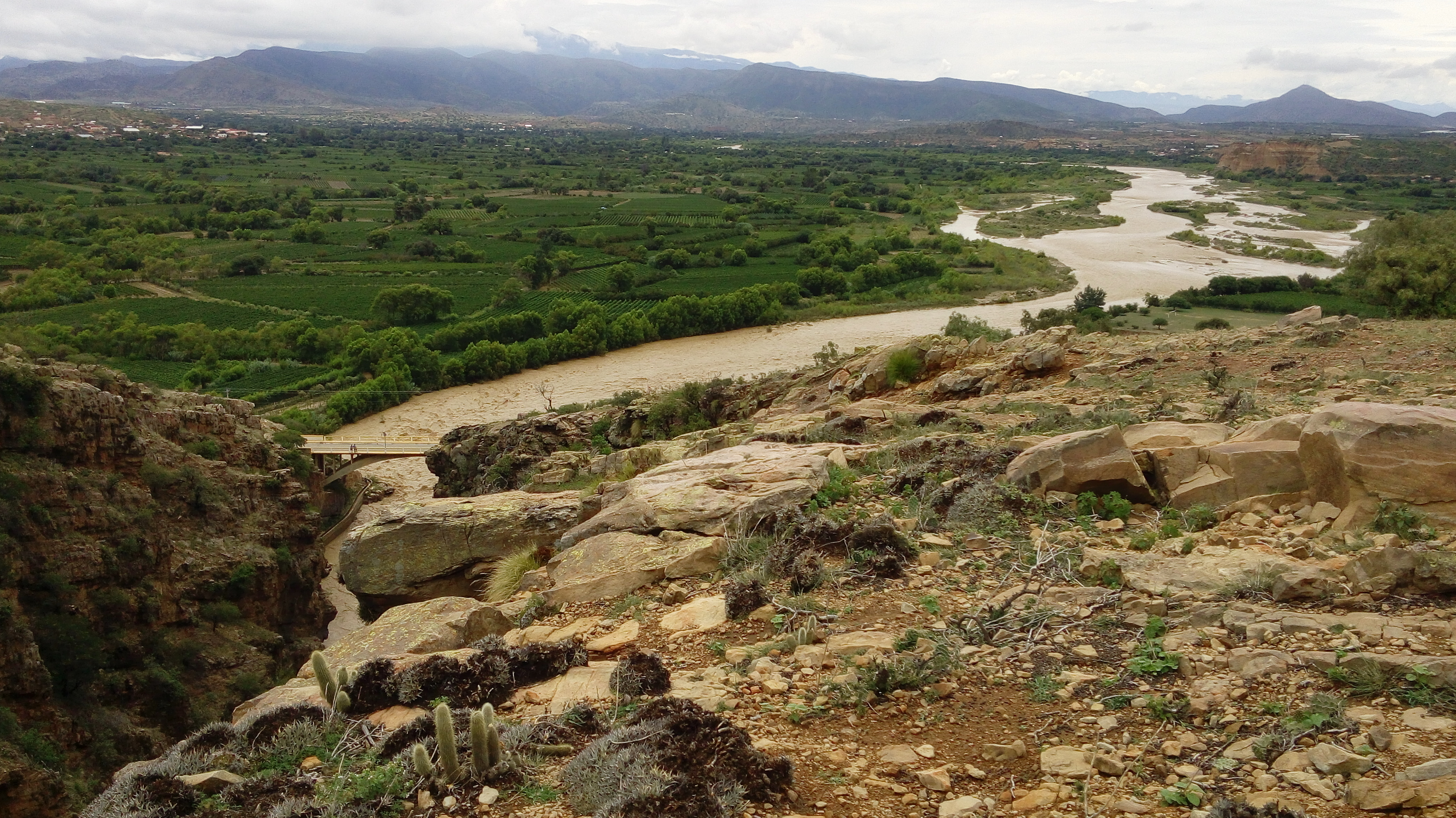

Location
- Country: Bolivia

Physical characteristics
- Mouth
  - location: Río Grande de Tarija

The Camacho River (Spanish, Río Camacho) is a river of Bolivia. It is a tributary of the Río Grande de Tarija, which in turn flows into the Bermejo River and the Paraguay River.

== See also ==
- List of rivers of Bolivia
