= Ibare River =

Coordinates: 14°44′47″S 64°57′40.3″W

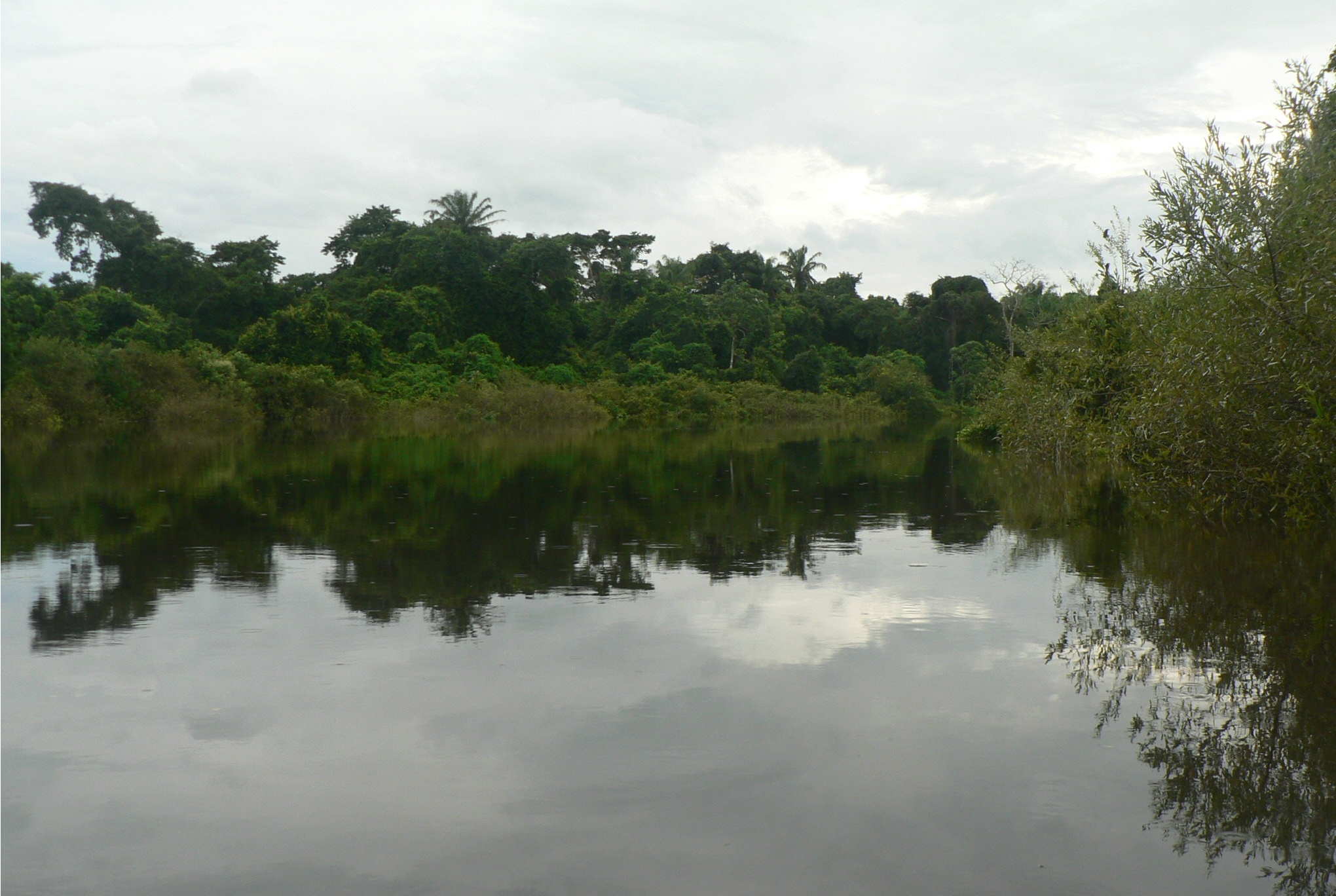

Location
- Country: Bolivia

The Ibare River is a river of Bolivia.

== See also ==
- List of rivers of Bolivia
