= San Geronimo River =

Location
- Country: Bolivia

The San Geronimo River is a river in Bolivia.

== See also ==
- List of rivers of Bolivia
