= Ayopaya River =

Coordinates: 16.9964°S 66.9992°W

Location
- Country: Bolivia

The Ayopaya River is a river of Bolivia.

== See also ==
- List of rivers of Bolivia
