= Urqu Jawira (Pedro Domingo Murillo) =

- Location in Bolivia
- Etymology: Aymara

Location
- Country: Bolivia
- Region: La Paz Department, Pedro Domingo Murillo Province

Urqu Jawira (Aymara urqu male, jawira river, "male river", Hispanicized spellings Orkojahuira, Orkojawira) is a river in Bolivia in the La Paz Department, Pedro Domingo Murillo Province. It originates in the Wayllari mountain range. On its way to Choqueyapu River it crosses the city La Paz from north to south in the Putu Putu or Miraflores district.

== See also ==
- List of rivers of Bolivia
