= Abunã =

District in Porto Velho, Brazil

Abunã is district in Porto Velho, the capital of Rondônia, Brazil. It is situated in the Amazon Basin on the right bank of the Madeira River 10 kilometres (6.2 mi) upstream from its confluence with the Abuna River. The Abuna River and the Madeira River upstream from their confluence mark the boundary between Brazil and Bolivia, and so Abunã is across the river from the Bolivia.
