= Callama River =

Location
- Country: Bolivia
- Region: Potosí Department

The Callama River is a river in the Potosí Department of Bolivia.

== See also ==
- List of rivers of Bolivia
