= Márquez River =

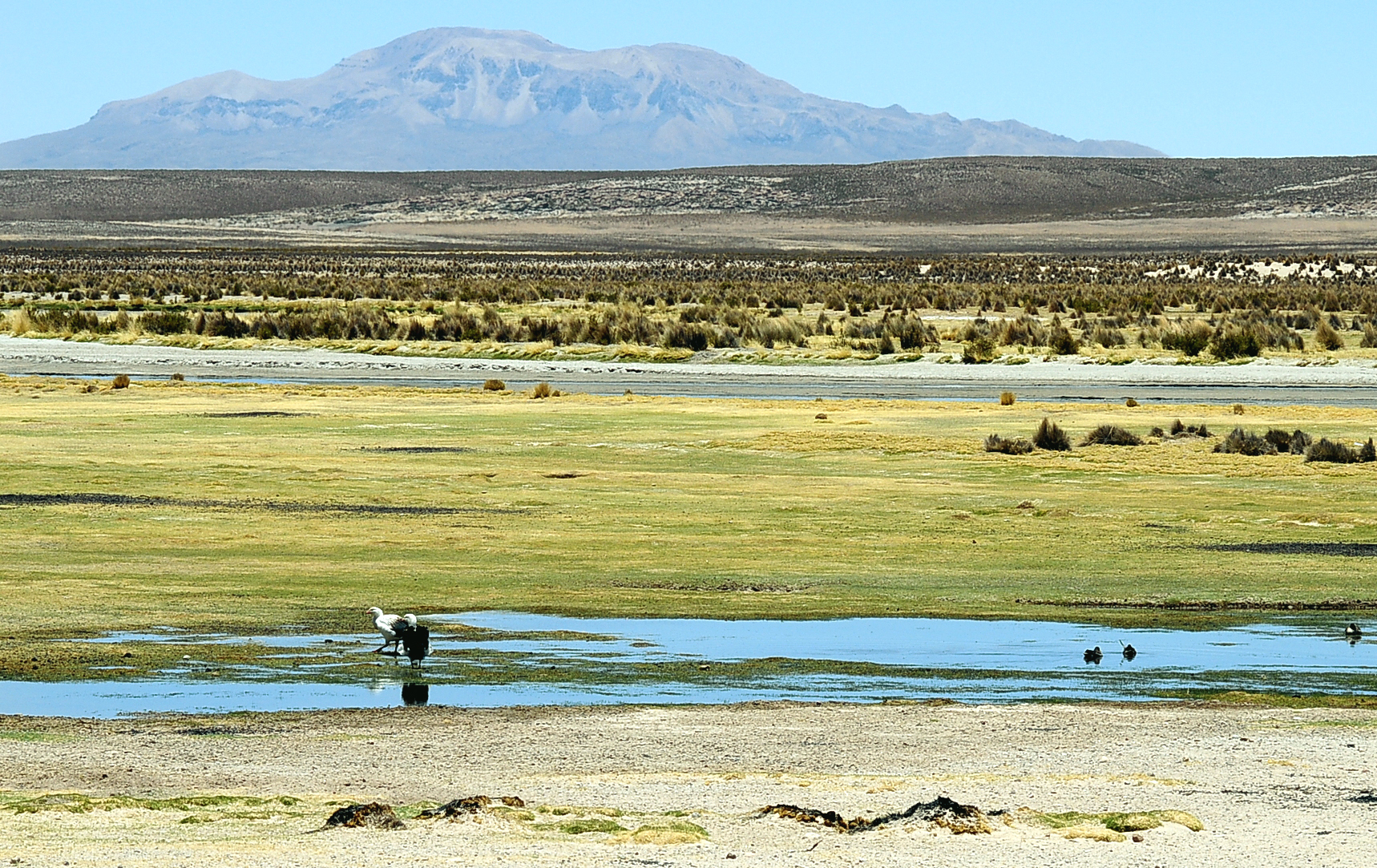

Location
- Country: Bolivia

The Márquez River is a river of Bolivia in the Oruro Department. It empties into Poopo Lake in the southern part of the lake.

== See also ==
- List of rivers of Bolivia
