= Boopi River =

Coordinates: 15.6756°S 67.1367°W

Location
- Country: Bolivia

The Boopi River is a river of Bolivia.

== See also ==
- List of rivers of Bolivia
