= Sajama River =

Coordinates: 18.5261°S 68.7372°W

Location
- Country: Bolivia

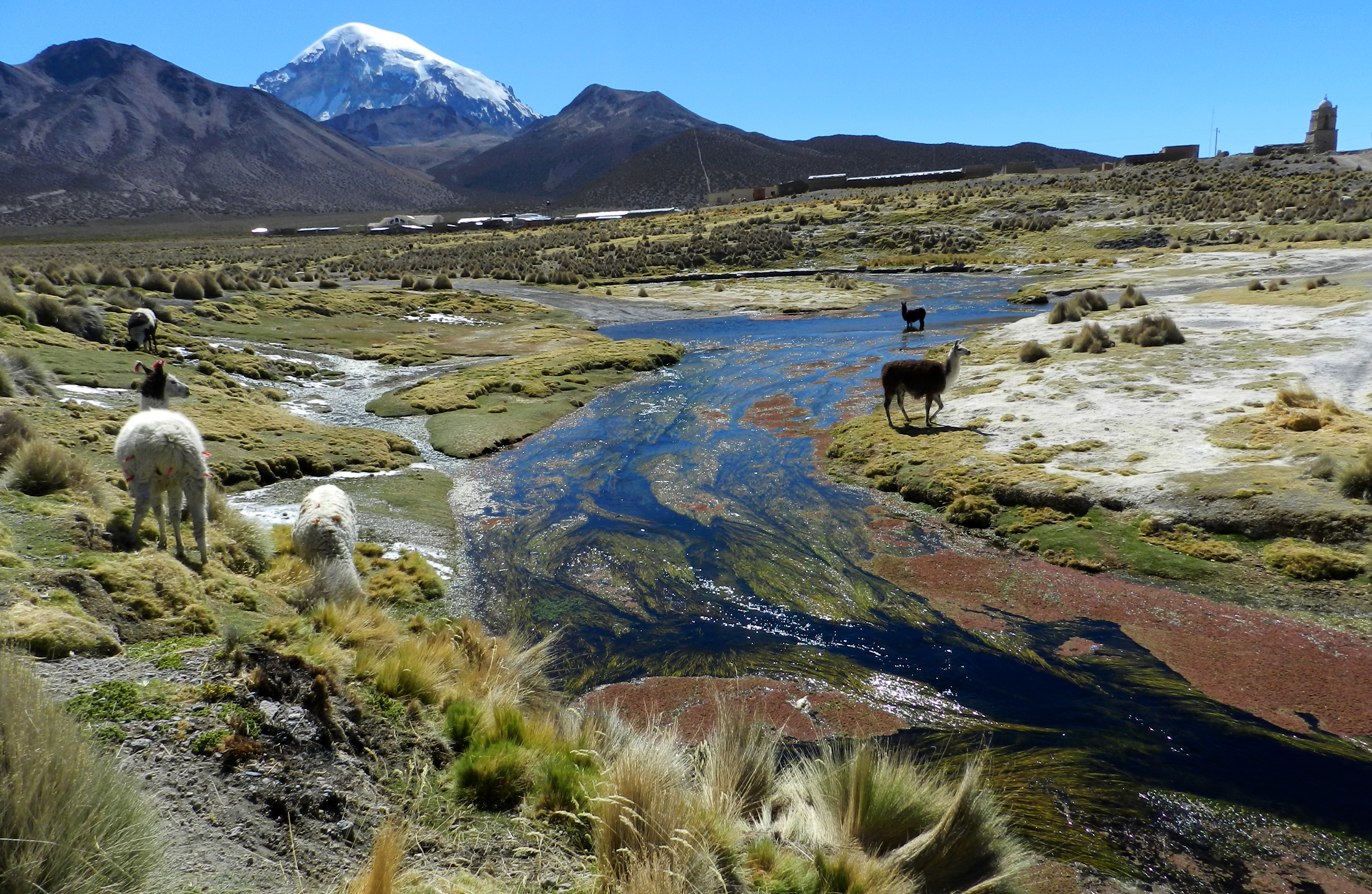

The Sajama River is a river of Bolivia.

== See also ==
- List of rivers of Bolivia
