= Manuripi River =

Manuripi
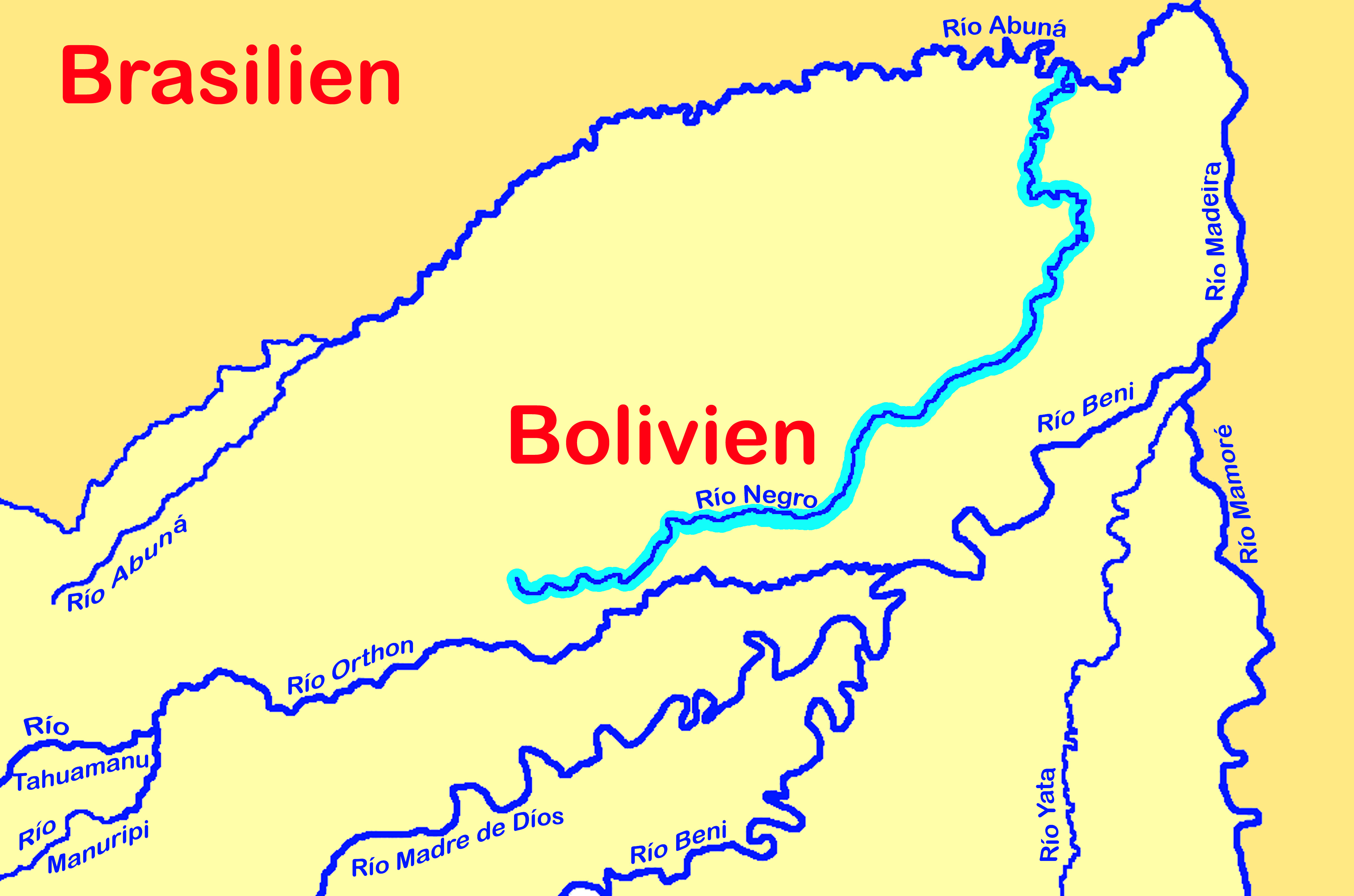

Location
- Countries: Bolivia, Peru
- Regions: Madre de Dios Region (Peru); Pando Department (Bolivia)

Physical characteristics
- Mouth: Orthon River
  - coordinates: 11°6′15″S 67°33′33″W

The Manuripi River is a river in Bolivia and Peru.

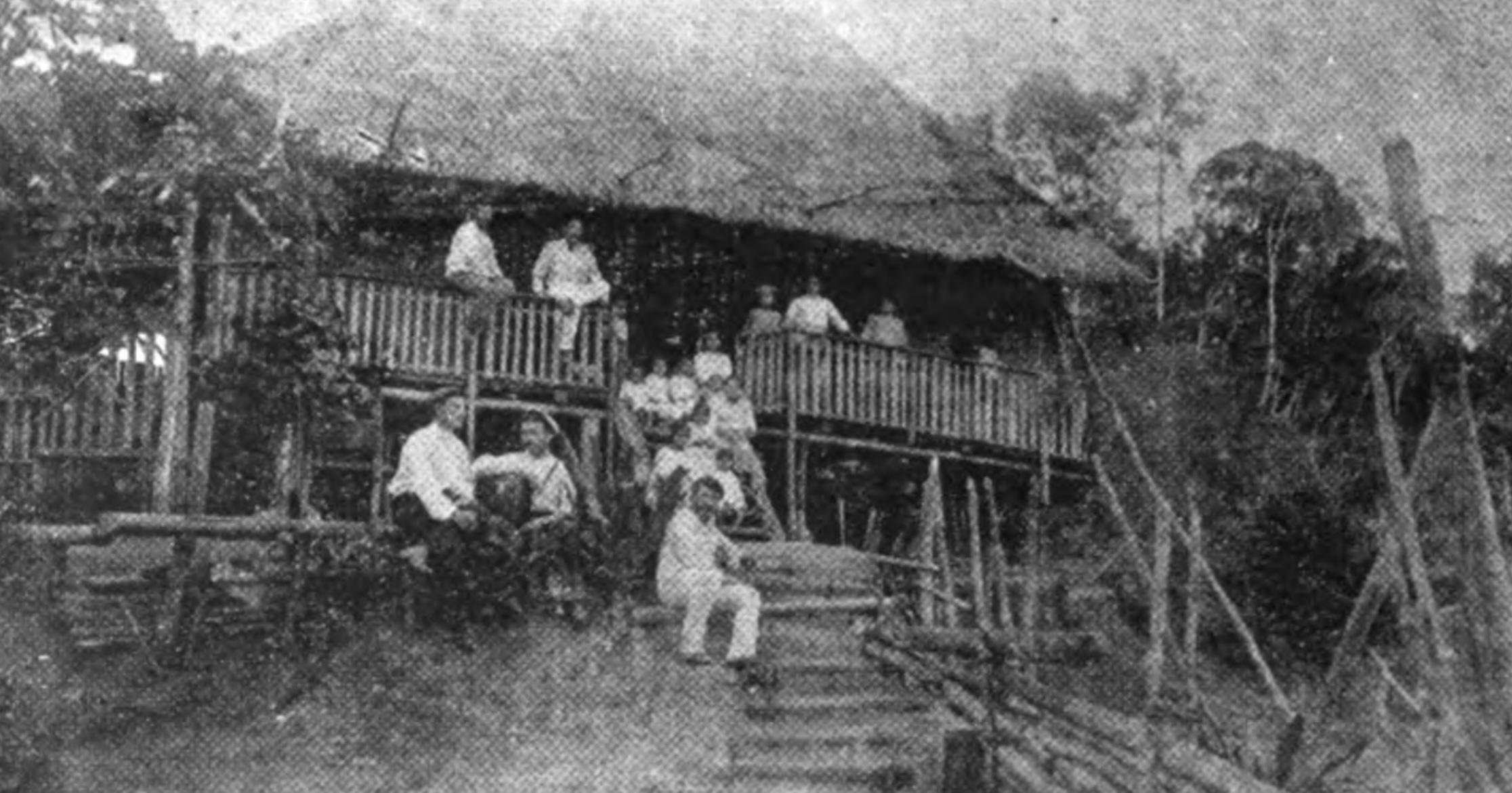
Puesto Venecia, an estate belonging to Maximo Rodriguez on the Manuripe River.

== See also ==
- List of rivers of Bolivia
- List of rivers of Peru
