= Quizer River =

Coordinates: 16.47544°S 62.46927°W

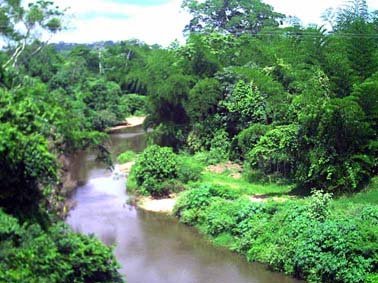

Location
- Country: Bolivia

The Quizer River is a river of Bolivia.

== See also ==
- List of rivers of Bolivia
