= Azero River =

Location
- Country: Bolivia

The Azero River is a river of Bolivia in the Chuquisaca Department.

== See also ==
- List of rivers of Bolivia
