= Laq'a Jawira =

Coordinates: 19.2967°S 67.9553°W

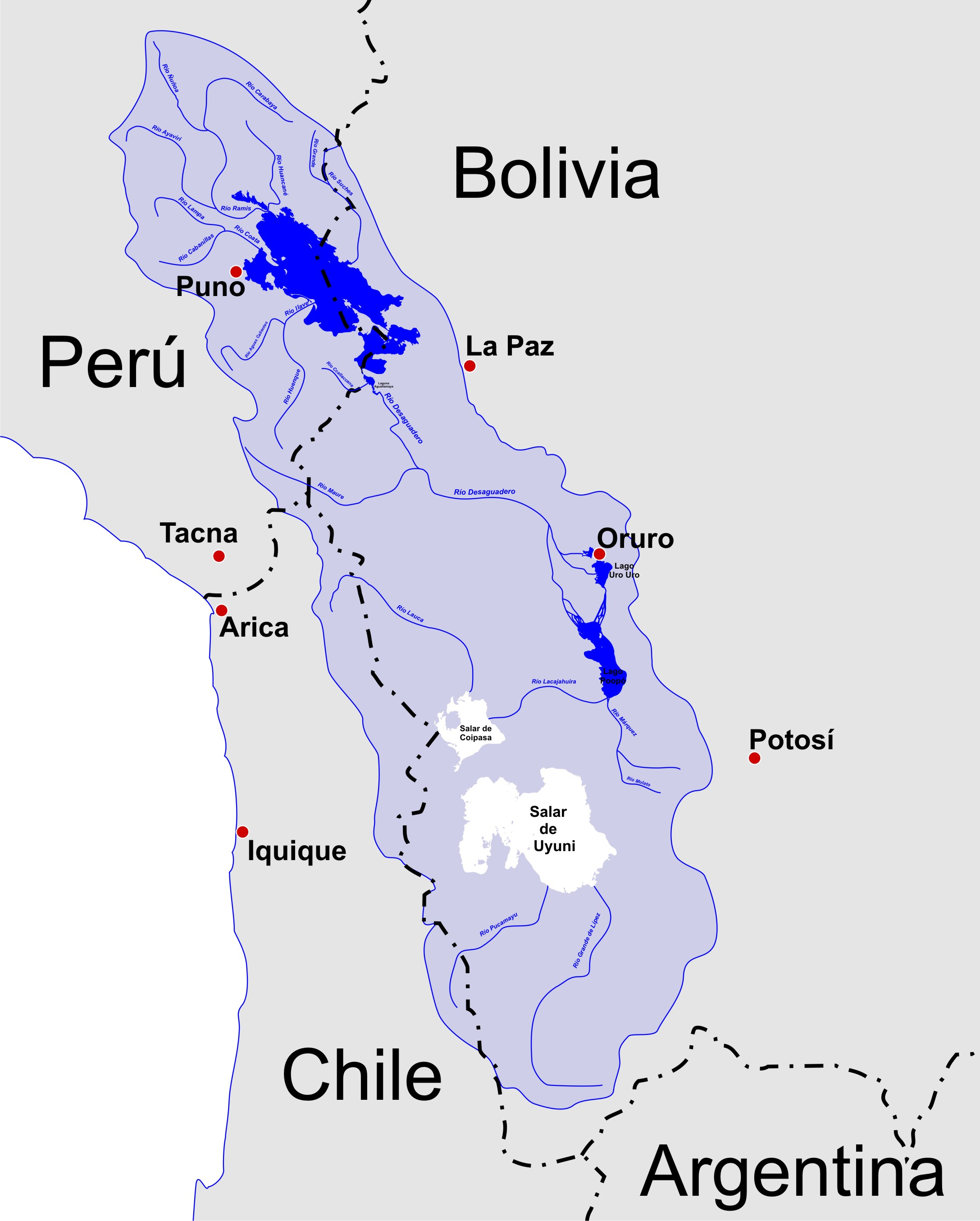
- The Lake Titicaca / Desaguadero River / Lake Poopó / Coipasa salt lake basin
- Etymology: Aymara

Location
- Country: Bolivia
- Region: Oruro Department

Laq'a Jawira (Aymara laq'a earth (soil), jawira river, "earth river"; hispanicized spellings: Laca Jahuira / Lacajahuira) is a river in Bolivia which runs from Lake Poopó. Its length is entirely within the territory of Oruro Department.

It runs from the extreme south-west of the lake, and heads west-south-west. It has a length of 135 kilometres, after which it is lost in the salar de Coipasa.

Its waters are salty at the point at which it meets the lake.

== See also ==
- List of rivers of Bolivia
