= Guanay =

Bolivian town

Coordinates: 15.4978°S 67.8794°W

Guanay is a small town on the Tipuani River in the Yungas region of Bolivia. It is the seat of the Guanay Municipality, the second municipality of the Larecaja Province.

Guanay and the nearby town of Tipuani are at the end of El Camino del Oro (the Gold Digger's Trail) from Sorata. There is still gold mining activity in the Guanay–Tipuani area.

The Tipuani River is a tributary to the Beni River. It is possible to travel by boat from Guanay to Rurrenabaque.
