= Maniqui River =

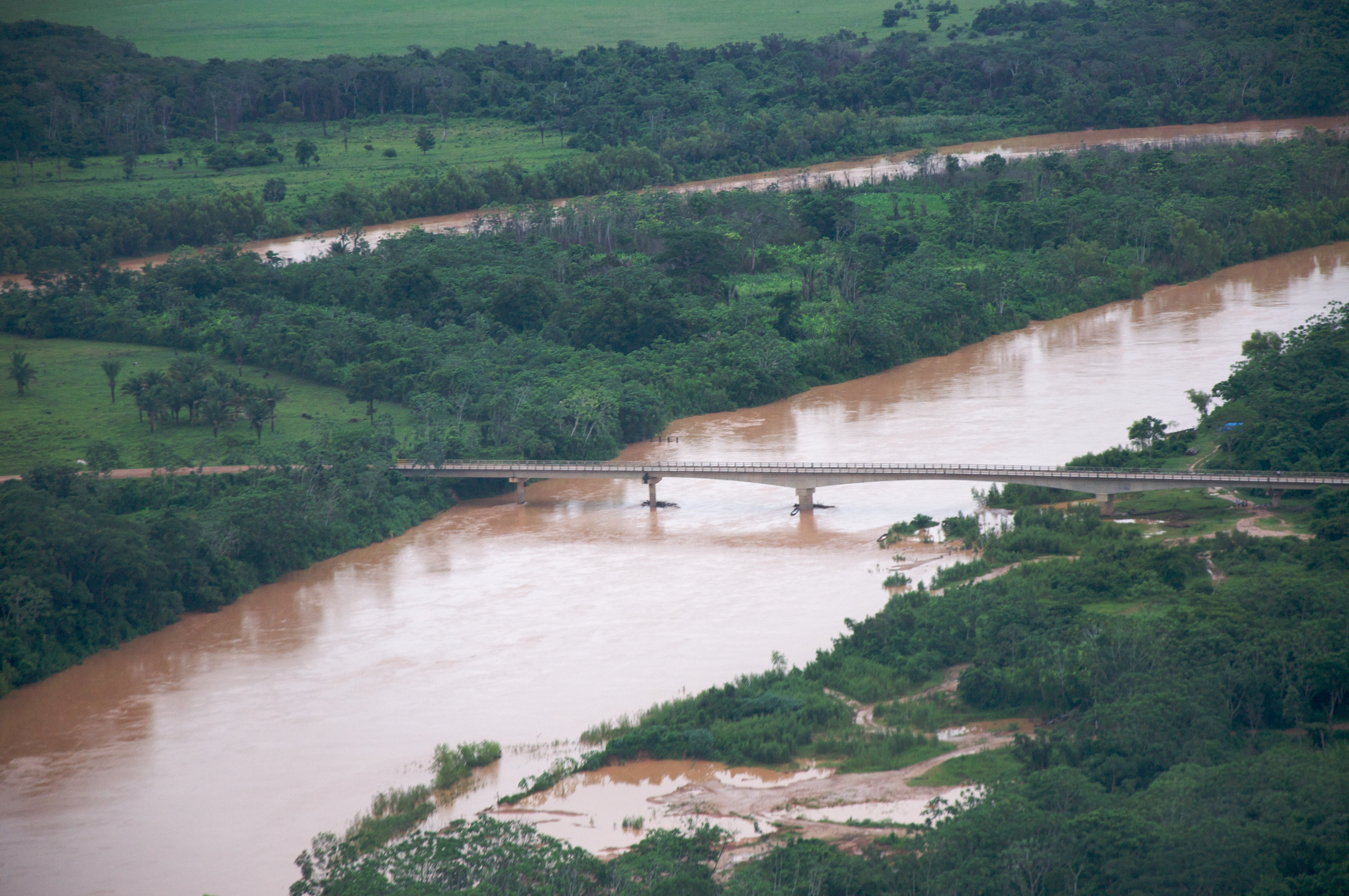

Location
- Country: Bolivia

The Maniqui River is a river of Bolivia.

== See also ==
- List of rivers of Bolivia
