= San Cristóbal River =

Location
- Country: Bolivia

The San Cristóbal River is a river in Bolivia.

== See also ==
- List of rivers of Bolivia
