= Colquiri River =

Location
- Country: Bolivia

The Colquiri River is a river of Bolivia in the La Paz Department.

== See also ==
- List of rivers of Bolivia
