= Claro River (Bolivia) =

Location
- Country: Bolivia

The Claro River is a river of Bolivia.

== See also ==
- List of rivers of Bolivia
