= Paucerna River =

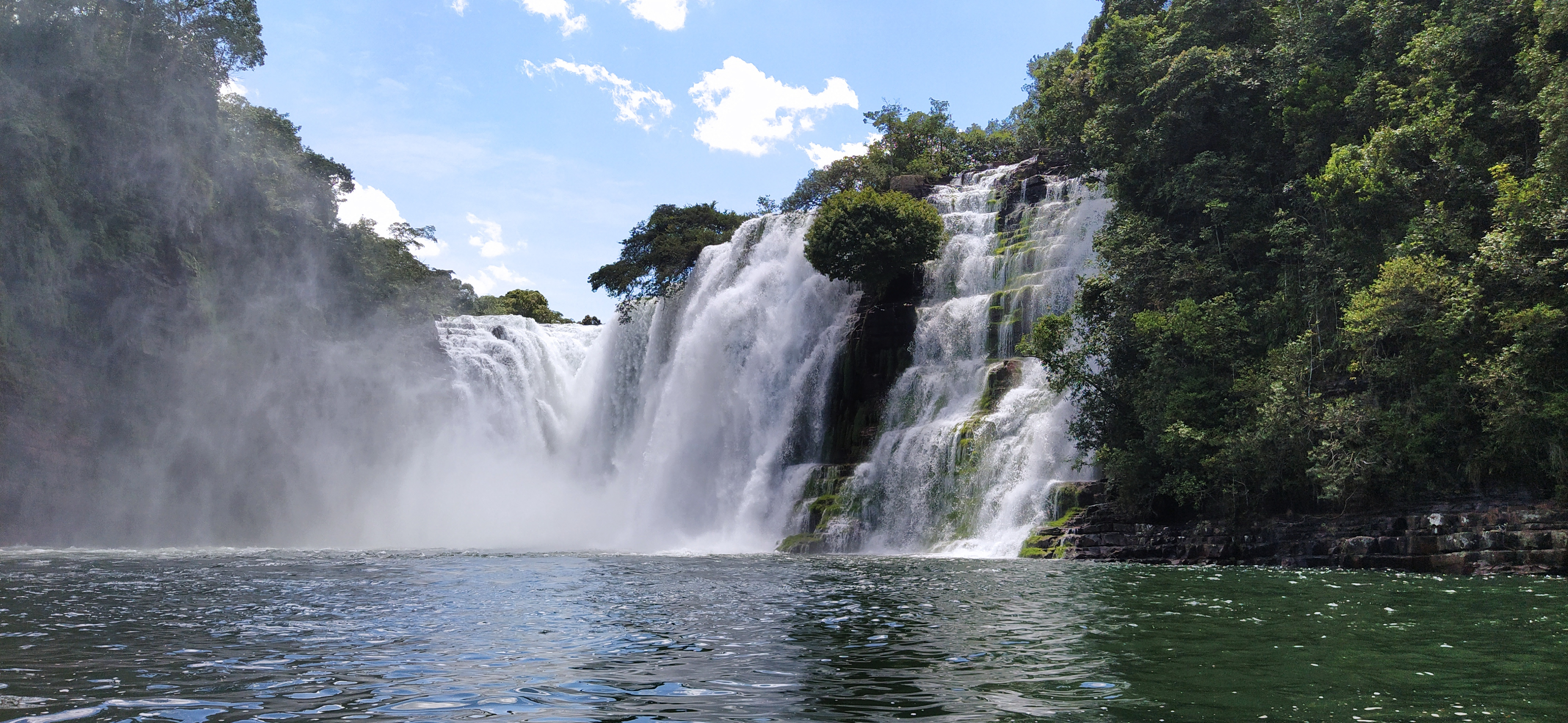

Location
- Country: Bolivia

Physical characteristics
- Mouth
  - location: Guaporé River
  - coordinates: 13°31′57″S 61°06′26″W

The Paucerna River is a river of Bolivia.

== See also ==
- List of rivers of Bolivia
