= Tijamuchi River =

Location
- Country: Bolivia

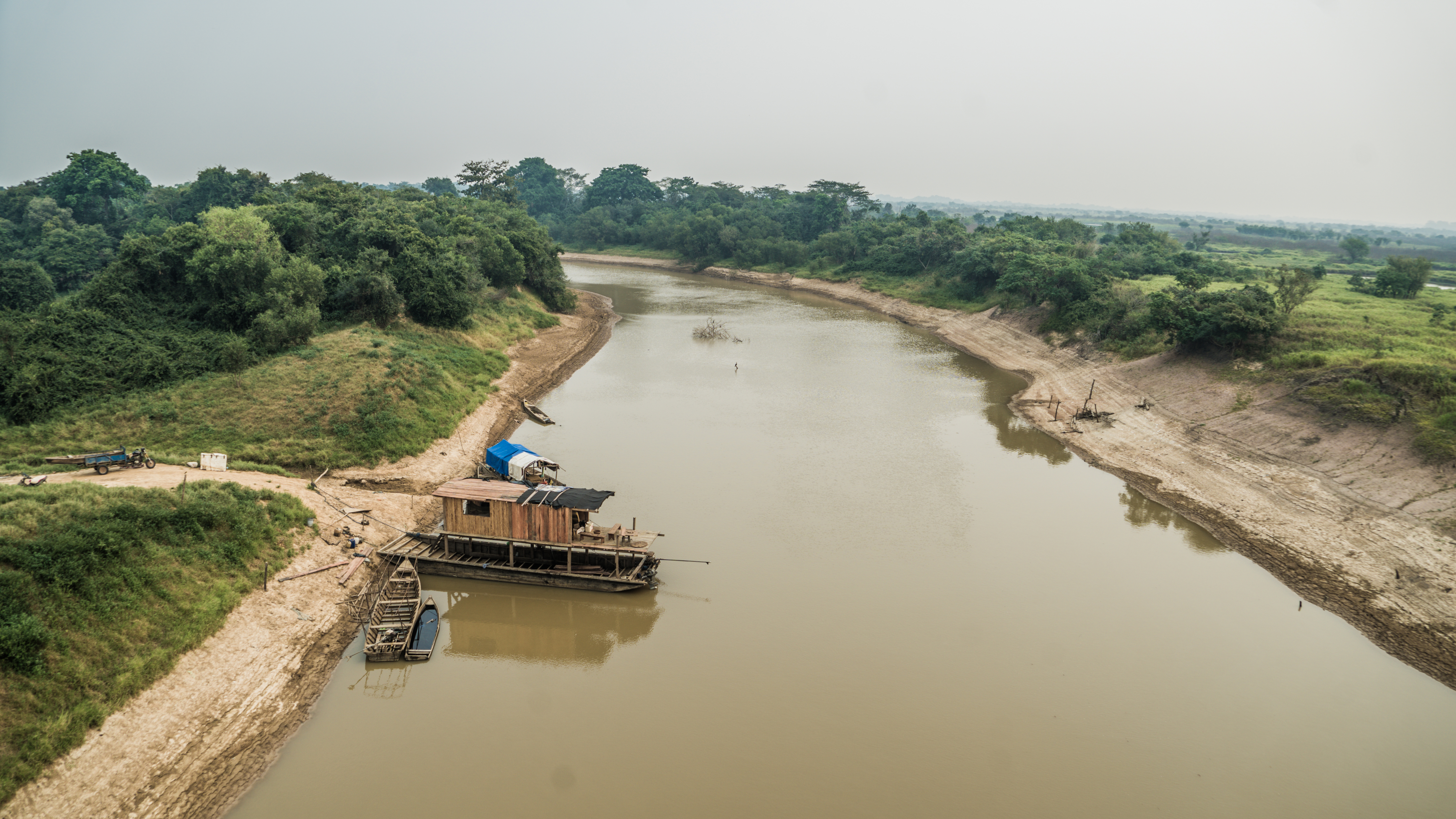
The Tijamuchi River in Beni, Bolivia

The Tijamuchi River is a river of Bolivia, located in the Beni department. It is known for its significant river dolphin (Inia geoffrensis) population.

== See also ==
- List of rivers of Bolivia
