= Altamachi River =

Coordinates: 16°13′40″S 66°34′10″W

Location
- Country: Bolivia
- Region: Cochabamba Department, Ayopaya Province, Chapare Province

The Altamachi River is a river in Bolivia. It flows through the Ayopaya Province and the Chapare Province of the Cochabamba Department.

== See also ==
- List of rivers of Bolivia
