= Muymano River =

Location
- Country: Bolivia

Physical characteristics
- Source
  - elevation: 250 m

The Muymano River is a river of Bolivia.

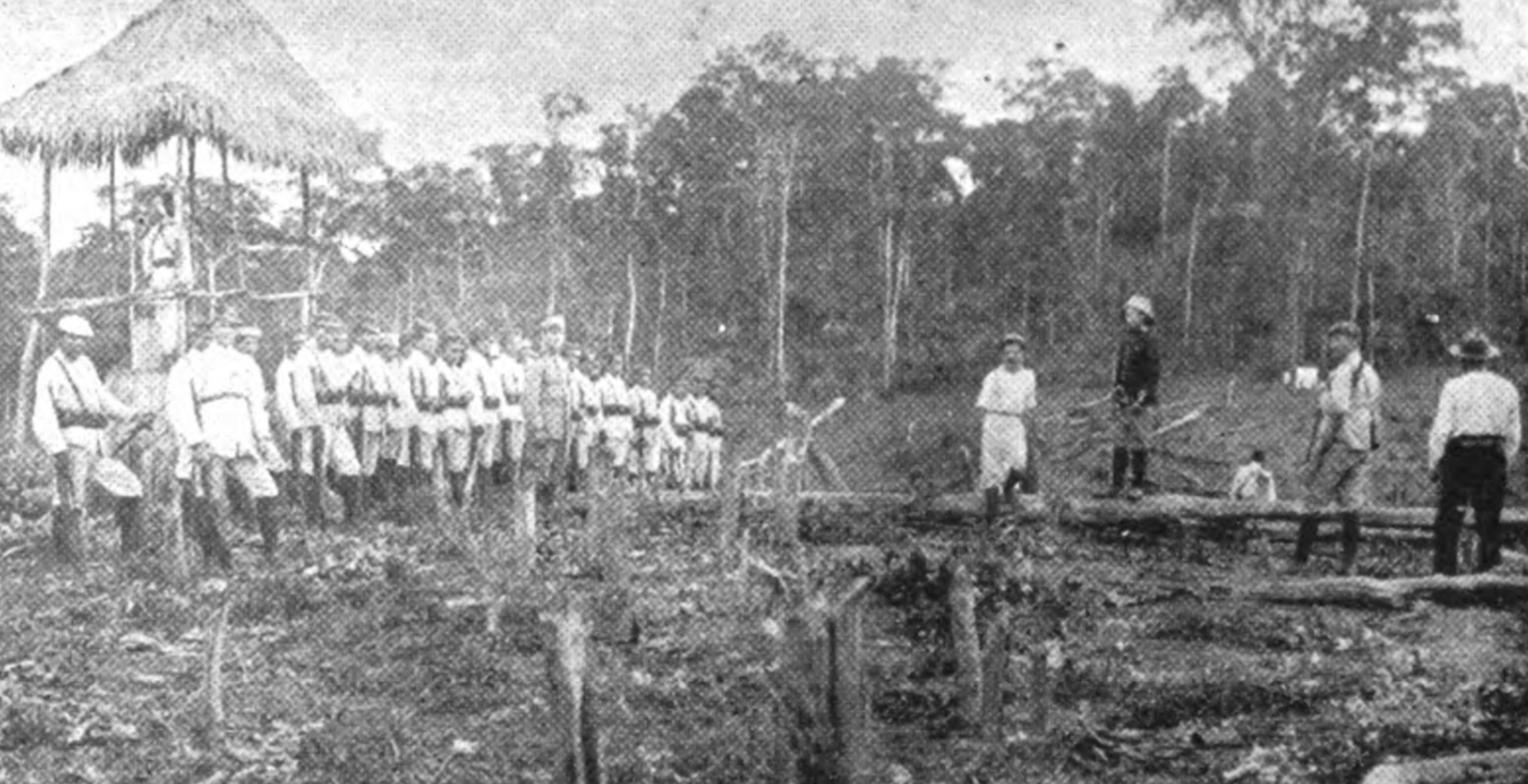
Peruvian garrison along the Muymano River. Photographed at puesto Firmeza, circa 1917.

== See also ==
- List of rivers of Bolivia
