= Coroico River =

Coordinates: 15.5008°S 67.8467°W

Coroica river
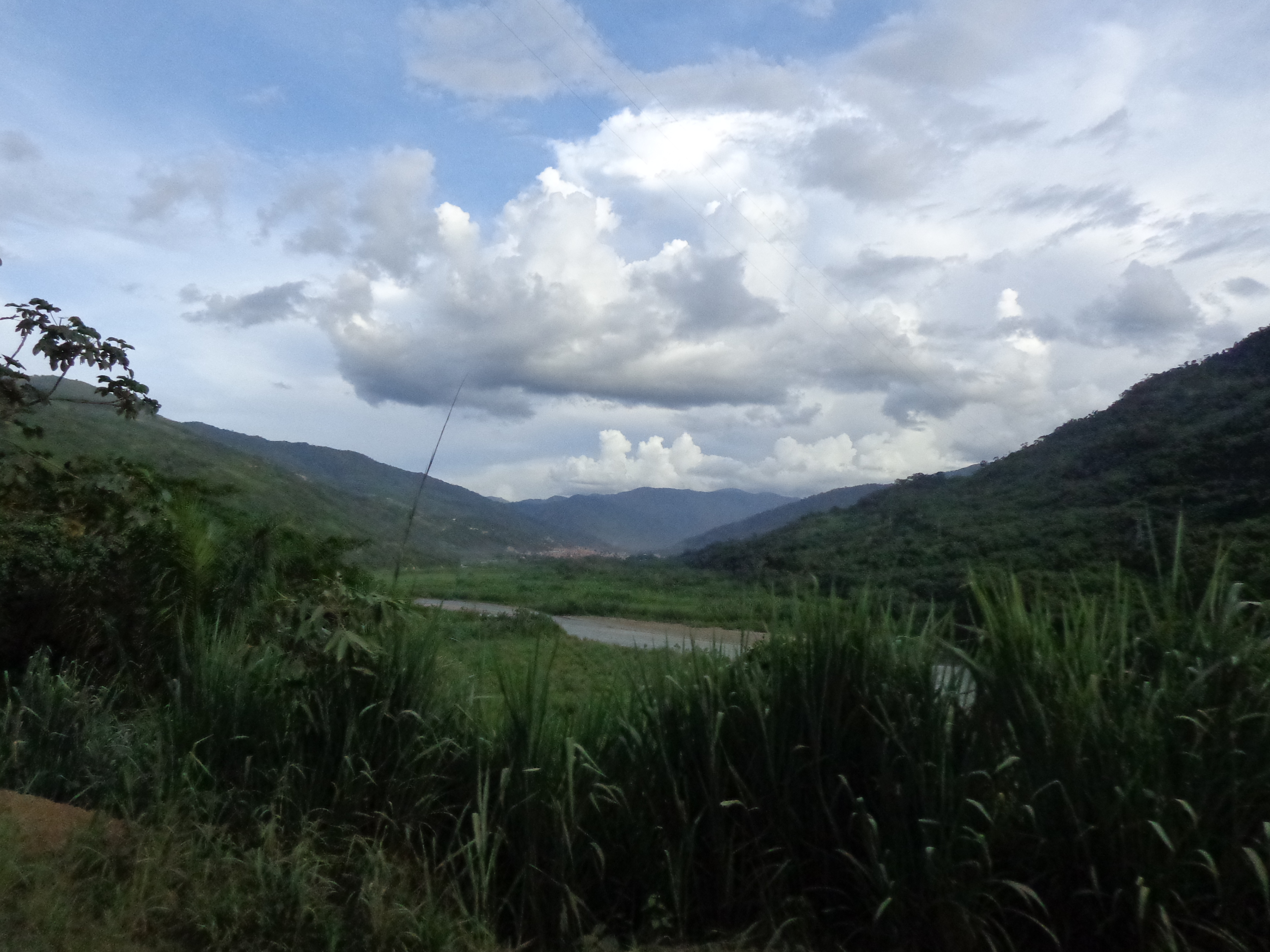

Location
- Country: Bolivia
- Region: La Paz Department

The Coroico River is a river of Bolivia. The catchment area comprises 5356 km². According to the 2012 census, it is home to 59 996 people.

== Economic activity ==
Economic activities along the river are impacting its water quality.

=== Agriculture ===
Agricultural along the river is using agrochemicals, which are contaminating the water.

=== Gold mining ===
Gold mining, mostly illegal, is difficult to control and leads to heavy pollution of the Río Coroico with mercury and other chemicals.

== Waste water and solid waste ==
Evergrowing settlements in the watershed are facing a huge challenge to build waste infrastructure. As a result, the river gets to take the waste.

=== Waste water ===
The wastewater from the most densely populated settlements is also discharged untreated into the Río Coroico.

=== Solid waste ===
The disposal of solid waste exceeds the capacity of the local waste disposal system. disposal exceeds the capacity of the local waste disposal system.

== See also ==
- List of rivers of Bolivia
