= Kaka River =

Coordinates: 15.35°S 68.05°W

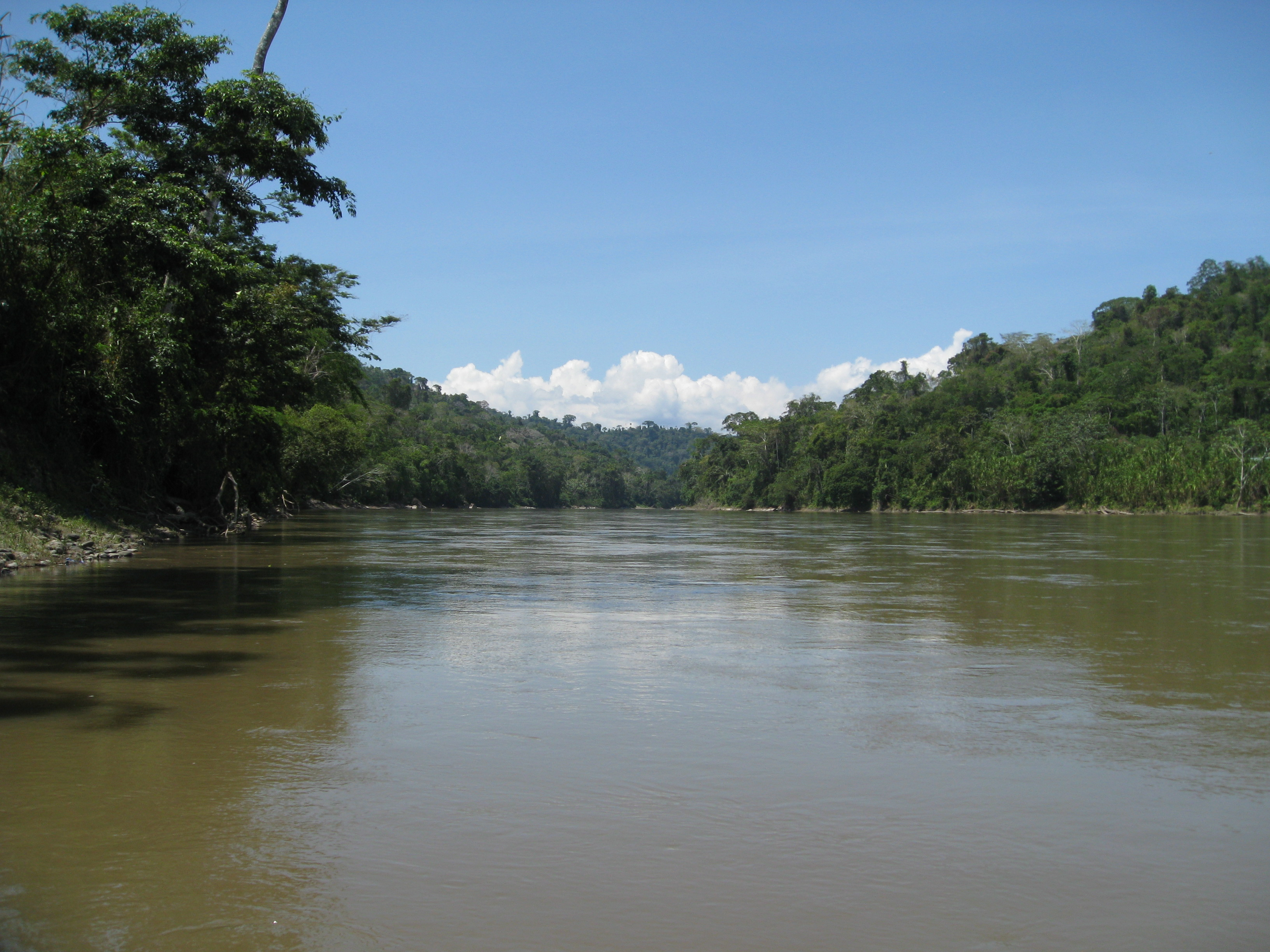

Location
- Country: Bolivia

The Kaka River is a river of Bolivia, that joins the Beni River in the Amazon basin. The two rivers join in the La Paz Department. The merged river soon joins up with the Beni River, which makes up the border of the Beni Department and La Paz Department of Bolivia. The Beni River later joins with the Madre de Dios River, which creates the Madeira River. Then the Madeira joins with the Ji-Paraná River. Finally, the Madeira joins into the Amazon River.

== See also ==
- List of rivers of Bolivia
