= Amutara River =

Coordinates: 17°4′59″S 67°1′59″W

Location
- Country: Bolivia

The Amutara River is a river of Bolivia in the La Paz Department.

== See also ==
- List of rivers of Bolivia
- Sacambaya River
