= List of rivers of Bolivia =

This is a list of rivers in Bolivia.

== By drainage basin ==
This list is arranged by drainage basin, with respective tributaries indented under each larger stream's name. Rivers longer than 400 miles (644 km) are in bold.

=== Rivers that reach the ocean ===
==== Amazon Basin ====
  - **Madeira River**
    - Abuná River
      - Río Negro
        - Pacahuaras River
      - Mapiri River
      - Rapirrán River
      - Chipamanu River
      - Xipamanu River
    - **Beni River** including Alto Beni
      - Orthon River
        - Tahuamanu River
          - Muymano River
        - Mamuripi River
          - Manuripe River
      - **Madre de Dios River**
        - Sena River
          - San Martín River
          - Manuripi River
        - Heath River
        - Tambopata River
      - Ivón River
      - Arroyo Verde
      - Madidi River
        - Esmeralda River
        - Claro River
      - Tuichi River
        - Yariapo River
        - Pelechuco River
      - Quiquibey River
      - Kaka River
        - Coroico River
          - Camata River
          - Zongo River
        - Mapiri River
          - Challana River
          - Tipuani River
          - Atén River
          - Consata River
            - San Cristóbal River
      - Boopi River
        - Tamapaya River
        - La Paz River
          - Choqueyapu River
      - Santa Elena River
        - Altamachi River
      - Cotacajes River
        - Río Negro
        - Sacambaya River
          - Amutara River
          - Ayopaya River
            - Colquiri River
            - Leque River
              - Sayarani River
              - Tallija River
    - **Mamoré River** including Mamorecillo
      - **Yata River**
        - Benicito River
      - **Iténez (Guaporé) River**
        - **Itonomas River** or San Miguel or San Julián or San Pablo
          - Machupo River
          - Quizer River
          - Parapetí River usually ends in the Bañados de Izozog depression
            - Cañón Verde River
          - Santa Bárbara River
        - **Río Blanco** or Baures or Agua Caliente
          - **San Martin River**
            - Negro River or San Joaquin
            - San Simón River
        - Paraguá River
          - San Ramón River
          - Tarvo River
        - Verde River
        - Paucerna River
      - San Agustín River
      - Yacuma River
        - Rápulo River
          - Maniqui River
        - San Geronimo River
        - Bio River
      - Apere River
        - Matos River
        - Curico River
      - Tijamuchi River
      - Ibare River
      - Isiboro River
        - Sécure River
          - Ichoa River
          - Chipiriri River
        - Tayota River
      - **Río Grande** or Guapay
        - Yapacaní River
          - Palacios River
          - Alturas del Yapacaní River
          - Surutú River
        - Paila River
        - Piray River
          - Bermejo River
          - Piojeras River
        - Azero River
        - Mizque River
          - Julpe River
        - Tomina River
        - Charobamba River
        - Chico River
        - San Pedro River
          - Chayanta River
        - Caine River
          - Arque River
          - Rocha River
      - Chapare River
        - Espíritu Santo River
        - San Matéo River
      - Ichilo River includes Alto Ichilo
        - Useuta River
        - Choré River
        - Ibabo River
        - Chimoré River
        - Sacta River
        - Víbora River
        - San Matéo River
        - Moija River
  - Purus River (Brazil)
    - **Acre River**

==== La Plata Basin ====
- Paraná River (Argentina)
  - **Paraguay River**
    - **Bermejo River**
      - Río Grande de Tarija
        - Itaú River
        - Tarija River
          - Salinas River
          - Camacho River
          - Guadalquivir River
    - **Pilcomayo River**
      - Pilaya River
        - San Juan del Oro River
          - Tupiza River
          - Tumusla River
            - Yura River
              - Callama River
              - San Juan River
            - Qaysa River
            - Cotagaita River
              - Río Blanco
            - Camargo River
        - Inka Wasi River
    - Parapetí River usually ends in the Bañados de Izozog depression
    - Bamburral River or Negro
      - Tucavaca River
      - San Rafael River
    - Curiche Grande River
      - Río de la Fortuna

=== Pacific Ocean ===
- Loa River (Chile)
  - San Pedro de Inacaliri River (Chile)
    - Silala River

=== Endorheic basins in the Altiplano ===
==== Poopó Lake ====
- Desaguadero River
  - Mauri River
  - Lake Titicaca
    - Suches River
- Márquez River

==== Lake Coipasa or Salar de Coipasa ====
- Laq'a Jawira
- Lauca River
  - Sajama River
- Sabaya River

==== Salar de Uyuni ====
- Puka Mayu
- Río Grande de Lipez
- Río Colorado
