= Cotacajes River =

Coordinates: 15.9358°S 66.8692°W

Location
- Country: Bolivia

The Cotacajes River is a river of Bolivia.

== See also ==
- List of rivers of Bolivia
