= Leque River =

Coordinates: 17.2975°S 66.8778°W

Location
- Country: Bolivia

The Leque River is a river of Bolivia.

== See also ==
- List of rivers of Bolivia
