= Abuna River =

River in the Amazon region

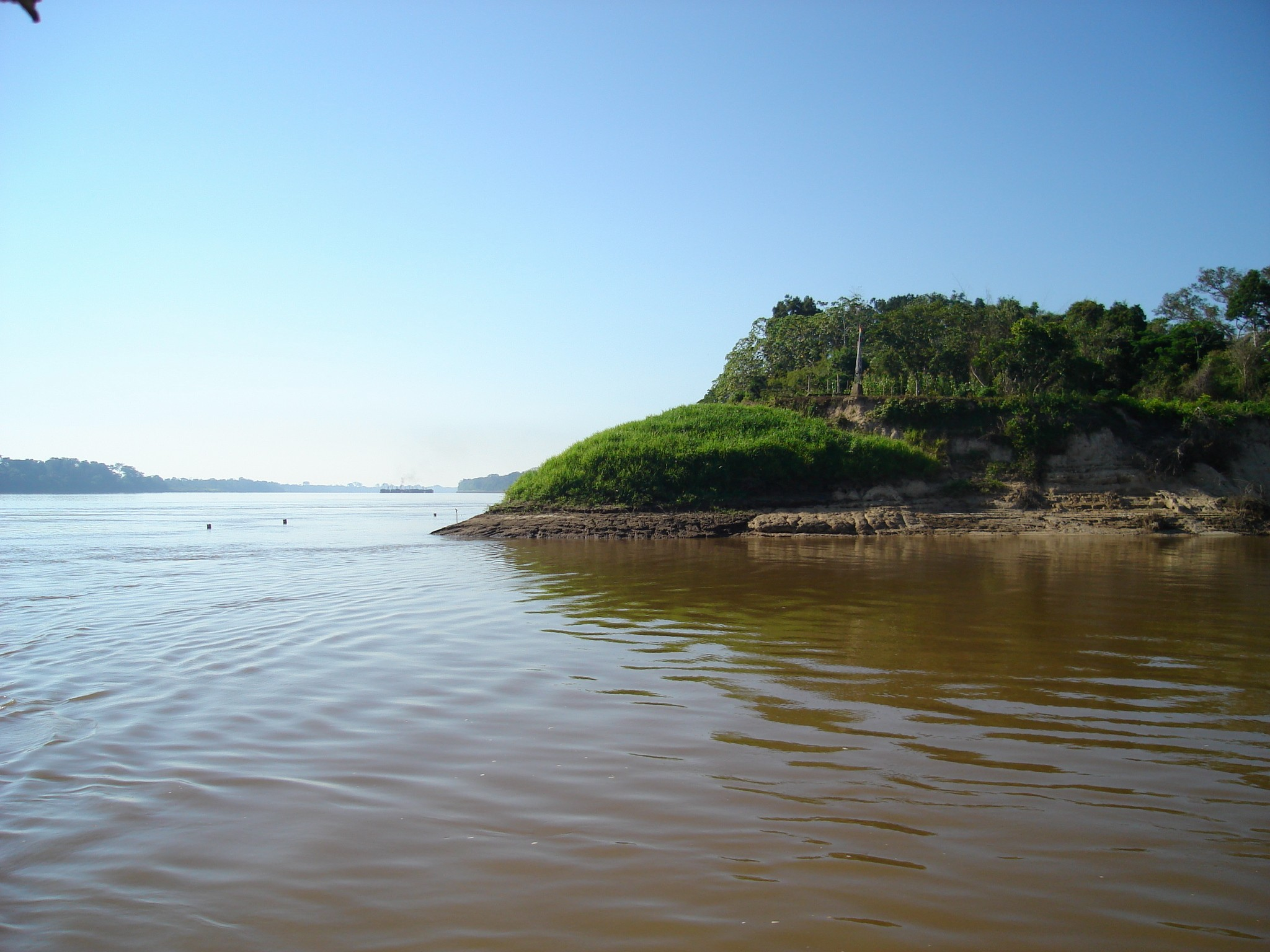
- On the right is the Abuna River, on the left is the Madeira River

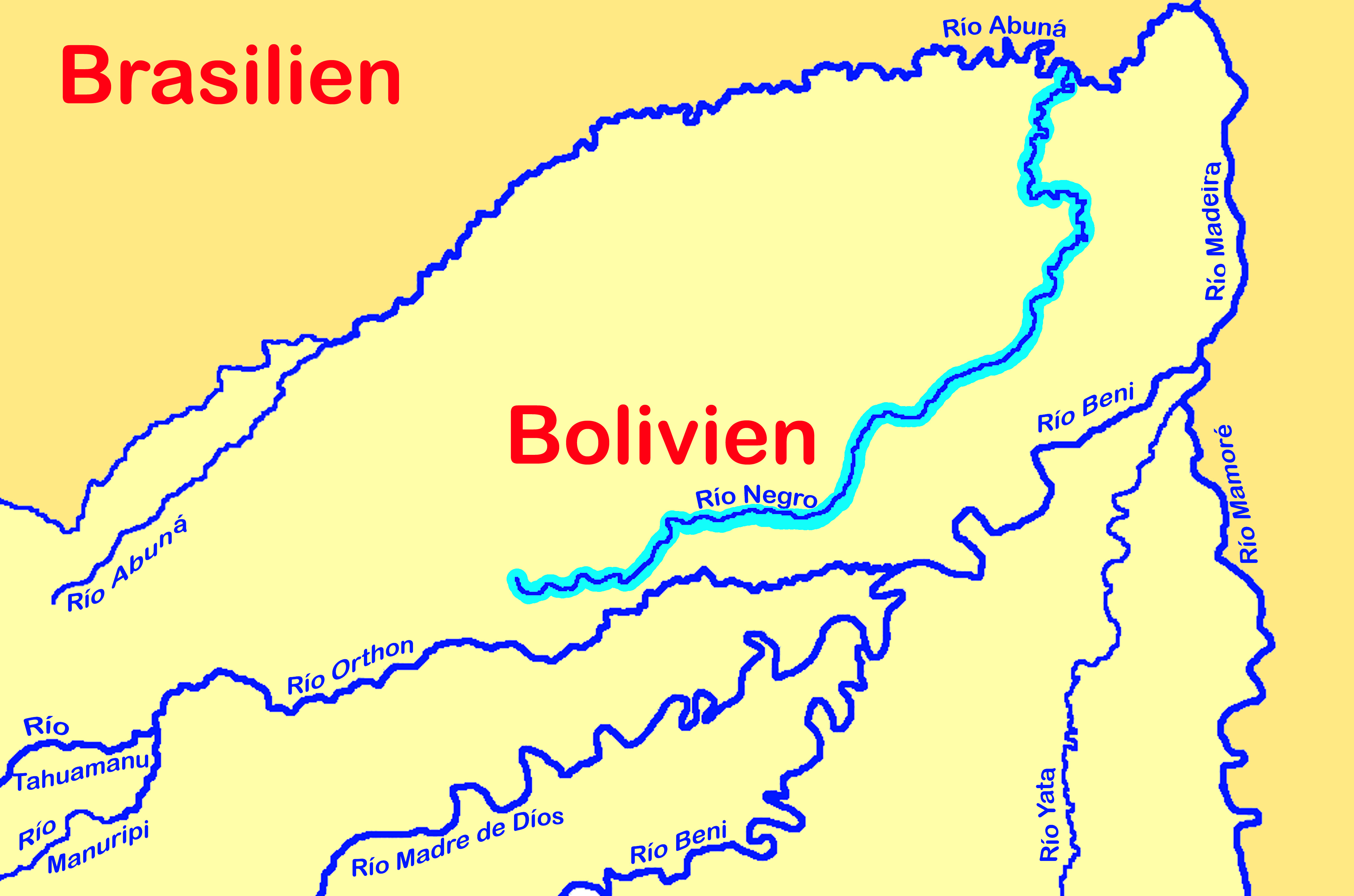

- Mouth in Bolivia

Location
- Country: Bolivia, Brazil
- Region: Pando Department

Physical characteristics
- Mouth: Madeira River
  - coordinates: 9°40′18″S 65°26′47″W
- Length: 500 km (310 mi)

The Abuna River (Spanish: Río Abuná, Portuguese: Rio Abunã) is a river in South America. As a part of the Amazon Basin, it forms part of the border between northern Bolivia and north-western Brazil.

The river has a total length of 375 kilometres (233 mi). It originates in several streams east of the Cordillera Oriental of the Peruvian Andes. The river is navigable for approximately 320 kilometres (200 mi) in its lower northeastern part. At Manoa it joins the Río Madeira, a tributary of the Amazon. Opposite the river mouth is the town of Abunã on the Brazilian side of the confluence.
