= Tahuamanu River =

Coordinates: 11.1042°S 67.5592°W

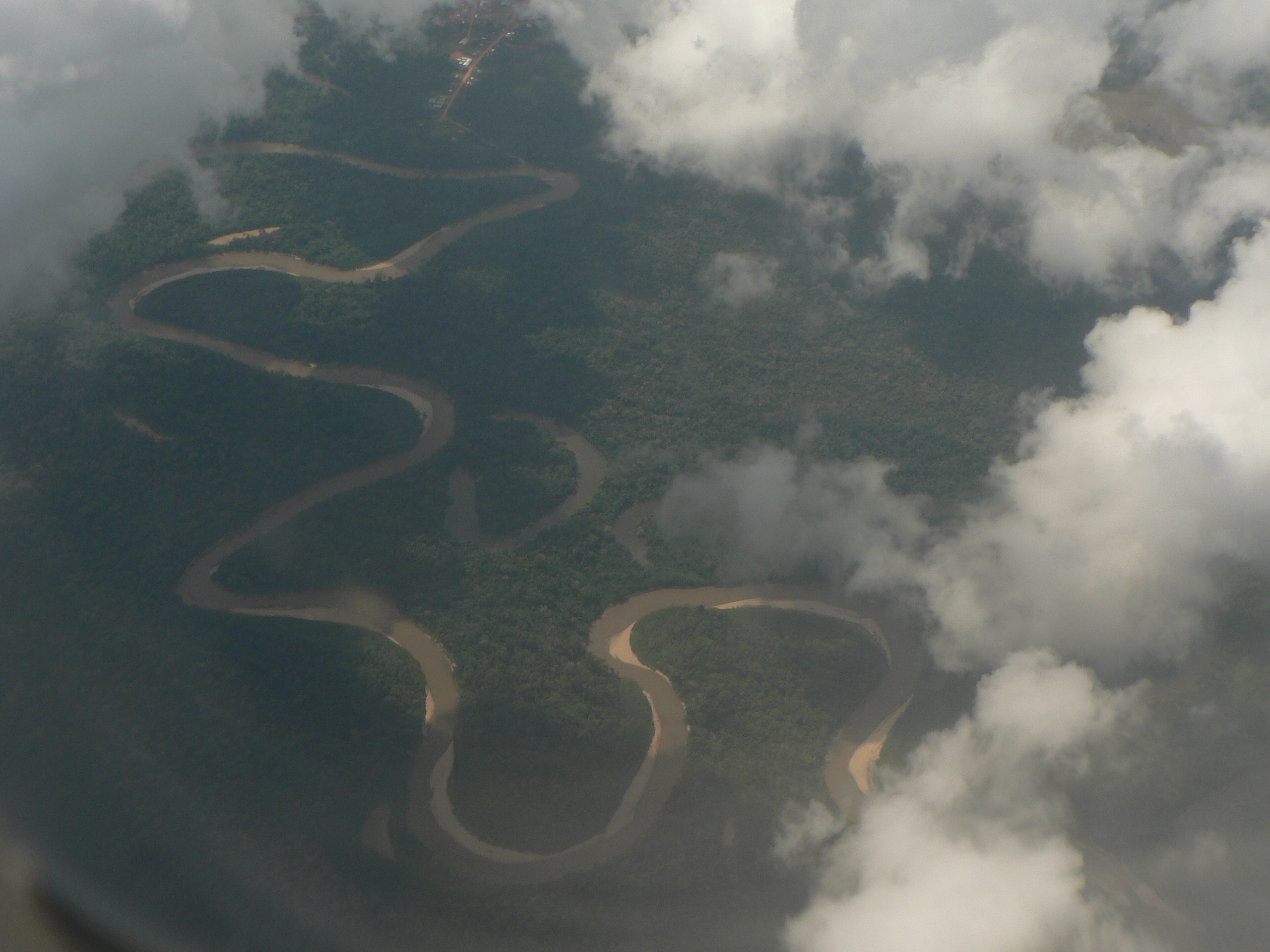
- Tahuamanu River as seen from above

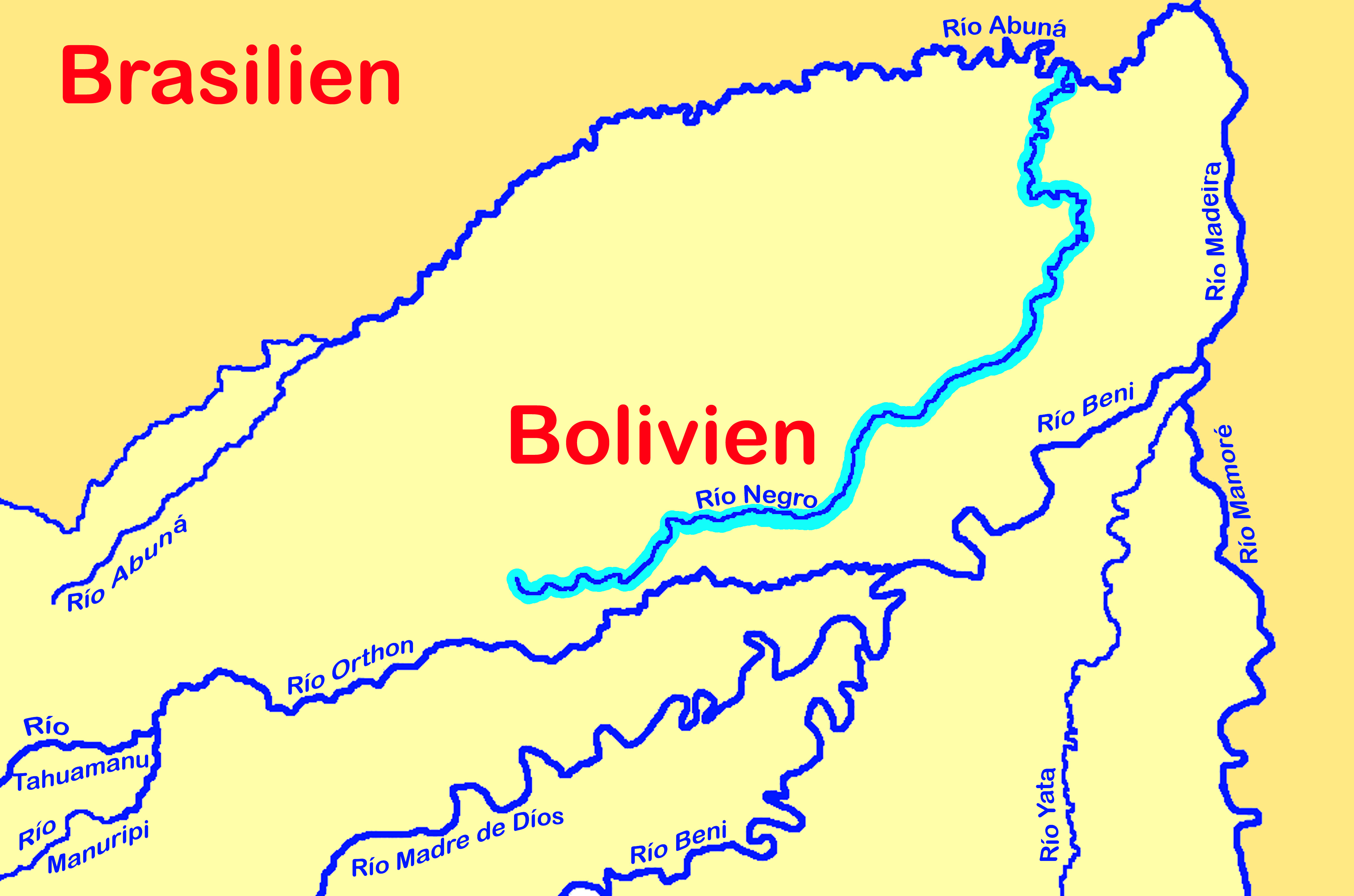

Location
- Country: Bolivia, Peru
- Region: Pando Department; Madre de Dios Region

Physical characteristics
- Mouth: Madre de Dios River

Basin features
- River system: Amazon River

The Tahuamanu River is a river of Bolivia and Peru. Nícolas Suárez Callau enslaved and exploited natives along the Tahuamanu during the rubber boom.

== See also ==
- List of rivers of Bolivia
