= Chayanta River =

Location
- Country: Bolivia
- Region: Potosí Department

Physical characteristics
- Mouth: San Pedro River
  - coordinates: 18°21′14″S 65°41′37″W

The Chayanta River is a river in the Potosí Department of Bolivia.

== See also ==
- List of rivers of Bolivia
