= Pacahuaras River =

Coordinates: 10°25′S 66°13′W

Pacahuaras is a river in Bolivia.
