= Orthon River =

Coordinates: 11°06′17″S 67°33′32″W

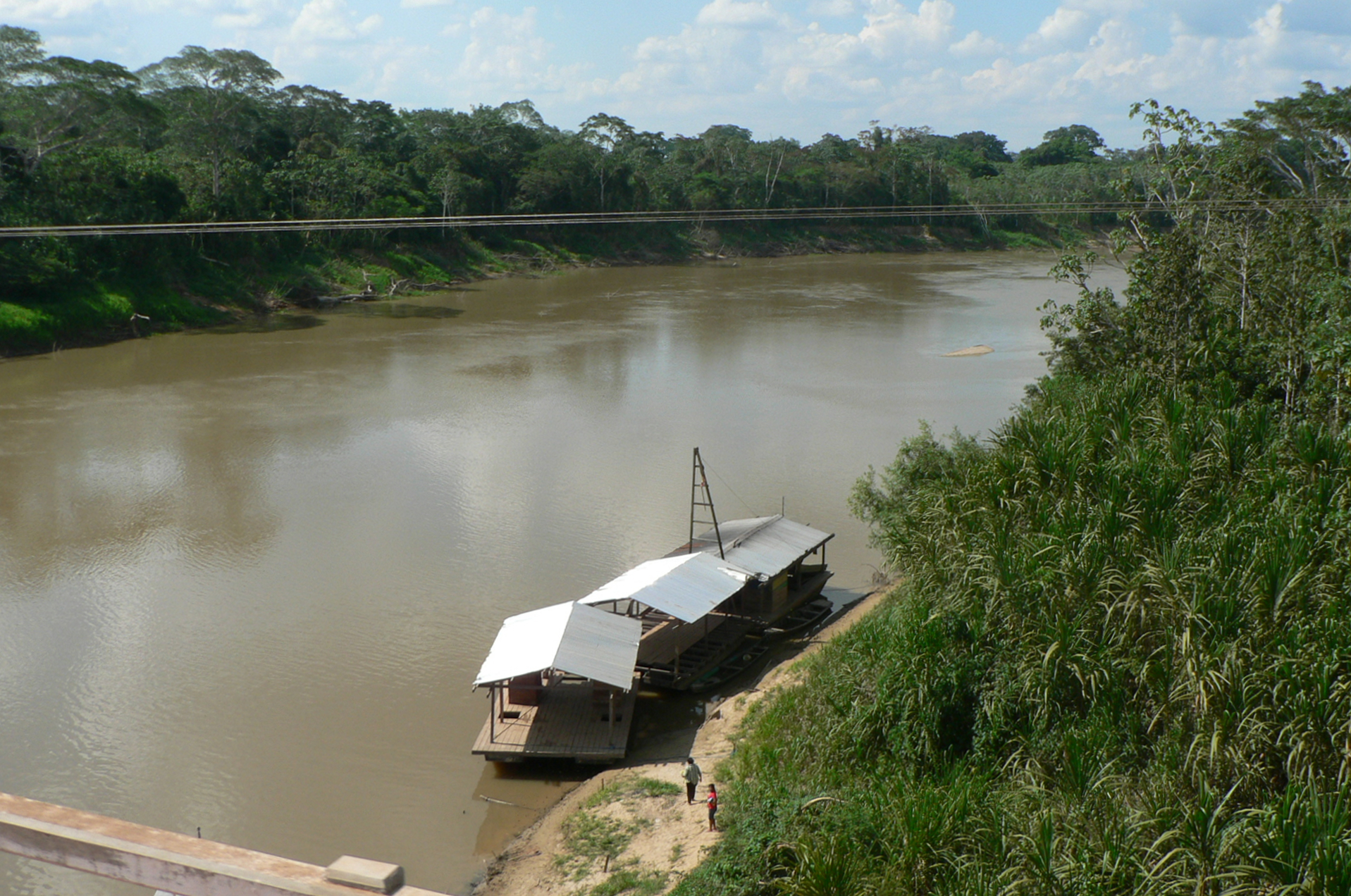
- The Orthon River in Puerto Rico, Bolivia

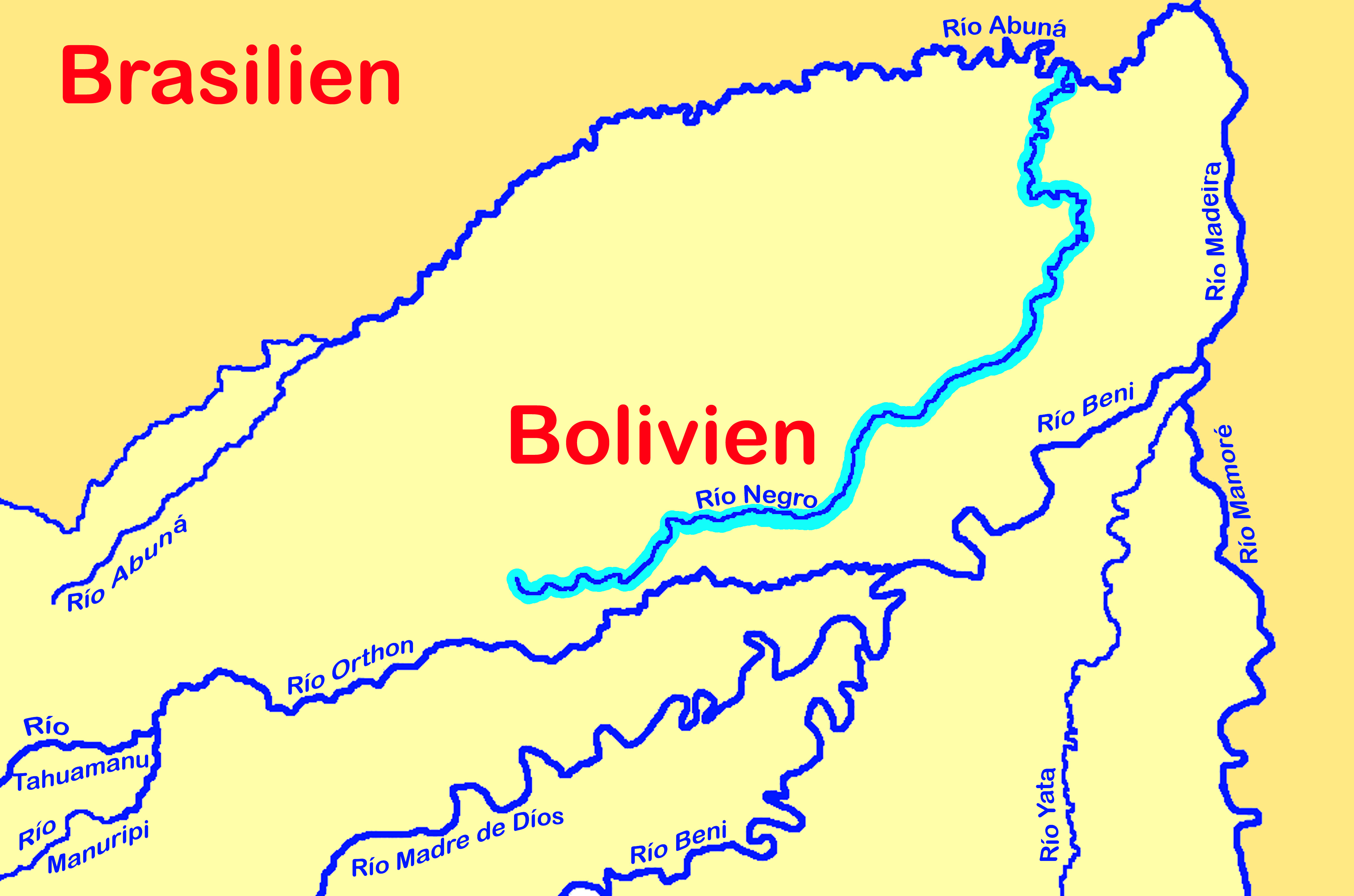

Location
- Country: Bolivia
- Region: Pando Department

Basin features
- River system: Beni River
- Tributaries
  - right: Muymanu River

The Orthon River is a river in the Pando Department of Bolivia and a tributary of river Beni. The river is named after explorer James Orton, who travelled the tributary around the 1870s. A territorial claim for Antonio de Vaca Diez was carved into a tree during a later expedition by Edwin Heath. Vaca Díez was an entrepreneur in the rubber industry who would later dominate the trade on the Orthon river. Like other rubber barons, Antonio used the exploited local indigenous population as his workforce. Díez became a business partner of Carlos Fermín Fitzcarrald sometime in the early 1890s. On February 1, 1897 The Orton Rubber Co. Ltd. was registered in London by Vaca Díez. After the death of Antonio and Fitzcarrald in a river accident on the Urubamba in July 1897: rubber baron Nícolas Suárez absorbed the territory into his estate.

== See also ==
- List of rivers of Bolivia
