= Yata River =

River in Bolivia

Coordinates: 10.4861°S 65.4333°W

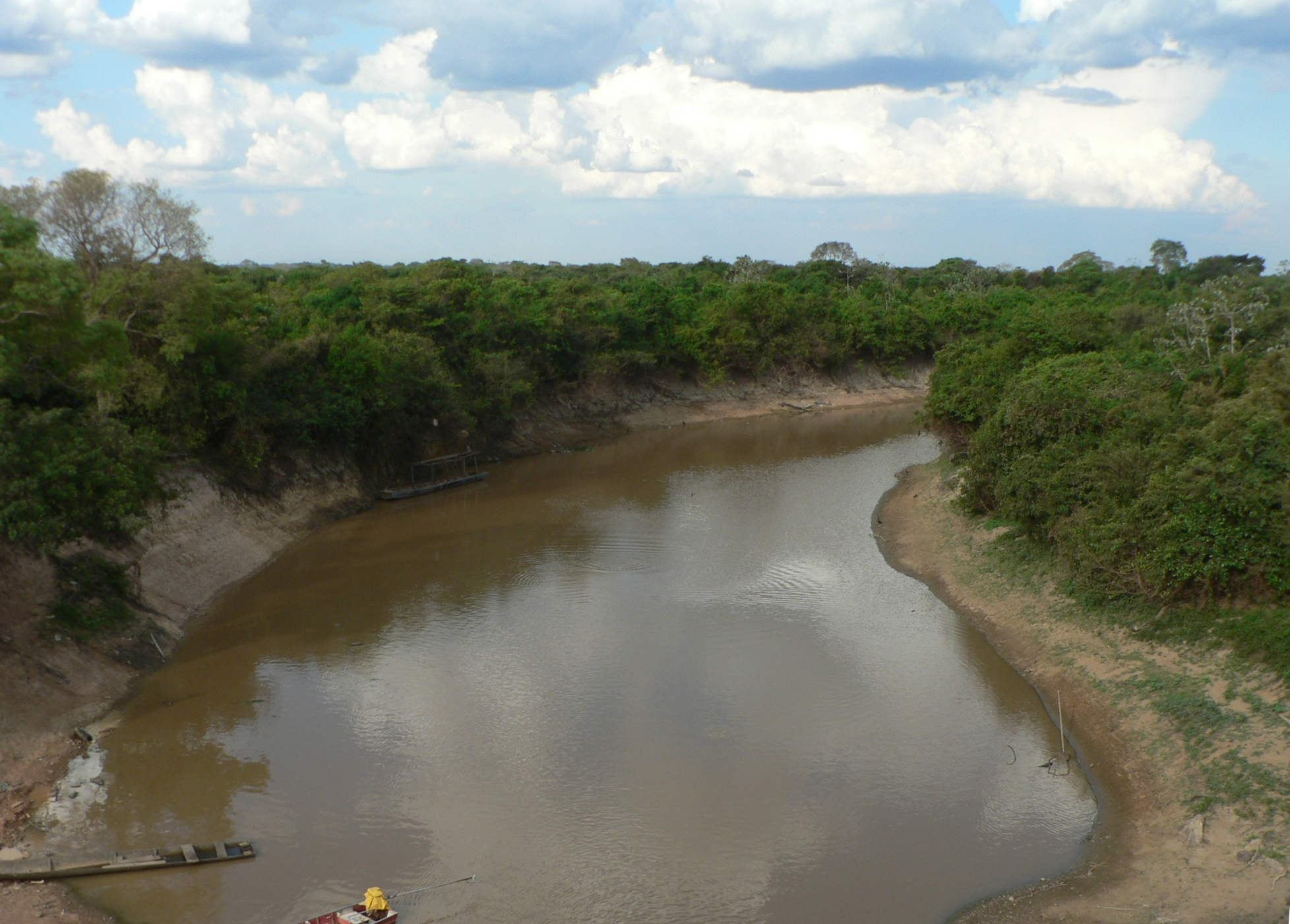

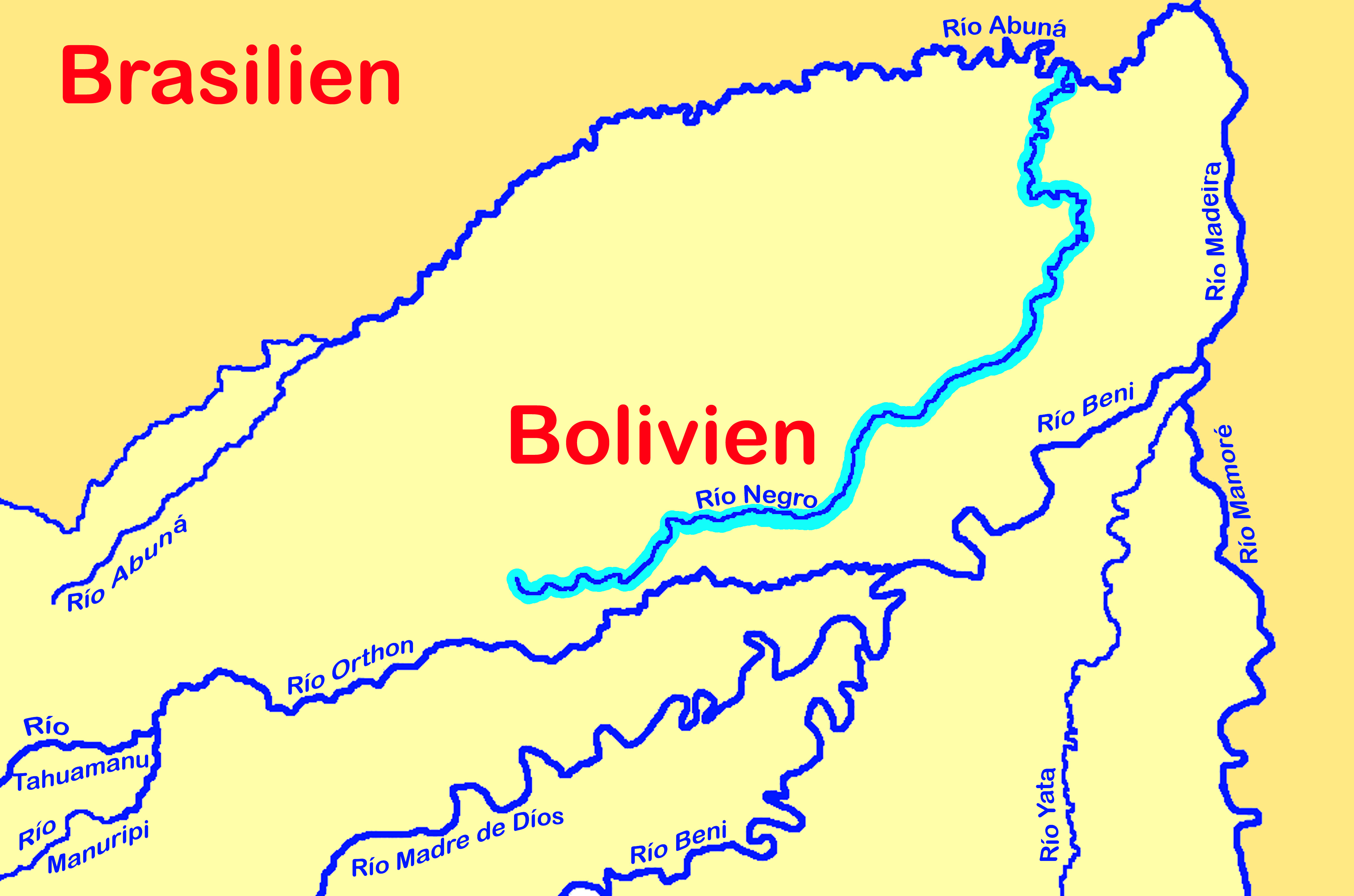

Location
- Country: Bolivia
- Region: Beni Department

Physical characteristics
- Mouth: Mamoré River
- Length: 470 km (290 mi)

Ramsar Wetland
- Official name: Río Yata
- Designated: 2 February 2013
- Reference no.: 2094

The Yata River is a river of Bolivia. Parts of the river have been observed to contain flesh eating piranhas.

== See also ==
- List of rivers of Bolivia
