= Lloyd Aéreo Boliviano =

Principal airline of Bolivia

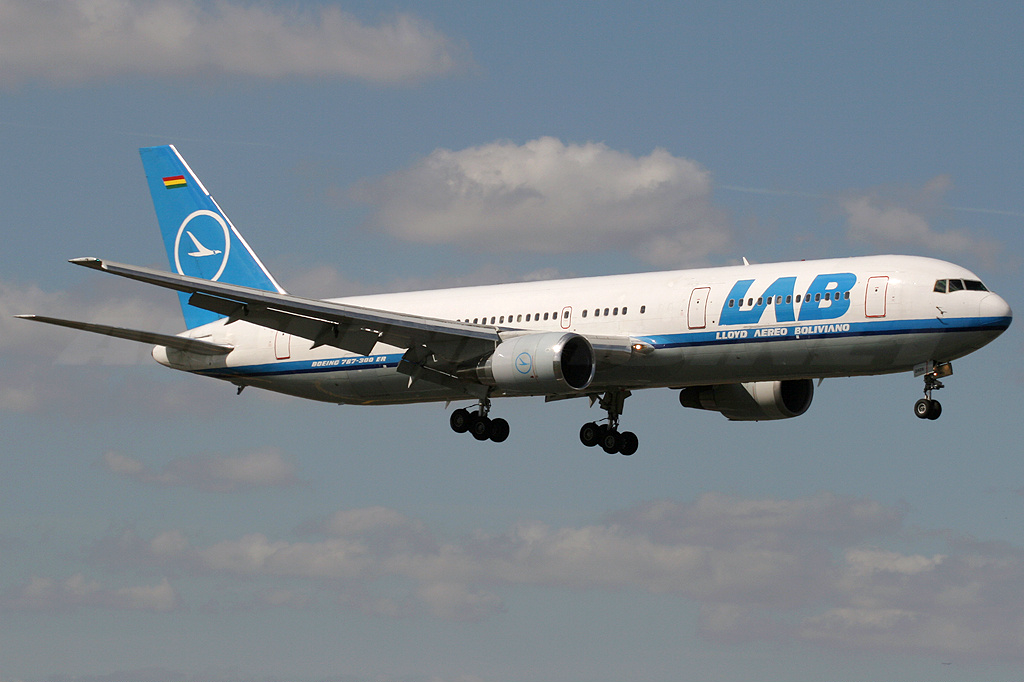
- A Boeing 767-300ER landing at Miami International Airport.
IATA	ICAO	Call sign
LB	LLB	BOLIVIANO
- Founded: September 15, 1925; 100 years ago (Note: There exists a discrepancy over the foundation date of the airline as it was also informed it occurred on 14 September 1925.)
- Commenced operations: 23 September 1925
- Ceased operations: 2008 (operations suspended); 2010 (license revoked)
- Hubs: Cochabamba
- Secondary hubs: Santa Cruz-Viru Viru; La Paz-El Alto
- Parent company: VASP (1995-2001)
- Headquarters: Cochabamba, Bolivia
- Key people: Marcelo Goldmann (CEO)
- Website: labairlines.com.bo

Lloyd Aéreo Boliviano (LAB), internationally known as LAB Bolivian Airlines, was the flag carrier and principal airline of Bolivia for much of the 20th century. It was founded on 15 September 1925 by a consortium of German-Bolivian residents and began commercial flights on 24 September between Cochabamba and Santa Cruz using a Junkers F 13.

The airline was the second oldest in South America after Avianca, and among the oldest airlines in the world. It operated scheduled domestic and international services to destinations in the Americas together with a transatlantic route to Madrid in Spain. It was headquartered in Cochabamba, having its main domestic hub at the city's Jorge Wilstermann International Airport, and international hubs at Viru Viru International Airport in Santa Cruz and El Alto International Airport in La Paz.

== History ==
=== Origins ===
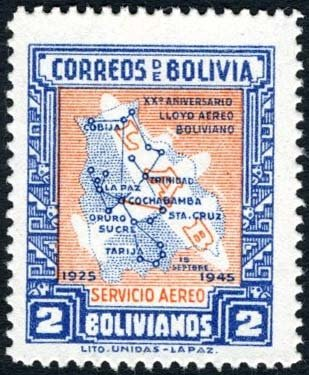
A postage stamp from 1945 featuring a map of Bolivia and LAB's domestic flights.

Lloyd Aéreo Boliviano (LAB) was founded by German immigrants in August 1925. On 24 September 1925, the airline launched its services between Cochabamba and Santa Cruz using a single Junkers F13 aircraft.

In July 1930, Lloyd Aéreo began to serve international routes, with scheduled flights between La Paz, where it was based then, and Corumbá, Brazil. On the grounds of a co-operation agreement with Syndicato Condor, an airline catering for the German minority in Brazil, LAB passengers could connect in Corumbá on a flight to Rio de Janeiro, and vice versa. Over the following years, more destinations in Brazil were added, so that Lloyd Aéreo became the second largest airline in South America at that time, only surpassed by Avianca from Colombia. In 1932, the Bolivian government seized all of LAB's planes and staff, so that they could be dispatched for military use during the Chaco War with Paraguay.

=== Bolivian national airline ===
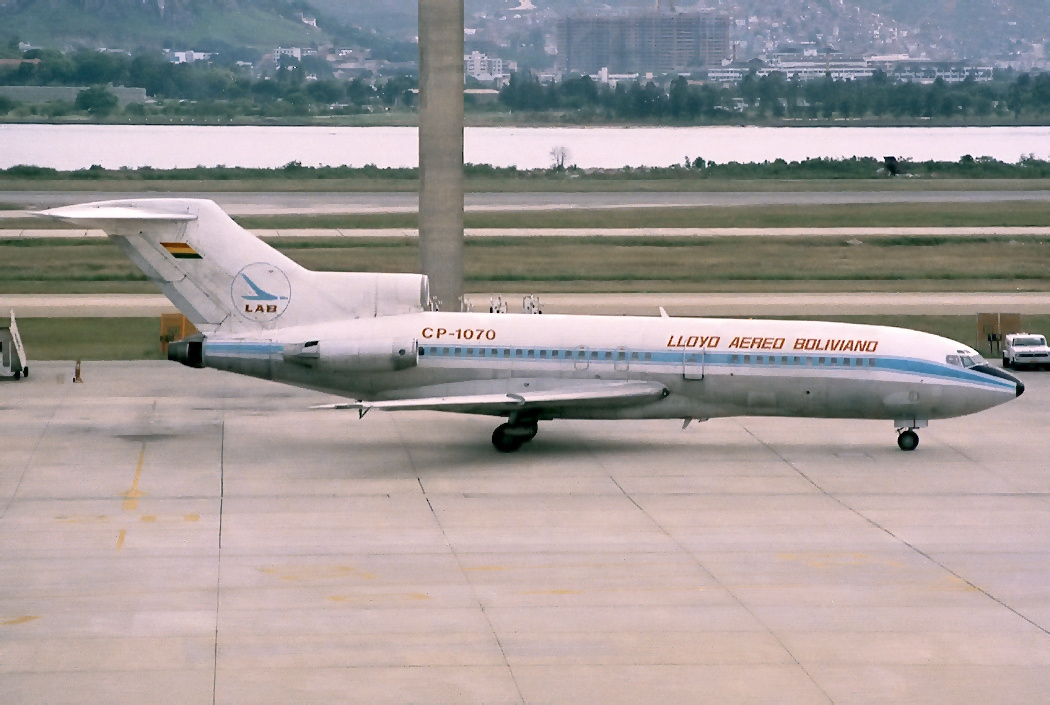
A Boeing 727-100 at Rio de Janeiro/Galeão International Airport in 1984.

In May 1941, LAB was taken over by the government of Bolivia as the country's national airline and Panagra was granted a contract to administer it. In March 1960, Panagra held a 20% interest in LAB and the government of Bolivia was the major shareholder. At this time, Edmundo Gonzalez was the president of the airline and the fleet consisted of seven DC-3s, one DC-4 and six Boeing B-17s. With the Lockheed L-188 Electra joining the fleet in September 1968, LAB was in the position to offer non-stop international flights. A further improvement in comfort and travel times was achieved when Lloyd Aéreo acquired its first jet aircraft (of the Boeing 727 type) in 1970, allowing for the inauguration of flights to Central America and the United States.

At March 1990, the airline had 1,700 employees and was 99.98% owned by the government. By this time the network, which consisted of 21 domestic destinations and 15 international ones (Arica, Asunción, Belo Horizonte, Buenos Aires, Caracas, Cuzco, Lima, Manaus, Miami, Montevideo, Panama, Rio de Janeiro, Salta, Santiago and São Paulo), was served with two Boeing 707-320C, three Boeing 727-200s, two Boeing 727-100s, one Fokker F27-600 and one Fokker F27-200.

=== Financial difficulties and demise ===
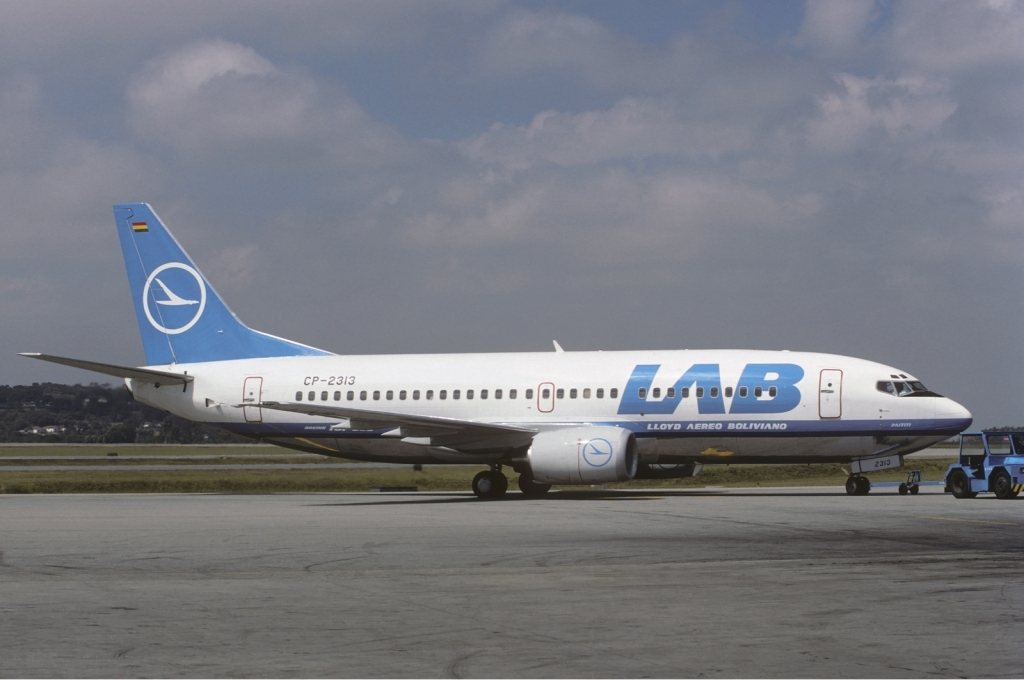
A Boeing 737-300 featuring a livery borrowed from its main stakeholder, VASP.

From 1994 onwards, Lloyd Aéreo Boliviano was encountering rising financial difficulties. As a consequence, the Bolivian government prepared the privatization of the airline and began to negotiate with potential buyers. On 19 October 1995, Brazilian airline VASP acquired 50 percent of the LAB shares. In an effort to cut costs, VASP aimed at a full merger of the two airlines, with a similar livery and a joint frequent flyer program as initial steps. At July 1998, 49% and 48.3% of the shares were held by VASP and the Bolivian government, respectively. In 2001, VASP sold its shares in LAB back to Bolivian investors, though, due to the ongoing monetary constraints. On the other hand, in 2004, LAB was awarded shares in Ecuatoriana de Aviación, the national airline of Ecuador at that time, as a compensation for outstanding debts, which led to a codeshare agreement between the two airlines.

From 2006, Lloyd Aéreo had to cut flights because it was in bad financial shape; leased long-haul aircraft (a random mix of Airbus A310, Boeing 757, Boeing 767 or Lockheed L-1011 TriStar at that time) could not be paid for anymore. On 30 March 2007, it was decided by the Bolivian government to shut down Lloyd Aéreo Boliviano, which meant that effective on 1 April, all flight operations were suspended. In October of the same year, Boliviana de Aviación was established as new national airline of Bolivia. LAB operated a limited number of charter flights during late 2007 and early 2008, on behalf of AeroSur, but has since fully gone out of business, with its airline license officially been revoked in 2010.

== Destinations ==
=== During the 1930s ===
At that time, Lloyd Aéreo Boliviano offered mostly domestic flights, each of which with several stopovers (which was normal at a time where the range of airlines was very limited compared to today's situation). The route network had two hubs: In Cochabamba, the headquarters of the airline, and in Santa Cruz de la Sierra. Scheduled services were offered to the following destinations:

Bolivia

- Cachuela Esperanza
- Camiri
- Charagua
- Cobija
- Cochabamba (hub)
- Guajará-Mirim
- Lagunillas
- La Paz
- Magdalena
- Oruro
- Potosí
- Puerto Suárez
- Riberalta
- Roboré
- San José de Chiquitos
- Santa Ana del Yacuma
- Santa Cruz de la Sierra (hub)
- Sucre
- Tarija
- Todos Santos
- Trinidad
- Vallegrande
- Villamontes
- Yacuíba

Brazil

- Corumbá

In Corumba, passengers could connect on Syndicato Condor flights to destinations within Brazil and even to Europe. Similarly, in La Paz, connecting flights to the Peruvian towns of Arequipa and Lima were offered in co-operation with Deutsche Lufthansa Peru. Like LAB, these airlines were aiming at the German minorities in the respective countries.

=== During the 1960s ===
By then, Santa Cruz had replaced Cochabamba as the largest hub for Lloyd Aéreo Boliviano (now flag carrier of Bolivia), with another one having been opened at Trinidad Airport, and international routes being offered from La Paz Airport. The domestic network had grown to extensive size, covering most airports in the country (still relying on multiple-stopover flights). More international routes had been added, with LAB now also offering flights to Chile, Argentina and Peru. The following destinations were served on a scheduled basis in 1964, using Douglas DC-3, DC-6 or Boeing B-17G (the latter being military cargo aircraft converted from a bomber, which could also accommodate passengers).

Bolivia

- Apolo
- Ascención de Guarayos
- Bermejo Airport
- Camiri
- Cobija
- Cochabamba (hub)
- Concepcíon
- Copacabana, Bolivia
- Guayaramerín
- La Paz (international focus city)
- Magdalena
- Puerto Rico
- Puerto Suárez
- Reyes
- Riberalta
- Roboré
- Rurrenabaque
- San Borja
- San Ignacio de Moxos
- San Ignacio de Velasco
- San Javier
- San Joaquín
- San José de Chiquitos
- San Ramón
- Santa Ana del Yacuma
- Santa Cruz de la Sierra (main hub)
- Sucre
- Tarija
- Todos Santos
- Trinidad (hub)
- Villamontes
- Yacuíba, Tarija

Argentina

- Buenos Aires
- Salta

Brazil

- Corumbá
- São Paulo

Chile

- Arica

Peru

- Lima

=== During the 1970s ===
During the 1970s, LAB's President Mario Patino Ayoroa developed the company's routes and made it an international player. The international network saw further expansion, most notably with the launch of scheduled flights to the United States.

Argentina

- Buenos Aires – Ezeiza Airport
- Salta – El Ayball Airport

Bolivia

- Cochabamba – Jorge Wilstermann International Airport (focus city)
- La Paz – El Alto International Airport (focus city)
- Santa Cruz de la Sierra – El Trompillo Airport (main hub)
- Trinidad – Trinidad Airport

Brazil

- Rio de Janeiro – Galeão Airport
- São Paulo – Congonhas Airport

Chile

- Antofagasta – Antofagasta Airport
- Arica – Chacalluta Airport
- Santiago – Pudahuel Airport

Panama

- Panama City – Tocumen International Airport

Paraguay

- Asunción – Presidente Stroessner International Airport

Peru

- Lima – Jorge Chávez International Airport

United States

- Miami – Miami International Airport

=== During the 1980s ===
At that time, the LAB network had been consolidated, appearing more or less in the shape it would retain until the 2000s. The largest Bolivian cities were linked with destinations all over South America, as well as in the United States (international flights usually had several stopovers). International flights as well as hub-to-hub flights were operated using Boeing 727 aircraft, whilst the Fokker F-27 and the similar Fairchild F-27 were deployed on the domestic network. From 1990, Lloyd Aéreo Boliviano moved its main hub in Santa Cruz de la Sierra from El Trompillo Airport to Viru Viru International Airport.

Bolivia

- Bermejo – Bermejo Airport
- Camiri – Camiri Airport
- Cobija – Captain Aníbal Arab Airport
- Cochabamba – Jorge Wilstermann International Airport (focus city)
- Guayaramerín – Guayaramerín Airport
- La Paz – El Alto International Airport (hub)
- Magdalena – Magdalena Airport
- Puerto Suárez – Puerto Suárez International Airport
- Reyes – Reyes Airport
- Riberalta – Riberalta Airport
- Rurrenabaque – Rurrenabaque Airport
- San Borja – Capitán Germán Quiroga Guardia Airport
- San Ignacio de Velasco – San Ignacio Airport
- San Joaquín – San Joaquín Airport
- Santa Ana del Yacuma – Santa Ana del Yacuma Airport
- Santa Cruz de la Sierra – El Trompillo Airport (hub)
  (from 1990 replaced by Viru Viru International Airport)
- Sucre – Juana Azurduy de Padilla International Airport
- Tarija – Capitán Oriel Lea Plaza Airport
- Trinidad – Trinidad Airport
- Villamontes – Lieutenant Colonel Rafael Pabón Airport
- Yacuíba – Yacuiba Airport

Argentina

- Buenos Aires – Ezeiza Airport
- Salta – El Ayball Airport

Brazil

- Belo Horizonte – Pampulha Airport
  (Tancredo Neves International Airport from 1990)
- Manaus – Eduardo Gomes International Airport
- Rio de Janeiro – Galeão Airport
- São Paulo – Congonhas Airport

Chile

- Arica – Chacalluta Airport
- Iquique
- Santiago de Chile – Pudahuel Airport

Panama

- Panama City – Tocumen International Airport

Paraguay

- Asunción – Presidente Stroessner International Airport

Peru

- Cusco – Alejandro Velasco Astete International Airport
- Lima – Jorge Chávez International Airport

United States

- Miami – Miami International Airport

Uruguay

- Montevideo – Carrasco International Airport

Venezuela

- Caracas – Simón Bolívar Airport

=== Prior to closure ===
During the 2000s, LAB offered scheduled flights to the following destinations:

Argentina

- Buenos Aires – Ministro Pistarini International Airport
- Córdoba – Ingeniero Ambrosio L.V. Taravella International Airport
- Salta – Martín Miguel de Güemes International Airport
- San Miguel de Tucumán – Benjamín Matienzo International Airport

Bolivia

- Cochabamba – Jorge Wilstermann International Airport (hub)
- La Paz – El Alto International Airport (focus city)
- Santa Cruz de la Sierra – Viru Viru International Airport (hub)
- Sucre – Juana Azurduy de Padilla International Airport
- Tarija – Capitán Oriel Lea Plaza Airport
- Trinidad – Teniente Jorge Henrich Arauz Airport

Brazil

- Manaus – Eduardo Gomes International Airport
- São Paulo – Guarulhos Airport
- Rio de Janeiro – Galeão International Airport

Chile

- Santiago – Arturo Merino Benítez International Airport
- Arica – Chacalluta International Airport

Colombia

- Bogotá – El Dorado International Airport

Cuba

- Havana – José Martí International Airport

Ecuador

- Guayaquil – Jose Joaquin de Olmedo International Airport
- Quito – Mariscal Sucre International Airport

Mexico

- Cancún – Cancún International Airport
- Mexico City – Mexico City International Airport

Panama

- Panama City – Tocumen International Airport

Paraguay

- Asunción – Silvio Pettirossi International Airport

Peru

- Cusco – Alejandro Velasco Astete International Airport
- Lima – Jorge Chávez International Airport

Spain

- Madrid – Madrid-Barajas Airport

United States

- Miami – Miami International Airport
- Washington, D.C. – Washington Dulles International Airport

Uruguay

- Montevideo – Carrasco International Airport

Venezuela

- Caracas – Simón Bolívar International Airport

== Fleet ==
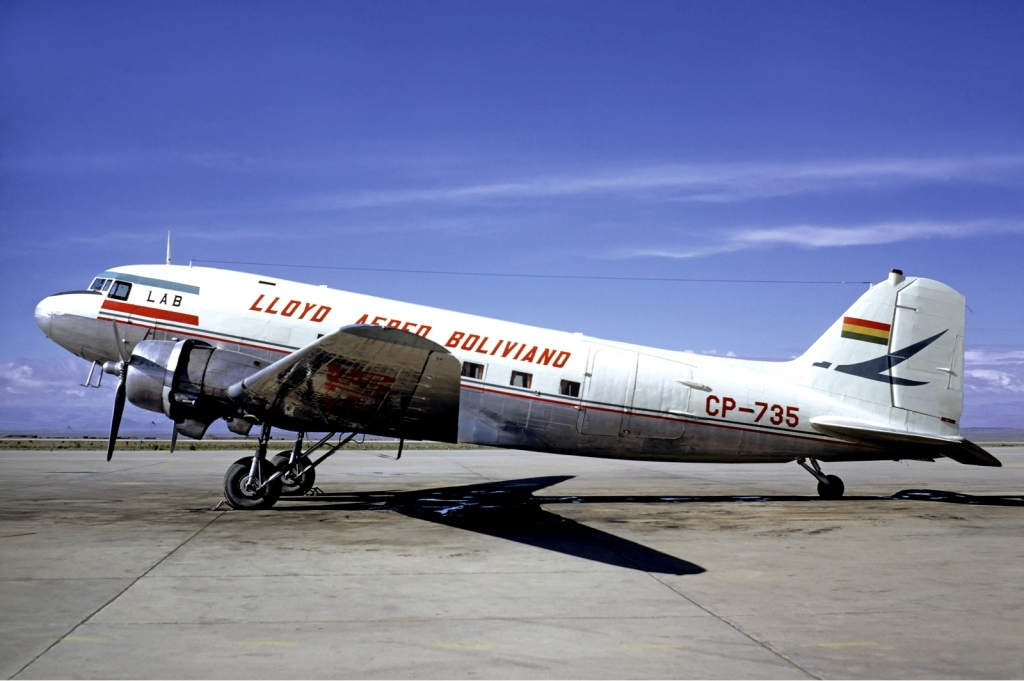
Douglas DC-3. (1962)

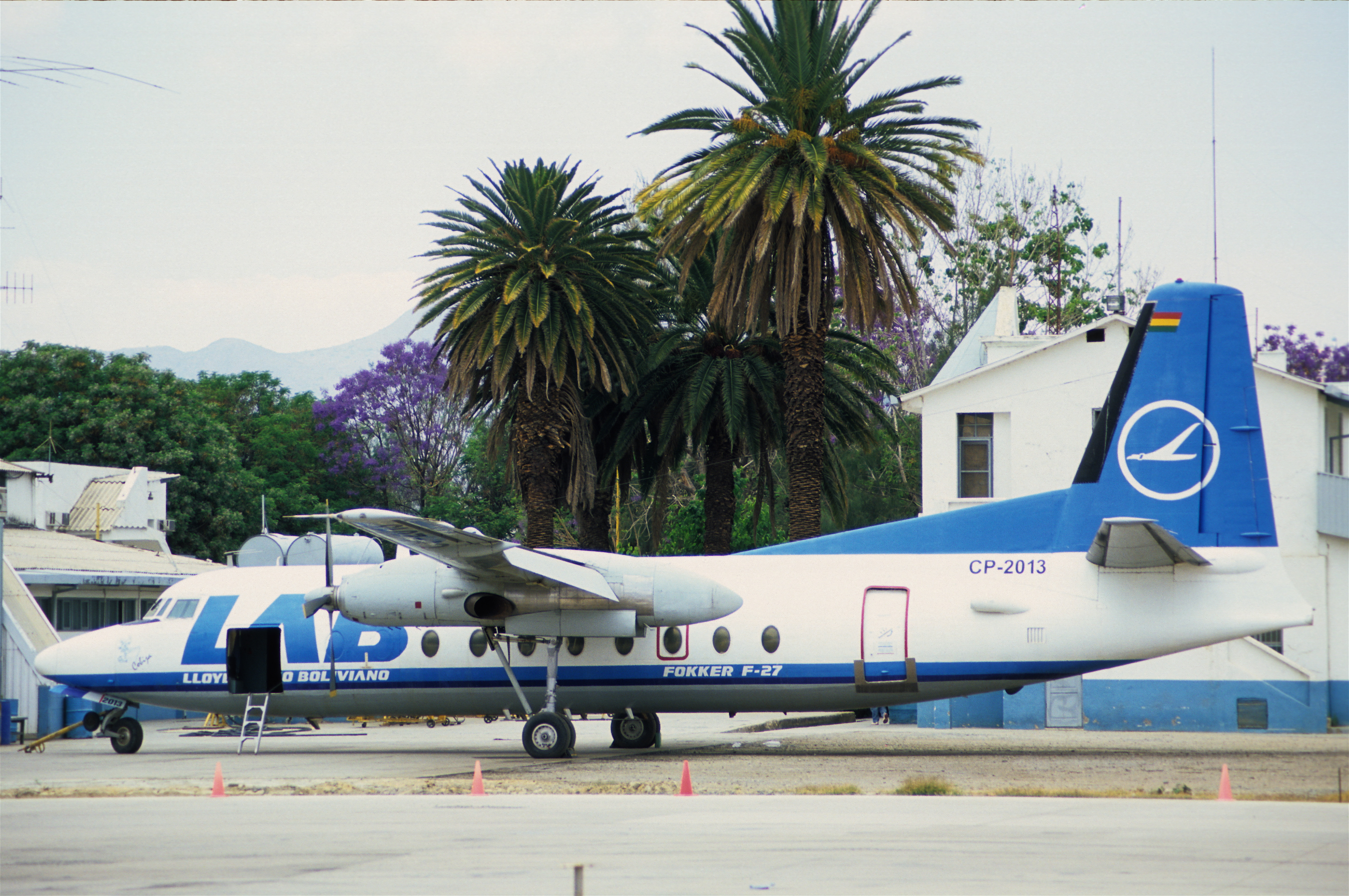
Fokker F-27. (2004)

Boeing 727-200 at Jorge Wilstermann International Airport. (2004)

Over the years of its existence, Lloyd Aéreo Boliviano operated the following aircraft types:

Aircraft	Introduced	Retired
Airbus A300	1990	1991
Airbus A310	1991	2004
Boeing B-17G	1950	1970
Boeing 707	1977	2000
Boeing 727-100 & 727-200	1970	2008
Boeing 737-300	1996	2008
Boeing 757-200	2004	2006
Boeing 767-200	1989	1990
Boeing 767-300ER	2002	2006
Consolidated C-87 Liberator Express	1951	
Curtiss-Wright C-46 Commando	1949	
Douglas C-47 Skytrain	1945	
Douglas DC-3	1945	
Douglas DC-4	1955	1961
Douglas DC-6	1960	1973
Fairchild F-27	1969	
Fokker F27 Friendship	1987	2004
Fokker F28 Fellowship		
Junkers F.13	1925	1933
Junkers Ju 52	1932	1944
Lockheed Model 18 Lodestar	1941	
Lockheed L-188 Electra	1968	1973
Lockheed L-1011 TriStar	2006	2006

== Accidents and incidents ==
- On 21 August 1944, an LAB Lockheed Model 18 Lodestar (registered CB-25) was destroyed in a fire at La Paz Airport.
- On 29 May 1947, an LAB Douglas C-47 Skytrain (registered CB-32) crashed near Trinidad.
- On 10 August 1949, an LAB Curtiss-Wright C-46 Commando (registered CB-37) crashed near Rurrenabaque. In September of the same year, a Lodestar (registered CB-26) was damaged beyond repair in a shooting during the Bolivian National Revolution.
- In 1950, two LAB C-46s crashed: CB-51 near Cochabamba on 24 April, and its sister aircraft CB-38 on 2 October near La Laguna Lake.
- On 1 January 1951, an LAB C-47 (registered CB-31) was damaged beyond repair in a crash-landing at La Paz Airport.
- On 3 November 1953, a Lloyd Aéreo Boliviano Douglas DC-3 (registered CP-600) crashed into a mountain near Potosí, killing the 25 passengers and 3 crew members on board. The aircraft had been on a scheduled domestic flight from Camiri to Sucre.
- On 5 September 1955, two LAB aircraft collided mid-air over Cochabamba: A DC-3 (registered CP-572) on a scheduled passenger flight, and a Boeing B-17G (CP-597) on a cargo flight. The Boeing crashed, killing all three crew members. The DC-3 managed to perform an emergency landing.
- On 25 August 1956, a cargo-configured Lloyd Aéreo DC-3 (registered CP-506) crash-landed at La Paz Airport, killing two out of the three people on board.
- On 26 September 1956, the first hijacking of a commercial flight with political purposes was of the Lloyd Aereo Boliviano on 26 September 1956. The airplane (DC-4), carried 47 prisoners. They were being transported from Santa Cruz, Bolivia to the town of El Alto, in La Paz. There, a political group was waiting to take them to a concentration camp located in Carahuara de Carangas, Oruro. The 47 prisoners gained control of the aircraft in mid-flight and rerouted the airplane to Tartagal, Argentina. Two of the 47 prisoners took control of the aircraft controls and received instructions to again reroute to Salta, Argentina as the airfield in Tartagal was not big enough for the DC-4. They did and moments later arrived safely to the city of Salta. They told the government of the injustice they were submitted to, and received political asylum.
- On 18 March 1957, another DC-3 (registered CP-535), which had been on a passenger flight from Cochabamba to Oruro, crashed into a mountain near Sayari. All 16 passengers and 3 crew members died.
- On 31 December 1959, all 11 occupants of an LAB C-47 (registered CP-584) died when the aircraft crashed shortly after take-off from an airfield near San José de Chiquitos.
- On 5 February 1960, a Lloyd Aéreo Boliviano Douglas DC-4 (registered CP-604), that had been on a scheduled passenger flight from Cochabamba to La Paz, crashed shortly after take-off into Laguna Huañacota, a mountain lake, following an engine fire. All 55 passengers and 4 crew members lost their lives (a two-year-old girl could be saved, but later died in hospital).
- On 21 August 1962, an LAB C-47 (registered CP-536) crashed near Cochabamba Airport during a post-maintenance test flight, killing four out of the five people on board.
- On 15 March 1963 at approximately 13:55 local time, Lloyd Aéreo Boliviano Flight 915 from Arica, Chile to La Paz, that was operated by a Douglas DC-6 (registered CP-707) on this day, crashed into Mount Chachakumani, killing all 36 passengers and three crew members. At the time of the accident, there were poor visibility conditions due to bad weather.
- On 4 February 1964, an LAB C-47 aircraft (registered CP-568) crashed shortly after departing Yacuiba Airport, killing two out of the 29 people on board.
- On 3 August 1966, an LAB C-46 (registered CP-730) that had been on a cargo flight from Riberalta to Cochabamba crashed into a mountain range of the Andes, killing all three people on board. The accident likely occurred because of a navigational error of the pilot, who had chosen a wrong flight path and subsequently had flown at the wrong altitude.
- On 19 April 1968, an LAB DC-3 (registered CP-734) crashed shortly after take-off from an airstrip at Trinidad. Even though the aircraft was damaged beyond repair, there were no fatalities.
- On 26 September 1969 at around 15:10 local time, an LAB DC-6 (registered CP-698) carrying 69 passengers and 5 crew members on a scheduled flight from Santa Cruz de la Sierra to La Paz crashed into Mount Choquetanga 176 kilometres away from the destination airport. There were no survivors when the wreckage was found after three days. Seventeen Bolivian football players had been amongst the passengers.
- On 16 December 1971, an LAB passenger flight from Sucre to La Paz was hijacked and demanded to be diverted to Chile. The aircraft landed at Cochabamba Airport instead, police forces stormed the plane and arrested the perpetrator. In the ensuing shooting, one crew member and one passenger were killed.
- On 13 October 1976 at 13:32 local time, a Boeing 707 freighter aircraft (registered N730JP) that had been chartered by LAB to operate a cargo flight from Santa Cruz de la Sierra to Miami crashed directly after take-off from El Trompillo Airport into a housing area and a crowded football pitch, killing the three crew members as well as 88 people on the ground, making it the deadliest air disaster in Bolivia to date. The accident had likely occurred because the pilots had not selected the correct amount of thrust, so that the aircraft did not gain sufficient height.
- On 23 January 1980, a LAB Fairchild F-27J (registered CP-1175) ran off a taxiway whilst being on ground at Santa Ana del Yacuma Airport and went into a ditch, during which the fuel tank was ruptured by debris from the propeller. In the ensuing fire, the aircraft was destroyed, but all 15 passengers and the three crew members could be saved.
- On 2 June 1980, a Lloyd Aéreo Boliviano F-27J (registered CP-1117) crashed into a hill whilst approaching Yacuiba Airport, killing the 10 passengers and three crew members on board.
- On 16 March 1984, another F-27M (registered CP-862) crashed, this time in a jungle somewhere between Trinidad and San Borja, claiming the lives of the 20 passengers and three crew.
- On 23 January 1985, a passenger detonated a bomb in a lavatory on board an LAB flight from La Paz to Santa Cruz de la Sierra, killing him. The aircraft involved, a Boeing 727-200 registered CP-1276, was substantially damaged but could safely be landed. There were no fatalities among the other 119 passengers and seven crew members.
- On 31 August 1991, an LAB Boeing 707 (registered CP-1365) was destroyed in a hangar fire at Dothan Regional Airport in the United States.
- On 22 December 1994, a Lloyd Aéreo Boliviano Fokker F27 Friendship (registered CP-2165) overran the runway at Guayaramerín Airport following a rejected takeoff and crashed into trees. All 36 passengers and four crew members survived the accident. The planned destination of the scheduled domestic flight had been San Joaquín.
- On 9 January 2001 at 17:20 local time, the left main landing gear of an LAB Boeing 727-200 (registered CP-2323) collapsed while taxiing at Buenos Aires Ezeiza Airport prior to a scheduled flight to Santa Cruz de la Sierra. Investigator found that the accident, by which none of the 138 passengers and 8 crew members were injured but left the aircraft damaged beyond repair, happened because of corrosion damage.
- On 7 August 2004, an LAB Boeing 767-300ER (registered CP-2425) experienced a hard landing at Viru Viru International Airport following a scheduled flight from Miami, and was substantially damaged.
- On 1 February 2008 at 10:35 local time, the pilots of Lloyd Aéreo Boliviano Flight 301, a Boeing 727-200 (registered CP-2429) had to execute a forced landing in a jungle clearing near Trinidad due to fuel exhaustion. The aircraft carrying 151 passengers and 8 crew had been on a scheduled flight from La Paz to Cobija, when it had to divert to Trinidad due to bad weather conditions, ultimately failing make the distance with the remaining fuel. There were no fatalities; the aircraft was damaged beyond repair.
