= Navegación Aérea y Aeropuertos Bolivianos =

- Abbreviation: NAABOL
- Formation: July 21, 1967; 58 years ago (As AASANA); November 17, 2021; 4 years ago (As NAABOL)
- Headquarters: El Alto, Bolivia
- Key people: Elmer Pozo Oliva
- Website: naabol.gob.bo

Navegación Aérea y Aeropuertos Bolivianos (NAABOL) is a decentralized public entity of Bolivia, responsible for airport management and the administration of air navigation services in the country. It was created in November 2021 through Supreme Decree No. 4630, replacing the former entity, AASANA, with the aim of modernizing and improving airport and air navigation management in Bolivia.

== History ==
=== Background ===
On June 21, 1967, the Administración de Aeropuertos y Servicios Auxiliares a la Navegación Aérea (AASANA) was founded through Supreme Decree No. 08019, to plan, build, and manage airports along with airspace control services. Congress later granted it legal status through Law 412, providing AASANA with legal personality and administrative and financial autonomy within the State.

AASANA historically managed up to 42 public airports, including major international hubs such as El Alto, Viru Viru and Jorge Wilstermann. It provided services such as air traffic control, radio communications, meteorology, and aeronautical information, financing itself with revenues generated from these operations.

=== Creation of NAABOL ===
On November 30, 2021, AASANA was facing severe administrative and financial problems, accumulating an approximate debt of Bs 1.314 billion and an operating deficit.

To address these issues, on December 1, 2021, Supreme Decree No. 4630 was issued, which dissolved AASANA and created NAABOL (Navegación Aérea y Aeropuertos Bolivianos).

The decree ordered the immediate cessation of AASANA and created a Liquidator under the Ministry of Public Works, with an initial two-year term to assume and settle the liabilities of the former entity. All assets, documents, contracts, and eligible personnel were transferred to NAABOL.

=== Labor issues ===
Union leaders and Senator Silvia Salame argued that the decree violated the General Labor Law, as it modified workers' rights without legislative involvement. Former AASANA employees also stated that political appointments were made in leadership positions without merit-based selection.

In November 2023, Supreme Decree No. 5075 was issued, extending the Liquidator's term until December 1, 2024, allowing NAABOL to continue managing the inherited liabilities.

== Services ==
NAABOL provides the following services:

Air navigation services

- Air traffic control (ATS)
- Aeronautical meteorology services (MET)
- Aeronautical communications services (COM)
- Aeronautical information services (AIS)
- Rescue and firefighting services (SSEI)

Ground services

- Aeronautical facilitation (FAL)
- Airport security (AVSEC)
- Ramp and apron services
- En-route flight protection services
- Telecommunications and radio aids services
- Visual aids and lighting services

== Administration ==
According to the Directorate General of Civil Aeronautics (DGAC), there are 39 registered public aerodromes in Bolivia, all managed by NAABOL, including commercial terminals and secondary runways. Additionally, 129 private aerodromes have been registered, and another 187 are in the registration process.

=== National airports managed by NAABOL ===
- El Alto International Airport (La Paz)
- Viru Viru International Airport (Santa Cruz)
- Jorge Wilstermann International Airport (Cochabamba)
- Alcantarí International Airport (Sucre)
- Teniente Jorge Henrich Arauz Airport (Trinidad)
- Teniente Coronel Rafael Pabón Airport (Tarija)
- Captain Oriel Lea Plaza Airport (Tarija)
- Captain Aníbal Arab Airport (Cobija)
- Captain Vidal Villagomez Toledo Airport (Santa Cruz)
- Uyuni Airport (Oruro)
- Juan Mendoza Airport (Oruro)
- Captain Nicolas Rojas Airport (Potosí)
- Rurrenabaque Airport (Beni)
- Selin Zeitún López Airport (Beni)
- Yacuiba Airport (Tarija)
- Copacabana Airport (La Paz)

=== Secondary aerodromes managed by NAABOL ===
- Apolo Airport (La Paz)
- Ascensión de Guarayos Airport (Santa Cruz)
- Bermejo Airport (Tarija)
- Camiri Airport (Santa Cruz)
- Charaña Airport (La Paz)
- Chimoré Airport (Cochabamba)
- Concepción Airport (Santa Cruz)
- San Javier Airport (Santa Cruz)
- San José de Chiquitos Airport (Santa Cruz)
- San Matías Airport (Santa Cruz)
- Magdalena Airport (Beni)
- Guayaramerín Airport (Beni)
- Airports in Santa Ana del Yacuma, San Ramón, San Ignacio de Moxos, San Borja, Santa Rosa de Yacuma, San Joaquín (Beni)

== Conflicts ==
NAABOL has faced several conflicts since its creation, including:

- In September 2024, heavy smoke caused by forest fires affected visibility at 20 of the 39 airports managed by NAABOL. As a result, operations were suspended at five commercial airports (Cobija Airport, Riberalta Airport, Guayaramerín Airport, Rurrenabaque Airport, and Trinidad Airport) and 15 secondary runways located in the departments of Beni and Santa Cruz.
- Some airports require infrastructure and equipment improvements to meet international standards and ensure operational safety.
- The transition from AASANA to NAABOL involved staff restructuring, generating challenges in training and retaining specialized talent.

== Safety ==
Operational safety is a priority for NAABOL. In April 2024, the Telecommunications and Transport Regulation and Supervision Authority (ATT) granted NAABOL the license for the use of 88 frequencies in the aeronautical band, thus regularizing the use of frequencies at airports in the country after 14 years. This measure seeks to optimize the quality and safety of air communications, in accordance with the recommendations of the International Civil Aviation Organization (ICAO).

In addition, NAABOL conducts meteorological monitoring every 15 minutes at airports to evaluate visibility conditions and make real-time operational decisions, especially during adverse weather situations.
