= Saul Farah =

Bolivian boxer

Personal information
- Nickname: El Fenix Asesino
- Born: Saúl Becerra Gil; 12 January 1983 (age 43) Santa Ana del Yacuma, Bolivia
- Height: 1.78 m (5 ft 10 in)
- Weight: Heavyweight

Boxing career
- Stance: Orthodox

Boxing record
- Total fights: 101
- Wins: 72
- Win by KO: 62
- Losses: 26
- Draws: 3

Saul Farah (born Saul Becerra Gil on January 12, 1983) is a Bolivian professional boxer. He is the Bolivian national former Heavyweight boxing champion, having won the title by knocking out 1-0 Romualdo Rivera in the first round on March 13, 2010. He defended the national title 15 times successfully, before losing it on his 16th defense. His nickname is "El Fenix Asesino" ("The Assassin Phoenix").

== Professional career ==
Farah was also Bolivian national Cruiserweight champion, title that he obtained September 2, 2008 with a third-round knockout of local, 3 win 9 losses journeyman Fernando Marcelo Vega at San Julian, Santa Cruz de la Sierra, the interim World Boxing Council Latino Heavyweight champion by beating 23-13-2 Esteban Hillman Tababary by twelve round unanimous decision on October 9, 2015, and the interim South American Heavyweight champion, championship which he won by defeating 13 win, 6 defeats and 2 ties (draws) prospect Guido Santana in the third round of their December 21, 2013 fight at Farah's hometown of Santa Ana del Yacuma. Farah is also the Santa Ana del Yacuma city, Beni Department and Santa Cruz de la Sierra Department Heavyweight champion, and he has once fought for world Heavyweight champion honors, albeit for an organization without much international recognition, the World Boxing Union. He lost that bout to Brazilian boxer Marcelo Ferreira dos Santos by third-round knockout on December 15, 2014, at Bahia, Brazil. Farah has also fought for World Boxing Association, World Boxing Organization and International Boxing Federation regional titles without success.

After a bout with Cesar Mamani, set for May 10, 2019,(a second-round technical knockout win) Farah traveled to the Philippines, where he fought American Ronald Johnson, 15–1 with 6 knockout wins, on June 15, 2019, in what would have been a bout for the Global Boxing Organization's Heavyweight world title, a title without much recognition by the general boxing world and fans alike. The GBO ultimately withdrew recognition of the fight as being for their championship, but Farrah and Johnson still boxed each other, with the American knocking the Bolivian down in the first round and prevailing by 12 rounds unanimous decision. Eventually, Farrah got his 70th career win five weeks later, when he defeated 1 win, 2 losses Luis Gregorio Castedo Yapovenda by second-round knockout on July 20 of that year, back home in Santa Ana del Yacuma, Bolivia.

On November 2, 2019, Farah traveled to the Democratic Republic of Congo to challenge Sadiki "The Buffalo" Maroy (15-2-1) for the vacant UBO Intercontinental Heavyweight title. After a spirited start, Maroy forced a TKO-7 stoppage of Farah earning the UBO title

On December 21, 2019, Farrah fought his 99th professional boxing match, being stopped in the first round by Christian Hammer in Germany.

Farah was scheduled to defend his Bolivian title in both March and April 2020; however, the COVID-19 pandemic forced postponements of both dates. Then, on October 30 of 2020, Farah defended his title versus Marco Kenny aka La Mole Viscarra over 12 rounds live on Pay Per View (PPV) at the Santa Rosita Coliseum in Santa Cruz, Bolivia. Farah controlled the pace for the majority of the bout but was unlucky in losing a 12-round decision – and relinquishing this title to Kenny

On December 22, 2020, Farah became the world's first fighter to hold a Bridgerweight title, defeating Rosendo 'La Furia' Mercado Eguez from Santa Cruz. Bolivia via 12-round decision for the Bolivian national Bridgerweight championship. The so-called Bridgerweight division is a division with little recognition among world sanctioning boxing organizations; only the World Boxing Council recognizes it.

Farah then defended his Bridgerweight title for the first time on April 3 in Santa Cruz de La Sierra, Bolivia. Farah earned a TKO-1 victory over Ruben Vargas Diaz

Farah intended to defend his Bridgerweight title of Bolivia for the second time on March 26, 2021; however, Farah's bout versus Pedro 'El Terrible' Guanichaba was not approved by the Bolivian commission in appropriate time. The bout was rescheduled to April 30, 2021, and again to May 21.

Farah and Pedro Tabares would finally meet on June 19 and the entire world would witness an assault in the ring on Farah's life. In the 6th round of their match in Tabares' home town of Pando, Tabares hit Farah with a heavy shot and then threw the champion to the canvas. Once Farah was on the canvas, Tabares jumped on Farah and begin to punch him while he was down as well as deliver three kicks to Farah's head and neck. Farah was awarded the victory by disqualification and while Tabares apologized later for his actions he was not suspended by the Bolivian commission and a rematch was ordered for August 21.

In the 12 round rematch on August 21 again in Pando, Bolivia, Farah would get his revenge. In what was a mostly slow first half of the bout, Farah began to come on in the championship rounds. In the 12th and final round, Farah would storm Tabares in the corner and let his hands go, landing a hard left to the right side of Tabares' head and ear. This concussive location would put Tabares down and upon the restart Farah landed some massive shots that caused the referee to jump in and call a halt to the action. Farah takes a TKO-12 victory and the interim Bolivian heavyweight title.

After the fight, Tabares would claim he was hit with an illegal blow and asked the Bolivian commission to take action and overturn the result and suspend Farah.

On October 30, 2020, Farah lost his Bolivian national Heavyweight title when outpointed over twelve rounds by the debuting Marco Kenny Viscarra at the Coliseo Arena Santa Rosita in Santa Cruz de La Sierra, Bolivia.

The last fight he had that appeared on his Boxrec page took place on December 12, 2020, when he beat Rosendo Mercado, 2 wins and 8 losses coming in, at the Palacio de los Deportes in Trinidad, Bolivia, by a twelve rounds unanimous decision.

Notably, Farah is also a boxing promoter, referee and matchmaker.

== Professional boxing record ==
101 fights	72 wins	26 losses
By knockout	62	18
By decision	9	8
By disqualification	1	0
Draws	3	

No.	Result	Record	Opponent	Type	Round, time	Date	Location	Notes
101	Win	72–26–3	Rosendo Mercado	UD	12	22 Dec 2020	Palacio de los Deportes, Trinidad, Bolivia	Won inaugural Bolivian bridgerweight title
100	Loss	71–26–3	Marco Kenny Viscarra	SD	12	30 Oct 2020	Coliseo Arena de Santa Rosita, Santa Cruz de la Sierra, Bolivia	Lost Bolivian heavyweight title
99	Loss	71–25–3	Christian Hammer	TKO	1 (8), 2:15	21 Dec 2019	Wiking Box Center, Wolgast, Germany	
98	Win	71–24–3	Cesar Mamani	TKO	2 (12), 1:45	5 Oct 2019	Coliseo Municipal - San Buena Ventura, Trinidad, Bolivia	
97	Win	70–24–3	Luis Gregorio Castedo Yapovenda	KO	2 (12), 1:05	20 Jul 2019	Santa Ana del Yacuma, Bolivia	
96	Loss	69–24–3	Ronald Johnson	UD	12	15 Jun 2019	The Enderun Tent at Azuela Cove, Barangay Lanang, Davao City, Philippines	
95	Win	69–23–3	Cesar Mamani	RTD	2 (12), 3:00	2 Mar 2019	Associacion Beniana Del Boxeo, Trinidad, Bolivia	Retained Bolivian heavyweight title
94	Win	68–23–3	Jorge David Urquiza Anez	TKO	4 (12), 2:55	25 Jan 2019	Associacion Beniana Del Boxeo, Trinidad, Bolivia	
93	Win	67–23–3	Cesar Mamani	TKO	3 (10), 2:50	11 Aug 2018	Associacion Beniana Del Boxeo, Trinidad, Bolivia	
92	Win	66–23–3	Rosendo Mercado	SD	12	23 Jun 2018	Coliseo Juan Evo Morales Ayma, Riberelta, Bolivia	Retained Bolivian heavyweight title
91	Loss	65–23–3	Zamig Athakishiyev	RTD	1 (6), 3:00	18 Apr 2018	Dom Pechati, Yekaterinburg, Russia	
90	Win	65–22–3	Cesar Mamani	RTD	5 (10), 3:00	15 Nov 2017	Associacion Beniana del Boxeo, Trinidad Bolivia	
89	Win	64–22–3	Ruben Jesús Pone Poichee	TKO	1 (10), 2:31	2 Sep 2017	Associacion Beniana del Boxeo, Trinidad, Bolivia	
88	Loss	63–22–3	Samir Nebo	KO	3 (8), 2:28	1 Jul 2017	Ballsport Arena, Dresden, Germany	
87	Win	63–21–3	Rosendo Mercado	TKO	5 (12), 2:00	17 May 2017	Associacion Beniana del Boxeo, Trinidad, Bolivia	Retained Bolivian heavyweight title
86	Loss	62–21–3	Zhang Junlong	KO	1 (12), 1:28	29 Mar 2017	Grand Regency Hotel, Qingdao, China	
85	Win	62–20–3	Ervin Chavez Vargas	TKO	2 (12), 0:45	4 Dec 2016	Coliseo Municipal de Yotau, Santa Cruz de la Sierra, Bolivia	
84	Win	61–20–3	Mauricio Mendia Guaji	TKO	1 (10), 2:01	20 Nov 2016	Coliseo Municipal Distrito 12, Santa Cruz de la Sierra, Bolivia	
83	Win	60–20–3	Bernardino Fernandez	RTD	4 (12)	5 Nov 2016	Coliseo Municipal de Colpa Belgica, Santa Cruz de la Sierra, Bolivia	
82	Win	59–20–3	Esteban Hillman Tababary	UD	10	8 Oct 2016	Estadio Gran Mamoré, Trinidad, Bolivia	
81	Win	58–20–3	Eddy Salvatierra	RTD	1 (8), 3:00	20 Aug 2016	Coliseo Municipal, Baures, Bolivia	
80	Loss	57–20–3	Adrian Granat	TKO	1 (10), 2:59	4 Jun 2016	Autohaus Duerkop, Kassel, Germany	
79	Win	57–19–3	Eddy Salvatierra	RTD	2 (10), 3:00	5 Mar 2016	Associacion Beniana del Boxeo, Trinidad, Bolivia	
78	Win	56–19–3	Esteban Hillman Tababary	RTD	8 (12), 3:00	9 Jan 2016	Centro Municipal de Eventos, Santa Rosa de Yacuma, Bolivia	Retained Bolivian heavyweight title
77	Win	55–19–3	Esteban Hillman Tababary	UD	12	9 Oct 2015	Associacion Beniana del Boxeo, Trinidad, Bolivia	WBC Latino interim heavyweight title at stake
76	Win	54–19–3	Juan Carlos Flores Choque	TKO	1 (12), 1:39	10 Jul 2015	Trinidad, Bolivia	Retained Bolivian heavyweight title
75	Win	53–19–3	Esteban Hillman Tababary	RTD	6 (12), 3:00	9 May 2012	Centro Municipal de Eventos, Santa Rosa de Yacuma	Retained Bolivian heavyweight title
74	Win	52–19–3	Ervin Chavez Vargas	KO	3 (12)	10 Apr 2015	Coliseo Cerrado, Ivirgarzama, Bolivia	
73	Loss	51–19–3	Vladimir Goncharov	TKO	1 (8), 2:02	1 Mar 2015	Boxing & Gym Academy, Moscow, Russia	
72	Win	51–18–3	Dante Olivares	RTD	1 (12), 3:00	31 Jan 2015	Asociacion Municipal del Boxeo Movima, Santa Rosa de Yacuma, Bolivia	
71	Win	50–18–3	Carlos Moya	RTD	1 (12), 3:00	17 Jan 2015	Associacion Municipal del Boxeo Movima, Santa Ana del Yacuma, Bolivia	
70	Loss	49–18–3	Marcelo Ferreira dos Santos	TKO	3 (12), 1:30	15 Dec 2014	Club dos Bancarios, Aflitos, Brazil	
69	Win	49–17–3	Jose Antonio Rodriguez	TKO	1 (12)	25 Jul 2014	Club Municipal, Santa Rosa del Sara, Bolivia	Retained Bolivian heavyweight title
68	Win	48–17–3	Rosendo Mercado	TKO	2 (12)	6 Jul 2014	Coliseo Municipal, San Pedro, Bolivia	Retained Bolivian heavyweight title
67	Win	47–17–3	Rosendo Mercado	TKO	2 (12)	24 May 2014	Coliseo Cerrado Don Bosco, Santa Fe, Bolivia	Retained Bolivian heavyweight title
66	Win	46–17–3	Rosendo Mercado	TKO	1 (12)	3 May 2014	Coliseo Municipal, Chimoré, Bolivia	Retained Bolivian heavyweight title
65	Win	45–17–3	Carmelo Roca	TKO	2 (12), 2:43	31 Jan 2014	Coliseo Municipal, San Miguel de Velasco, Bolivia	Retained Bolivian heavyweight title
64	Win	44–17–3	Guido Santana	TKO	3 (12)	21 Dec 2013	Poligimnasio Cerrado Romulo Cholima Suarez, Santa Ana del Yacuma, Bolivia	South American interim heavyweight title at stake
63	Loss	43–17–3	Chauncy Welliver	TKO	3 (10), 2:35	2 Jun 2013	Teatro Caupolicán, Santiago, Chile	
62	Win	43–16–3	Marcos Santana Juarez	RTD	3 (12), 3:00	12 Feb 2013	Coliseo Municipal, Exaltacion de la Cruz	Retained Bolivian heavyweight title
61	Win	42–16–3	Romualdo Fernandez	RTD	2 (12), 3:00	8 Dec 2012	Escenario Deportivo Nuestra Senora de Lourdes, Santa Ana del Yacuma	Retained Bolivian heavyweight title
60	Loss	41–16–3	Billy Wright	TKO	2 (12), 1:40	9 Nov 2012	Gimnasio Club Mexico, Santiago, Chile	For WBC Latino heavyweight title
59	Win	41–15–3	Carmelo Roca	TKO	2 (12)	11 Aug 2012	Club Social El Carretero, Exaltacion de la Cruz, Bolivia	
58	Win	40–15–3	John Okita Popeye	TKO	2 (12)	17 Mar 2012	Poligimnasio Cerrado Romulo Cholima Suarez, Santa Ana del Yacuma, Bolivia	Retained Bolivian heavyweight title
57	Win	39–15–3	Jose Aponte Kantuta	TKO	1 (12)	1 Feb 2012	Coliseo Municipal, Charagua, Bolivia	Retained Bolivian heavyweight title
56	Draw	38–15–3	Ronald Arancibia	PTS	4	7 Nov 2011	San Julián, Bolivia	
55	Win	38–15–2	Cleve Alexandre Moraez	TKO	1 (12)	23 Oct 2010	Poligimnasio Cerrado Romulo Cholima Suarez, Santa Ana del Yacuma, Bolivia	
54	Wih	37–15–2	Omer Salas	TKO	3 (12)	24 Sep 2011	Poligimnasio Cerrado Romulo Cholima Suarez, Santa Ana del Yacuma, Bolivia	
53	Win	36–15–2	Rosendo Mercado	RTD	2 (12), 3:00	28 Aug 2011	Balneario San Andres, Santa Ana del Yacuma, Bolivia	Retained Beni Department and Santa Ana del Yacuma City heavyweight titles
52	Win	35–15–2	Fernando Marcelo Vega	TKO	1 (12), 2:57	14 Aug 2011	Poligimnasio Cerrado Romulo Cholima Suarez, Santa Ana del Yacuma, Bolivia	
51	Win	34–15–2	Carlos Castedo	TKO	5 (12)	4 Aug 2011	Poligimnasio Cerrado Romulo Cholima Suarez, Santa Ana del Yacuma, Bolivia	
50	Win	33–15–2	Jose Antonio Rodriguez	RTD	3 (10), 3:00	25 May 2011	Poligimnasio Cerrado Romulo Cholima Suarez, Santa Ana del Yacuma, Bolivia	
49	Win	32–15–2	Romualdo Fernandez	RTD	1 (12), 3:00	13 May 2011	Balneario San Andres, Santa Ana del Yacuma, Bolivia	Retained Beni Department and Santa Ana del Yacuma City heavyweight titles
48	Win	31–15–2	Jose Monnroy Galvez	RTD	2 (12), 3:00	2 May 2011	Poligimnasio Cerrado Romulo Cholima Suarez, Santa Ana del Yacuma, Bolivia	Won vacant Beni Department and Santa Ana del Yacuma City heavyweight titles
47	Loss	30–15–2	Johann Duhaupas	TKO	2 (9), 1:30	2 Apr 2011	Roberto Durán Arena, Panama City, Panama	For vacant South American and WBA Fedebol heavyweight titles
46	Loss	30–14–2	Irineu Beato Costa Junior	TKO	2 (8), 1:31	1 Mar 2011	Ginasio Baby Barione, São Paulo, Brazil	
45	Loss	30–13–2	George Arias	RTD	2 (12), 0:40	31 Jul 2010	Ginásio do Ibirapuera, São Paulo, Brazil	For South American heavyweight title
44	Win	30–12–2	Bernardino Fernandez	RTD	1 (12), 3:00	5 Jun 2010	Coliseo Municipal de Ivirgarzama, Chapare, Bolivia	Retained Bolivian and Santa Cruz de la Sierra Department heavyweight title
43	Win	29–12–2	Romualdo Rivera	KO	1 (12), 2:11	13 May 2010	Coliseo Cerrado Municipal, Comarapa, Bolivia	Retained Bolivian heavyweight title
42	Win	28–12–2	Romualdo Rivera	RTD	1 (12), 3:00	13 Mar 2010	Coliseo Municipal, Vallegrande, Bolivia	Retained Bolivian and Santa Cruz de la Sierra Department heavyweight titles
41	Loss	27–12–2	Gonzalo Basile	TKO	8 (12), 2:59	13 Nov 2009	Club Atlético Huracán, Buenos Aires, Argentina	For WBO Latino heavyweight title
40	Draw	27–11–2	David Gutierrez	PTS	10	11 Jul 2009	El Torno, Santa Cruz de la Sierra, Bolivia	Retained Bolivian and Santa Cruz de la Sierra Department heavyweight titles
39	Win	27–11–1	Marcos Eduardo Bells	DQ	1 (6)	22 May 2009	Complejo Deportivo Municipal, General Mosconi, Argentina	
38	Loss	26–11–1	Raphael Zumbano	UD	9	20 Mar 2009	Centro Esportivo Robinho, São Vicente, Brazil	For WBA Fedebol heavyweight title
37	Win	26–10–1	Antonio Salas	UD	12	14 Feb 2009	Coliseo Municipal, Vallegrande, Bolivia	Won inaugural Bolivian and vacant Santa Cruz de la Sierra Department heavyweight titles
36	Loss	25–10–1	Raphael Zumbano	UD	9	21 Dec 2008	Centro Esportivo Robinho, São Vicente, Brazil	For inaugural WBA Fedebol heavyweight title
35	Loss	25–9–1	Manuel Alberto Pucheta	RTD	6 (10), 3:00	14 Nov 2008	Club Defensores de Villa Lujan, San Miguel de Tucumán, Argentina	For vacant WBC Latino heavyweight title
34	Win	25–8–1	Esteban Hillman Tababary	TKO	2 (10), 0:32	18 Oct 2008	Coliseo Municipal Cuatro Cañadas, Santa Cruz de la Sierra, Bolivia	
33	Win	24–8–1	Rosendo Mercado	TKO	1 (4), 2:54	7 Oct 2008	Coliseo Municipal Cuatro Cañadas, Santa Cruz de la Sierra, Bolivia	
32	Loss	23–8–1	Aaron Orlando Soria	UD	8	19 Sep 2008	Club Newell's Old Boys, Tartagal, Argentina	
31	Win	23–7–1	Fernando Marcelo Vega	TKO	3 (12)	2 Sep 2008	Coliseo Munifipal, San Julián, Santa Cruz de la Sierra, Bolivia	Won inaugural Bolivian cruiserweight title
30	Loss	22–7–1	Laudelino Barros	TKO	4 (10)	1 Aug 2008	Ginásio Verdinho, Cuiabá, Brazil	
29	Loss	22–6–1	Lawrence Tauasa	KO	3 (12), 1:12	4 Jul 2008	Bowman Centre, Blacktown, Sydney, Australia	For WBO Oriental and vacant PABA cruiserweight titles
28	Win	22–5–1	Paul Solares	TKO	2 (10), 2:10	20 Jun 2008	Coliseo Municipal, San Julián, Santa Cruz de la Sierra, Bolivia	
27	Win	21–5–1	Manuel Solis Hurtado	KO	3 (10)	23 May 2008	Salon de Eventos el Desegnano, Trinidad, Bolivia	
26	Win	20–5–1	Guido Santana	UD	10	9 May 2008	Discoteca Mad, Santa Cruz de la Sierra, Bolivia	
25	Win	19–5–1	Carmelo Roca	KO	5 (10)	26 Apr 2008	Gimnasio Municipal de Chane, Santa Cruz de la Sierra	
24	Win	18–5–1	Jose Aponte Kantuta	KO	3 (10)	15 Apr 2008	Coliseo Municipal San Xavier, Santa Cruz de la Sierra, Bolivia	
23	Win	17–5–1	Guido Santana	KO	8 (10)	18 Mar 2008	Coliseo Municipal San Xavier, Santa Cruz de la Sierra, Bolivia	
22	Win	16–5–1	Limber Mua Ivernagaray	KO	3 (10)	29 Dec 2007	Coliseo Municipal, Puerto Fernández Alonso, Bolivia	
21	Loss	15–5–1	Carl Davis Drumond	KO	2 (12), 1:38	15 Oct 2007	Hotel Barcelo San Jose Palacio, San José, Costa Rica	For vacant IBF Latino heavyweight title
20	Win	15–4–1	John Okita Popeye	UD	6	19 Sep 2007	Balneario Tomichucua, Riberalta, Bolivia	
19	Win	14–4–1	Jose Aponte Kantuta	KO	2 (10), 1:20	31 Aug 2007	Coliseo Municipal, Pailón, Bolivia	
18	Win	13–4–1	Manuel Solis Hurtado	TKO	2 (8), 2:51	6 Jul 2007	Coliseo Municipal, Chapare, Bolivia	
17	Loss	12–4–1	Kertson Manswell	TKO	7 (10)	26 Dec 2006	Jean Pierre Sports Complex, Mucurapo, Trinidad and Tobago	
16	Win	12–3–1	Manuel Solis Hurtado	KO	6 (10)	6 Nov 2006	Coliseo Municipal, Entre Ríos, Bolivia	
15	Win	11–3–1	Limber Mua Ivernegaray	KO	3 (10)	21 Oct 2006	Coliseo Cerrado, Ivirgarzama, Bolivia	
14	Win	10–3–1	Carmelo Roca	TKO	3 (10)	6 Oct 2006	Coliseo Cerrado, Villa Tunari, Bolivia	
13	Win	9–3–1	Walter Alba Melgar	KO	4 (10)	22 Sep 2006	Coliseo Cerrado, Ivirgarzama, Bolivia	
12	Win	8–3–1	Edigar Oliveira	TKO	2 (10)	6 Sep 2006	Coliseo Cerrado, Yapacaní, Bolivia	
11	Win	7–3–1	Jose Aponte Kantuta	TKO	4 (6)	21 Jul 2006	Mineros, Bolivia	
10	Win	6–3–1	Walter Alba Melgar	UD	8	30 Jun 2006	Montero, Bolivia	
9	Win	5–3–1	Carlos Moya	KO	1 (10)	21 Apr 2006	Camiri, Bolivia	
8	Win	4–3–1	Omer Salas	KO	2 (8)	18 Jan 2006	San Ramón, Bolivia	
7	Loss	3–3–1	Chiquilin Soria	UD	10	30 Dec 2005	Cobija, Bolivia	
6	Win	3–2–1	Carlos Castedo	KO	2 (10)	2 Oct 2005	San Joaquín, Bolivia	
5	Win	2–2–1	Walter Alba Melgar	KO	6 (10)	27 Aug 2005	Magdalena, Bolivia	
4	Win	1–2–1	Antonio Salas	UD	6	17 Apr 2005	Discoteca Mad, Santa Cruz de la Sierra, Bolivia	
3	Loss	0–2–1	David Gutierrez	UD	4	16 Dec 2004	Discoteca Mad, Santa Cruz de la Sierra, Bolivia	
2	Draw	0–1–1	Walter Alba Melgar	PTS	4	2 Dec 2004	Portachuelo, Bolivia	
1	Loss	0–1	David Gutierrez	UD	4	25 Nov 2004	Disctoteca Mad, Santa Cruz de la Sierra, Bolivia	
