= Santa Ana del Yacuma =

- Town and municipality
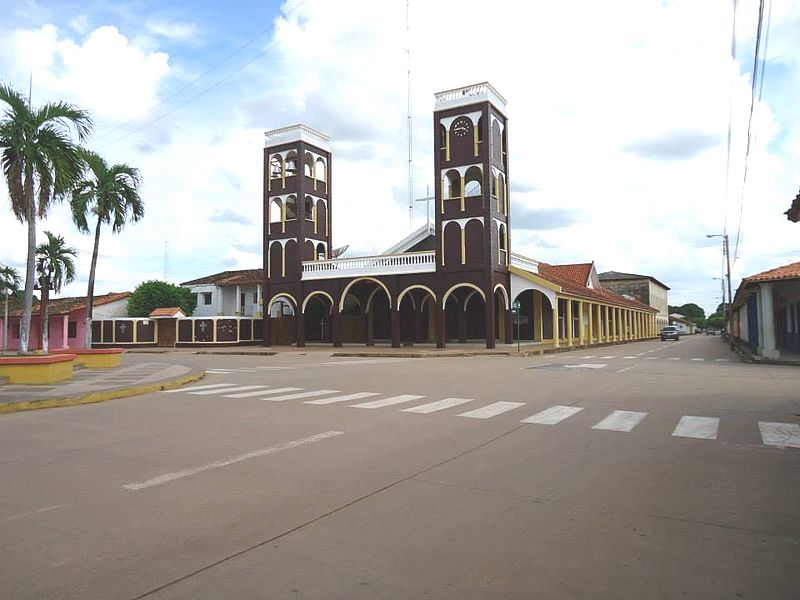
- Church in Santa Ana

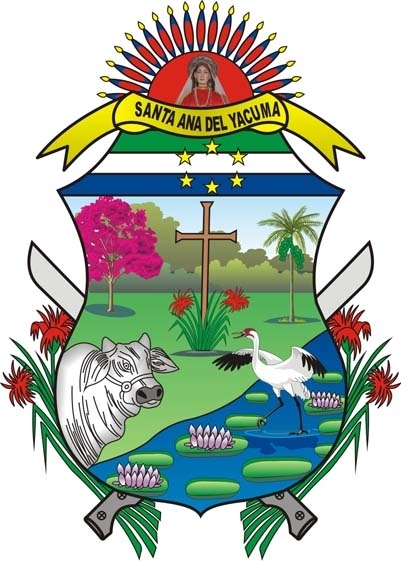
- Seal

- Location of Santa Ana in Bolivia
- Coordinates: 13°44′40″S 65°25′37″W
- Country: Bolivia
- Department: Beni Department
- Province: Yacuma Province
- Municipality: Santa Ana del Yacuma Municipality
- Elevation: 472 ft (144 m)

Population (est. 2008)
  - Total: 12,783
- Time zone: UTC-4 (BOT)

Santa Ana del Yacuma (also Santa Ana) is a town in the Beni Department in north-eastern Bolivia.

== History ==
The Jesuit mission of Santa Ana was founded in 1719. Movima Indians resided at the mission. Today, the Movima language is still spoken in and around the town.

== Location ==
Santa Ana is the capital of the Yacuma Province and the Santa Ana del Yacuma Municipality, located at an elevation of 144 m above sea level, where the Yacuma River meets the Mamoré River. Santa Ana is located 150 Kilometer north-west of Trinidad, the department's capital. The city has an Airport, the Santa Ana del Yacuma Airport, which is located just outside the city.

== Population ==
The town population has decreased from 14,788 (census 1992) to 12,944 (census 2001) and 12,783 (2008 estimate).

== Climate ==
The yearly precipitation of the region is 1,700 mm, with a distinct dry season from May to September. Monthly average temperatures vary from 24 °C to 29 °C over the year. According to the Köppen classification system Santa Ana del Yacuma has a Tropical savanna climate, abbreviated "Aw", bordering on a Tropical monsoon climate.

Climate data for Santa Ana del Yacuma, elevation 144 m (472 ft)
Month	Jan	Feb	Mar	Apr	May	Jun	Jul	Aug	Sep	Oct	Nov	Dec	Year
Mean daily maximum °C (°F)	31.6 (88.9)	31.3 (88.3)	31.6 (88.9)	31.4 (88.5)	30.2 (86.4)	30.0 (86.0)	30.6 (87.1)	32.4 (90.3)	33.1 (91.6)	33.3 (91.9)	32.4 (90.3)	31.8 (89.2)	31.6 (88.9)
Daily mean °C (°F)	27.4 (81.3)	27.2 (81.0)	27.5 (81.5)	27.0 (80.6)	25.3 (77.5)	24.3 (75.7)	23.9 (75.0)	25.3 (77.5)	26.6 (79.9)	27.6 (81.7)	27.5 (81.5)	27.4 (81.3)	26.4 (79.5)
Mean daily minimum °C (°F)	23.2 (73.8)	23.1 (73.6)	23.4 (74.1)	22.7 (72.9)	20.3 (68.5)	18.6 (65.5)	17.2 (63.0)	18.2 (64.8)	20.0 (68.0)	21.9 (71.4)	22.5 (72.5)	23.0 (73.4)	21.2 (70.1)
Average precipitation mm (inches)	254.8 (10.03)	246.5 (9.70)	205.2 (8.08)	134.4 (5.29)	77.0 (3.03)	30.6 (1.20)	24.6 (0.97)	31.7 (1.25)	81.2 (3.20)	141.4 (5.57)	197.5 (7.78)	233.0 (9.17)	1,657.9 (65.27)
Average precipitation days	13.6	13.2	11.4	7.3	5.5	2.7	2.0	2.2	4.4	7.6	9.5	11.9	91.3
Average relative humidity (%)	76.6	77.7	77.0	75.4	73.0	71.0	65.8	60.5	60.8	66.3	71.1	77.3	71.0
Source: Servicio Nacional de Meteorología e Hidrología de Bolivia

== Notable residents ==
- Saul Farrah, boxer
- Angélica Larrea, Afro-Bolivian queen
- Roberto Suárez Gómez, drug lord
