= SLSU =

SLSU may refer to:

- Southern Leyte State University
- Southern Luzon State University
- ICAO code for Juana Azurduy de Padilla International Airport in Sucre, Bolivia.
