= Yacuma Province =

- Province
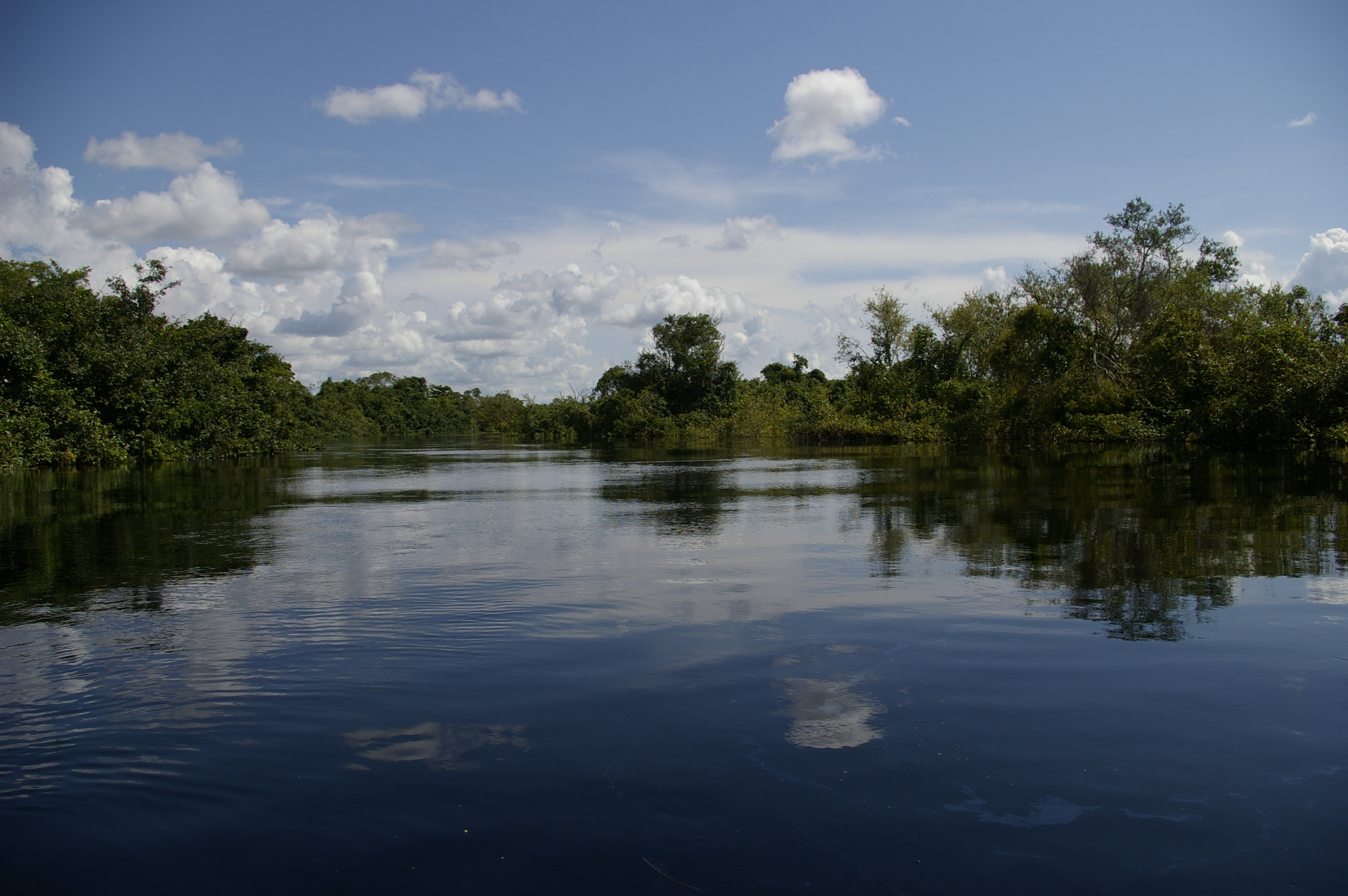
- Yacuma River

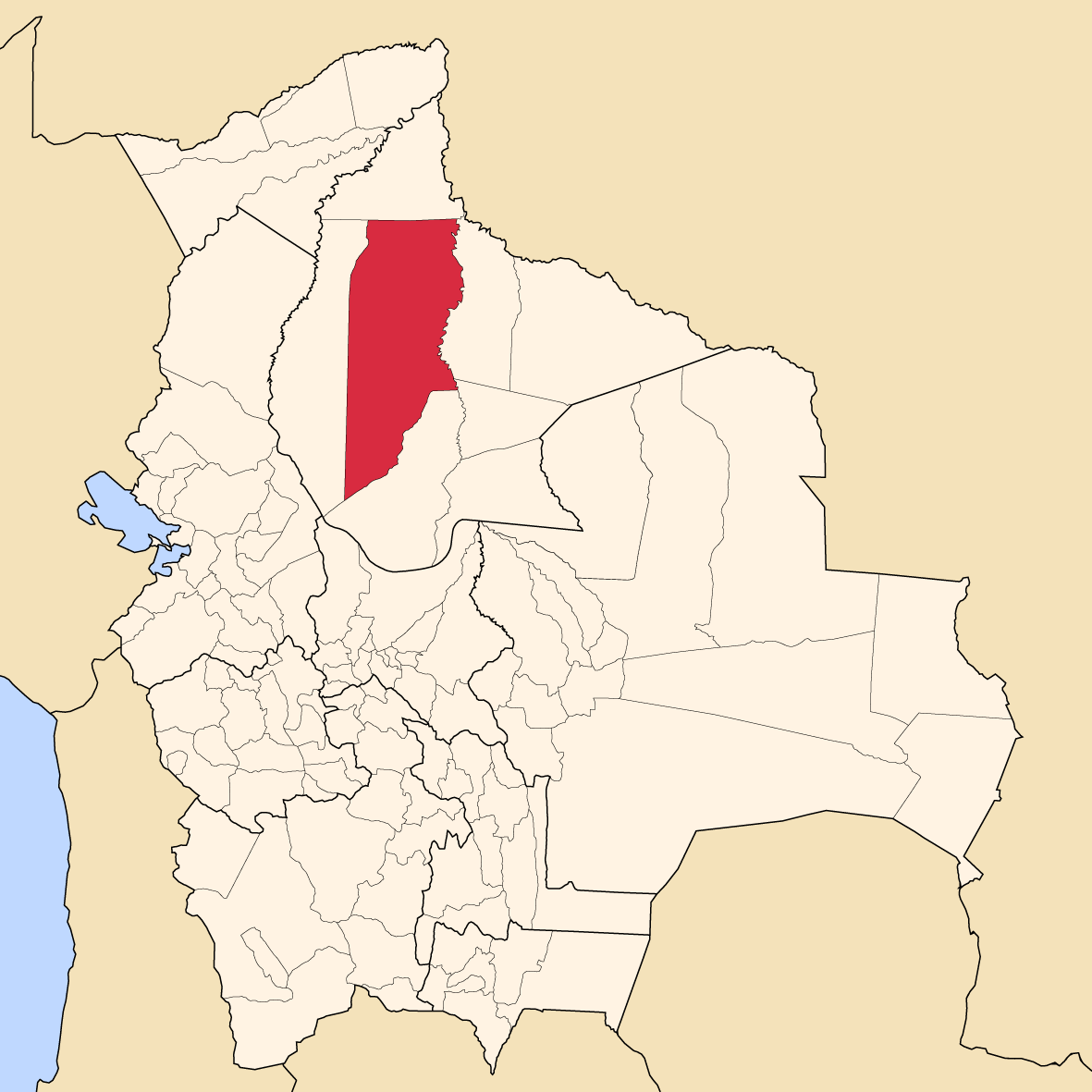
- Location of Yacuma Province within Bolivia

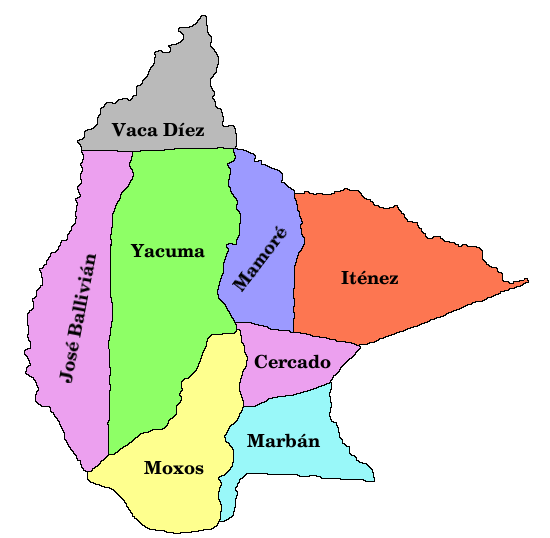
- Provinces of the Beni Department
- Coordinates: 13°35′0″S 65°55′0″W
- Country: Bolivia
- Department: Beni Department
- Capital: Santa Ana del Yacuma

Government
  - Mayor: Gustavo Alberto Antelo (2008)

Area
  - Total: 13,392 sq mi (34,686 km^{2})

Population (2024 census)
  - Total: 25,992
  - Density: 1.9408/sq mi (0.74935/km^{2})
- Time zone: UTC-4 (BOT)

Yacuma is a province in the Beni Department in Bolivia. Its seat is Santa Ana del Yacuma.

== Subdivision ==
Yacuma Province is divided into two municipalities which are partly further subdivided into cantons.

Section	Municipality	Inhabitants (2001)	Seat	Inhabitants (2001)
1st	Santa Ana Municipality	22,430	Santa Ana del Yacuma	12,877
2nd	Exaltación Municipality	6,618	Exaltación	1,610

== Places of interest ==
- Beni Biological Station Biosphere Reserve
- Lake Huaytunas
