= Exaltación, Mamoré =

Exaltación, Mamore
- Location of Exaltación, Mamore town in Bolivia
- Coordinates: 13°16′S 65°15′W
- Country: Bolivia
- Department: Beni Department
- Province: Yacuma Province
- Time zone: UTC-4 (BOT)

Exaltación (or Exaltation of the Holy Cross) is a town in Yacuma Province in the Beni Department of northern Bolivia.

== History ==
The Jesuit mission of Exaltación was founded in 1709. Cayubaba Indians resided at the mission.
