= Movima language =

Language isolate of Bolivia

Movima
- Chosineɬ di' mowi:maj
- Native to: Bolivia
- Region: Beni Department
- Ethnicity: Movima people
- Native speakers: 1,000 (2012)
- Language family: Language isolate

Official status
- Official language in: Bolivia

Language codes
- ISO 639-3: mzp
- Glottolog: movi1243
- ELP: Movima
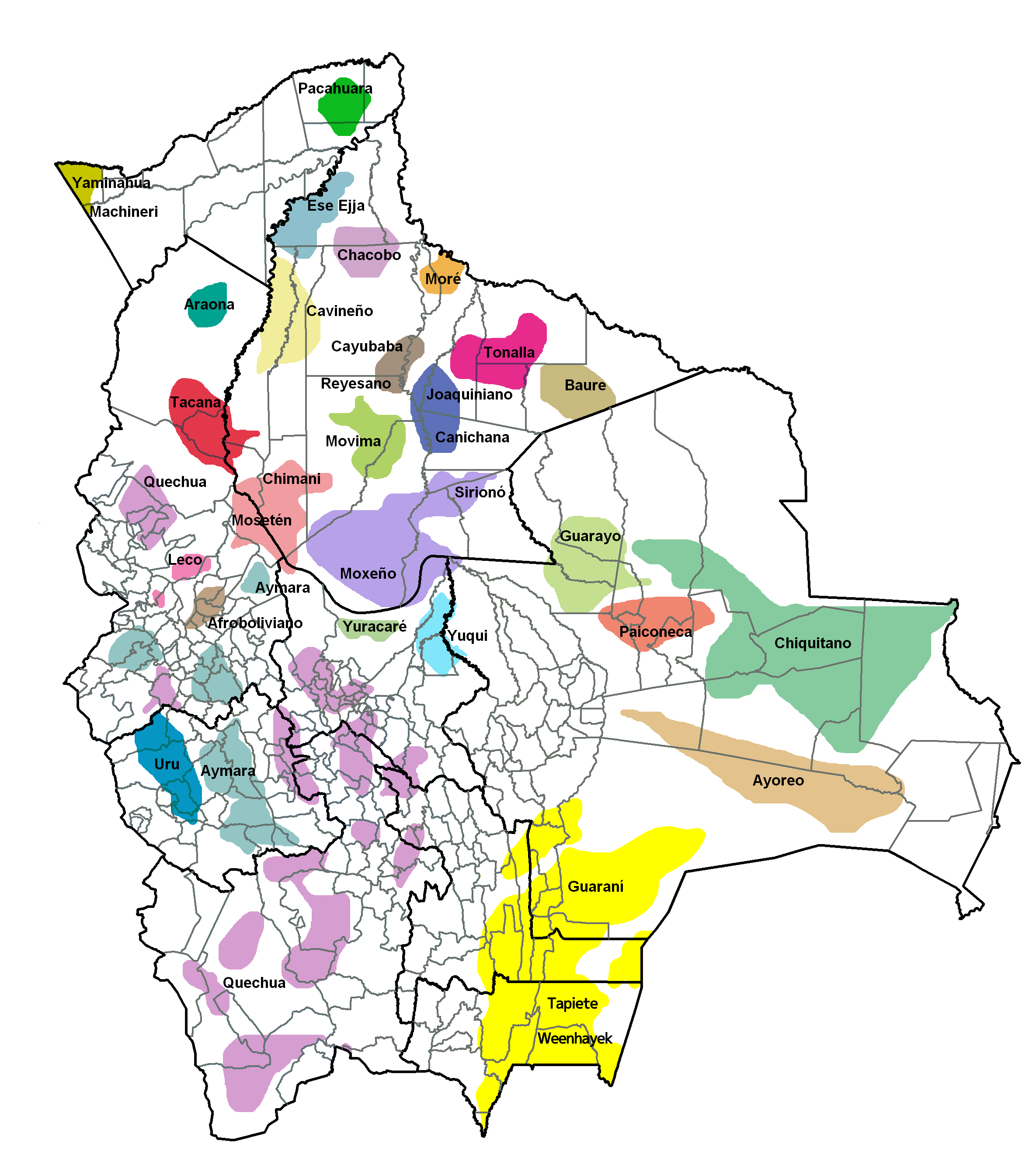
- Map of indigenous groups in Bolivia, with Movima in light green

Movima (Movima: Chosineɬ di' mowi:maj) is a language that is spoken by about 1,400 (nearly half) of the Movima, a group of Indigenous people of the Llanos de Moxos region of the Bolivian Amazon, in northeastern Bolivia. It is considered a language isolate, as it has not been proven to be related to any other language.

== Locations ==
Movima is spoken in the locations of 18 de Noviembre, 20 de Enero, Bella Flor, Buen Día, Carmen de Iruyañez, Carnavales, Ipimo, Miraflores, Navidad, San Lorenzo, and the town of Santa Ana del Yacuma. The Movima community reported that there are approximately 500 adult speakers as of 2012.

== Phonology ==
Movima has five vowels:

The vowels of Movima
	Front	Central	Back
Close	i		u
Mid	e		o
Open		a	

/e/ and /o/ more closely resemble [ɛ] and [ɔ], respectively, than the close-mid vowels [e] and [o]. Vowels have a phonemic length distinction, although some prosodic processes can lengthen otherwise short vowels. Movima does not have tone.

The consonants of Movima
		Labial	Alveolar		Palatal	Velar		Glottal
		Labial	median	lateral	Palatal	plain	lab.	Glottal
Nasal		m	n					
Stop	pulmonic	p	t		tʃ	k (ɡ)	kʷ	(ʔ)
Stop	implosive	ɓ	ɗ					
Fricative		(f) β	s	ɬ				h
Approximant				l	j	w		jˀ
Trill			r					

The plosive /p/ is realized as [p] in the syllable onset but as [pʔᵐ] (which contrasts with the simple nasal phoneme /m/) in the coda. Similarly, /t/ and /k/ are realized as [tʔⁿ] and [ʔ^{ɤ}] (i.e., as a glottal stop with a vocalic release), respectively, in the syllable coda. In vowel-initial words and between adjacent vowels, an epenthetic glottal stop appears.

The phonemes /f/ and /ɡ/ are only present in Spanish loanwords.

== Morphology ==
In Movima, compounding and incorporation are productive derivational processes. Reduplication and affixation, including some processes (such as the irrealis marker (k)a') that resemble infixation, are also common. Typical examples of inflection, such as number, case, tense, mood, and aspect, are not obligatorily marked in Movima. Many derivational processes can be applied to a single Movima word. The same morpheme may appear multiple times in one word this way, for instance, tikoy-na-poj-na "I make X kill Y."

== See also ==
- Llanos de Moxos (archaeology)
