= Alcantarí Airport =

Commercial airport serving Sucre, Bolivia

Alcantarí International Airport Aeropuerto internacional Alcantarí
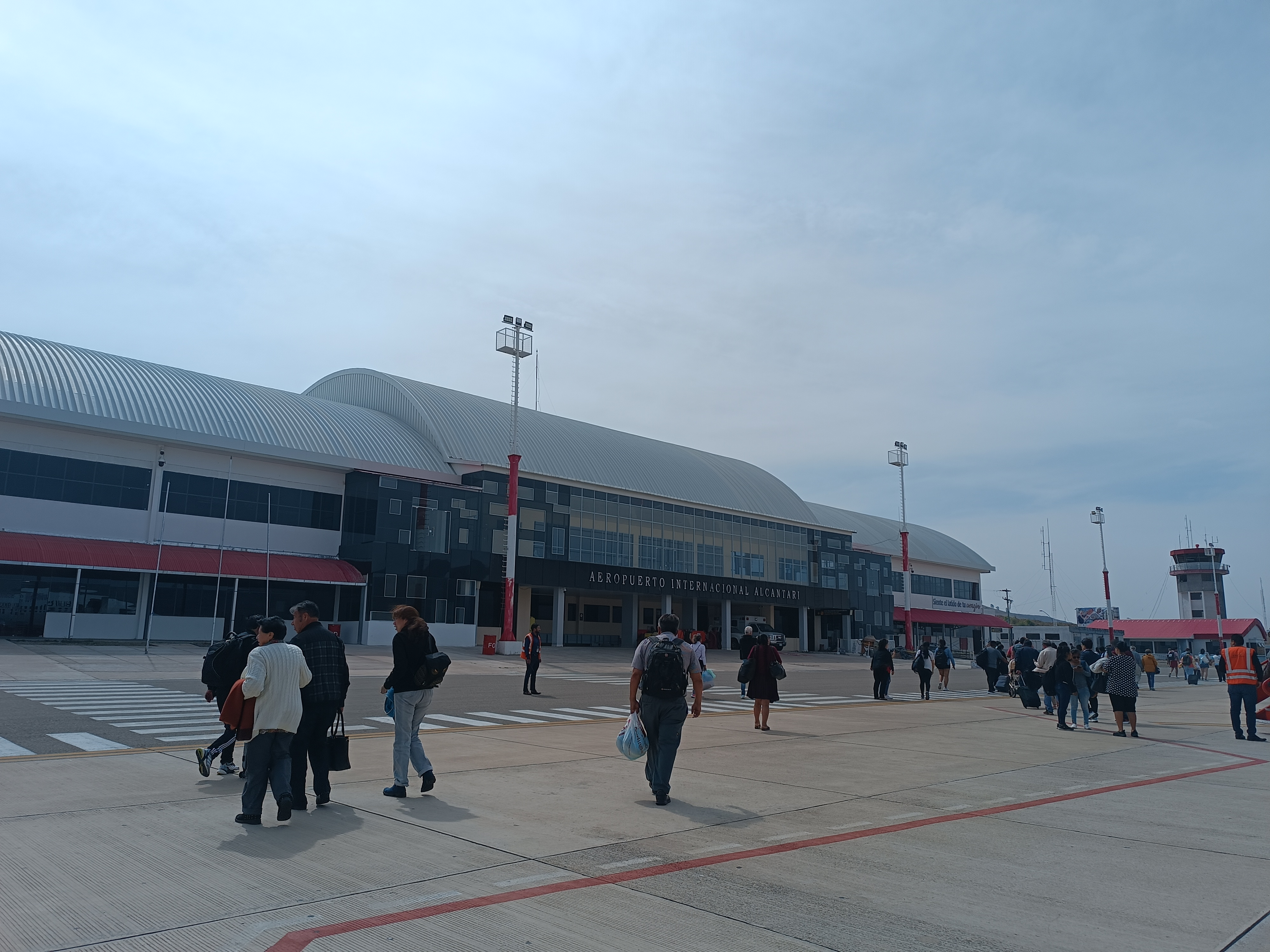
- IATA: SRE; ICAO: SLAL

Summary
- Airport type: Public
- Operator: Navegación Aérea y Aeropuertos Bolivianos (NAABOL)
- Serves: Sucre, Chuquisaca
- Location: Yamparáez, Bolivia
- Opened: 15 May 2016; 10 years ago
- Elevation AMSL: 10,184 ft / 3,104 m
- Coordinates: 19°14′48.606″S 65°8′58.601″W

Map
- Location of airport in Bolivia

Runways
Direction	Length		Surface
Direction	m	ft	Surface
18/36	3,600	11,811	Asphalt

Statistics (2023)
- 521,844

Alcantarí International Airport (IATA: SRE, ICAO: SLAL) is the main airport serving Sucre, Bolivia, the nation's constitutional capital city. It is located approximately 32 km (20 mi) southeast of Sucre, in the Yamparáez municipality. It was inaugurated on 15 May 2016 to replace the former Juana Azurduy de Padilla International Airport, whose operational limitations caused by its challenging conditions impeded the city’s connectivity.

The airport introduced a 24-hour service, markedly improving upon its predecessor. Passenger volume reached 521,844 travelers in 2023, evidencing its consolidation as a regional hub. The airport is primarily served by the country's main carrier, Boliviana de Aviación as well as other airlines such as EcoJet and TAMep. It has connections to Bolivia’s principal urban centers.

== History ==
The airport replaces the Juana Azurduy de Padilla International Airport that ceased commercial flights due to continuous complaints about security issues. In 2011 the construction of the new airport finally started, the first commercial flight was made on May 15, and on May 25, 2016, the operations officially started.

== Characteristics ==
The modern airport has a platform of 28,000 m^{2}, a passenger terminal of 5.660 m^{2}, a 3600 m track and all airport property comprises some 345 hectares.

Unlike the old Sucre airport, this airport can have night operations, plus the airport project will continue until 2020 to improve it even more, and get to have a cargo terminal and be an international airport.

== Airlines and destinations ==
Airlines	Destinations
Boliviana de Aviación	Cochabamba, La Paz, Santa Cruz de la Sierra–Viru Viru
EcoJet	Cochabamba, Santa Cruz de la Sierra–Viru Viru
