= Yacuiba Airport =

Airport in Bolivia

- IATA: BYC; ICAO: SLYA

Summary
- Airport type: Public
- Serves: Yacuíba
- Elevation AMSL: 2,116 ft / 645 m
- Coordinates: 21°57′40″S 63°39′07″W

Map
- Location of airport in Bolivia

Runways
| Direction | Length | | Surface |
| Direction | m | ft | Surface |
|---|---|---|---|
| 02/20 | 2,100 | 6,890 | Asphalt |
- Sources: GCM Google Maps

Yacuiba Airport (Spanish: Aeropuerto Yacuiba, IATA: BYC, ICAO: SLYA) is an airport located 4 kilometres (2.5 mi) north of Yacuiba, a city in the Tarija Department of Bolivia.

The runway is in a north–south aligned valley, with rising terrain to the east, and the Cordillera Central mountains 2.5 kilometres (1.6 mi) to the west.

The Yacuiba non-directional beacon (Ident: YAC) is located on the field.

== Airlines and destinations ==
| Airlines | Destinations |
|---|---|
| Boliviana de Aviación | Tarija |

== Accidents, Disasters, and incidents ==
- On 4 February 1964, a Douglas C-47 Skytrain operated by Lloyd Aéreo Boliviano crashed shortly after takeoff killing two.
- 20 October 1973, A Boeing 737 operated by Aerolíneas Argentinas was highjacked and landed at Yacuiba where 38 passengers were released.
- 2 June 1980, A Fairchild F-27 operated by Lloyd Aéreo Boliviano crashed while on Approach to the airport killing all 13 people on board.
- 17 January 2003, A British Aerospace Jetstream operated by Servicio Aéreo Vargas España crashed shortly into trees while attempting to take off, no one was killed.

== See also ==
- Transport in Bolivia
- List of airports in Bolivia
