= Captain Nicolas Rojas Airport =

Airport in Bolivia

Capitán Nicolas Rojas Airport Aeropuerto Capitán Nicolas Rojas
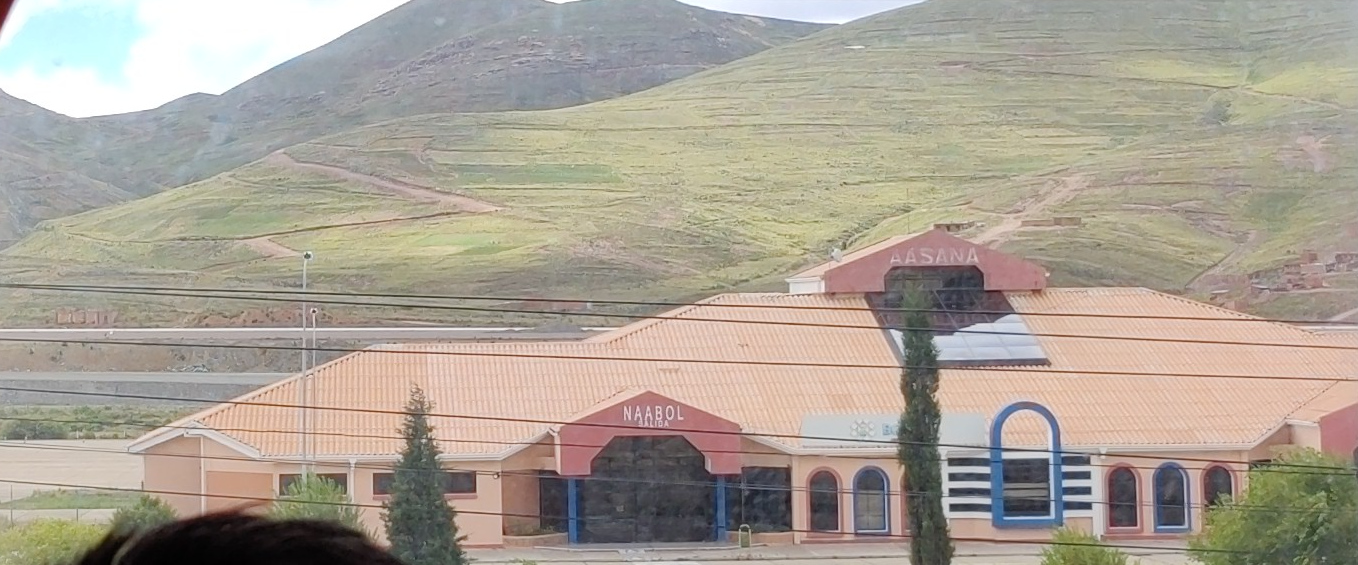
- IATA: POI; ICAO: SLPO

Summary
- Airport type: Public
- Operator: Government
- Serves: Potosí, Bolivia
- Elevation AMSL: 12,922 ft (3,939 m)
- Coordinates: 19°32′35″S 065°43′25″W

Map
- Location of the airport in Bolivia

Runways
Direction	Length		Surface
Direction	m	ft	Surface
06/24	2,833	9,295	Asphalt
- Sources: Google Maps AASANA WAD GCM

Capitán Nicolas Rojas Airport (Spanish: Aeropuerto Capitán Nicolas Rojas, IATA: POI, ICAO: SLPO) is an extremely high elevation airport serving the city of Potosí, the capital of the Potosí Department in Bolivia.

The runway is in a shallow valley 4 kilometres (2.5 mi) northeast of the city, with mountainous terrain in a quadrants.

The Potosi VOR-DME (Ident: PTS) is located 1.4 nautical miles (2.6 km) off the approach threshold of Runway 24. The Potosi non-directional beacon (Ident: POI) is located on the field.

== Airlines and destinations ==
Airlines	Destinations
Boliviana de Aviación	Cochabamba, La Paz, Santa Cruz de la Sierra–Viru Viru

== See also ==
- Transport in Bolivia
- List of airports in Bolivia
