= Forest fires in Bolivia in 2024 =

The Forest fires in Bolivia in 2024 or 2024 Bolivian Wildfires are a set of fires that started between July 8 and July 10, 2024, with multiple outbreaks starting in the Llanos de Chiquitos and Bolivian Amazon regions, with the highest concentration between the departments of Beni and Santa Cruz.

== Background ==
In Bolivia, the practice of "chaqueo" is common, being the "chaqueo" a practice of deforestation in a field, usually to be used for crop or livestock raising. The practice consists of removing vegetation from an area and then burning it. In theory, "chaqueo" is considered a crime of arson.

However, in practice, this slash-and-burn operations are permitted by the government due to the so-called "incendiary laws", a package of measures and legislation approved by the government of Evo Morales (2006–2019), upheld by Luis Arce Catacora's government.

On July 9, the Vice Minister of Civil Defense reported that the Integrated Forest Monitoring System (SIMB) had recorded 1,251 hot spots and one forest fire throughout Bolivian territory, of which 891 were recorded in the department of Beni, most of the hot spots were caused by the beginning of the "slash-and-burn period". The fire that SIMB reported started in the municipality of San José de Chiquitos.
