= Juana Azurduy de Padilla International Airport =

Military airport serving Sucre, Bolivia

Juana Azurduy de Padilla International Airport Aeropuerto Internacional Juana Azurduy de Padilla
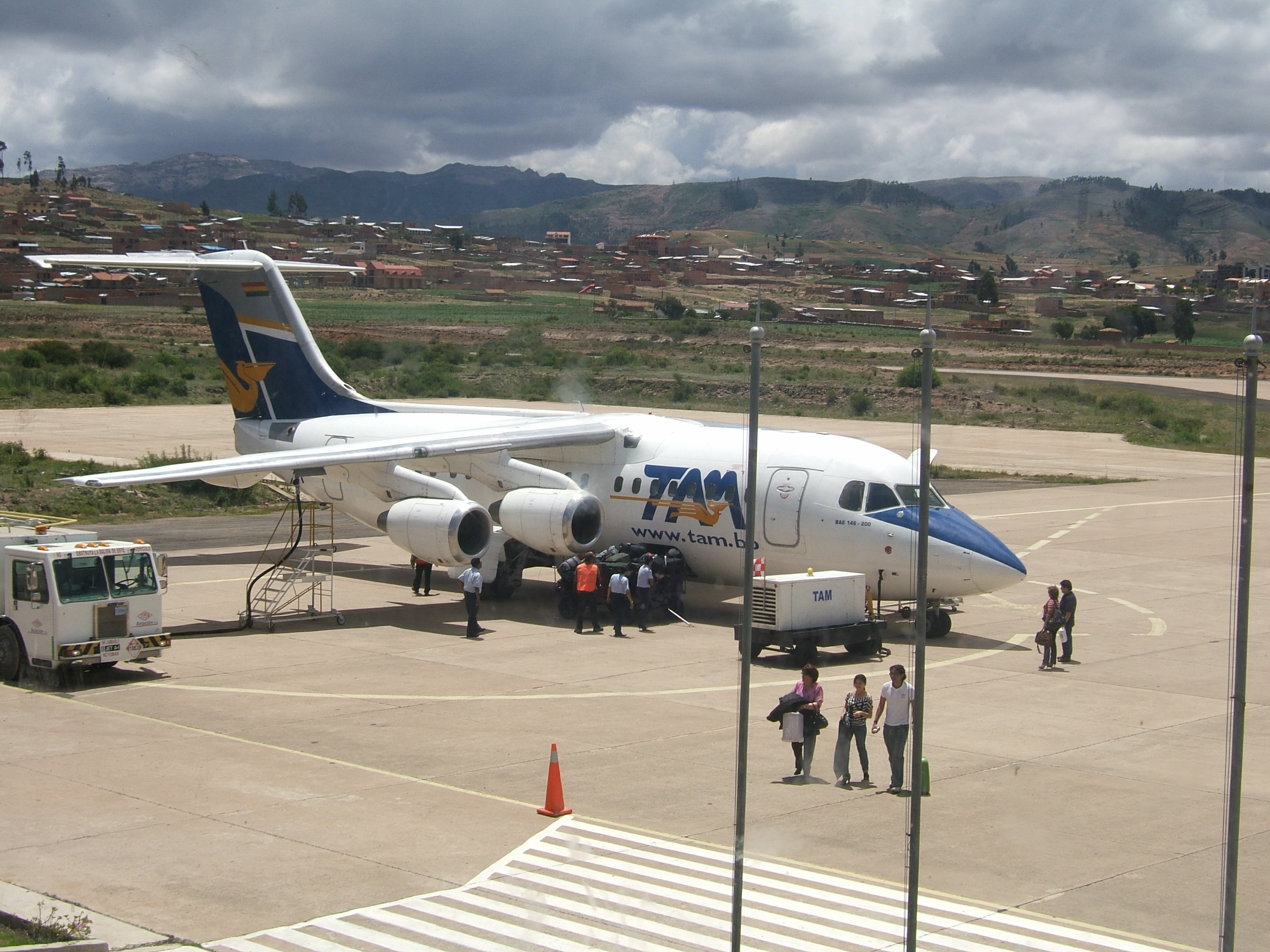
- IATA: ~~SRE~~; ICAO: SLSU

Summary
- Airport type: Military
- Operator: Bolivian Air Force
- Serves: Sucre
- Location: Sucre
- Passenger services ceased: 15 May 2016
- Elevation AMSL: 9,527 ft / 2,904 m
- Coordinates: 19°00′25″S 65°17′19″W

Map
- Location of airport in Bolivia

Runways
Direction	Length		Surface
Direction	ft	m	Surface
05/23	9,300	2,835	Concrete

Juana Azurduy de Padilla International Airport (ICAO: SLSU) is an airport located in Sucre, Bolivia, the nation's constitutional capital city. It is currently a base of the Bolivian Air Force and was formerly Sucre's main commercial airport until it was replaced by the Alcantarí Airport.

The only runway at Juana Azurduy de Padilla is 9,400 feet (2,900 m) in length, and at an altitude of 9,528 feet (2,904 m). Because of this high altitude, many people who arrived at Sucre via rapid air travel get altitude sickness. The altitude also caused the airport to be excessively cloudy at times, making approach difficult.

As with many in Latin America, Juana Azurduy de Padilla International Airport was not open 24 hours a day. It was only open from sunrise to sunset.

Though Sucre is Bolivia's constitutional (de jure) capital city, Juana Azurduy de Padilla International Airport was not the largest airport in the country. The largest airport is Viru Viru in Santa Cruz de la Sierra.

The airport was named after Juana Azurduy de Padilla, who fought for the independence against Spain.

On May 15, 2016, after 41 years of service, the Juana Azurduy de Padilla International Airport ended its commercial flight service, and all its operations moved to Alcantarí Airport. On 2017, the administration of the airport passed from AASANA to the military, turning the airport into an air force base.
