= Todos Santos, Beni =

Coordinates: 13.2486°S 63.7548°W

Todos Santos is a town in Bolivia. It is located in Beni Department, more exactly in Iténez Province near Río Baures river.
