= Chimoré, Santa Cruz =

Chimoré
- Location in Bolivia
- Coordinates: 17°18′S 63°27′W
- Country: Bolivia
- Department: Santa Cruz Department
- Time zone: UTC-4 (BOT)

Chimoré is a village in Santa Cruz Department, Bolivia.
