= Santa Ana Municipality, Beni =

Coordinates: 12°50′S 65°50′W

Santa Ana Municipality (Bolivia)
- Municipality
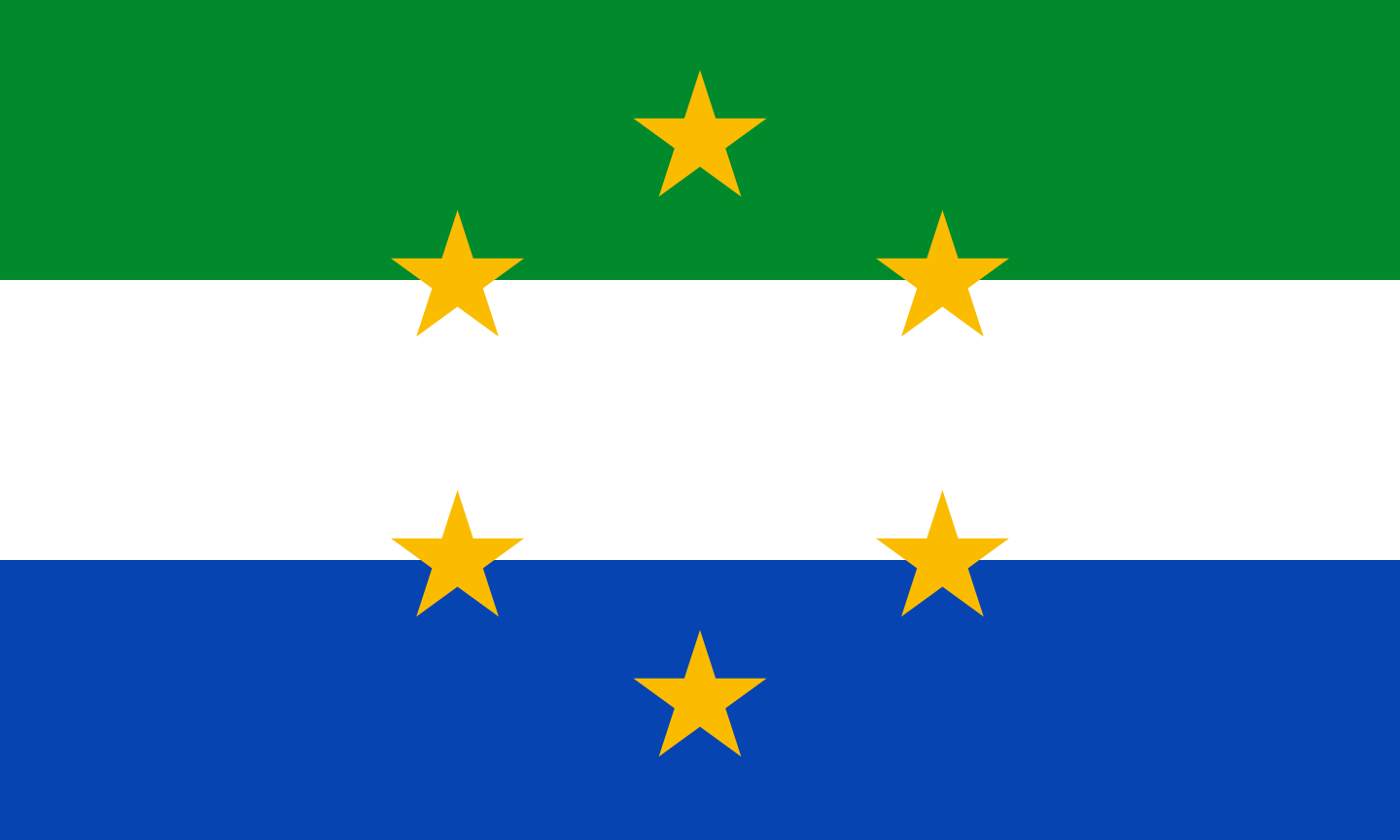
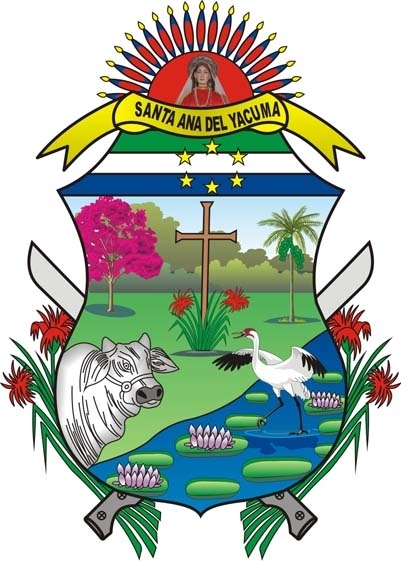
- Flag Coat of arms
- Interactive map of Santa Ana Municipality (Bolivia)
- Country: Bolivia
- Department: Beni Department
- Province: Yacuma Province

Population (2010)
  - Total: 16,291
- Time zone: UTC-4 (BOT)

Santa Ana Municipality or Santa Ana del Yacuma Municipality is a municipality of the Beni Department, Bolivia.
