= Movima people =

Bolivian ethnic group

The Movima people are an ethnic group in Bolivia. There were 18,879 of them in 2012, of whom 675 speak the Movima language natively.
