= San Joaquín, Bolivia =

San Joaquín
- town
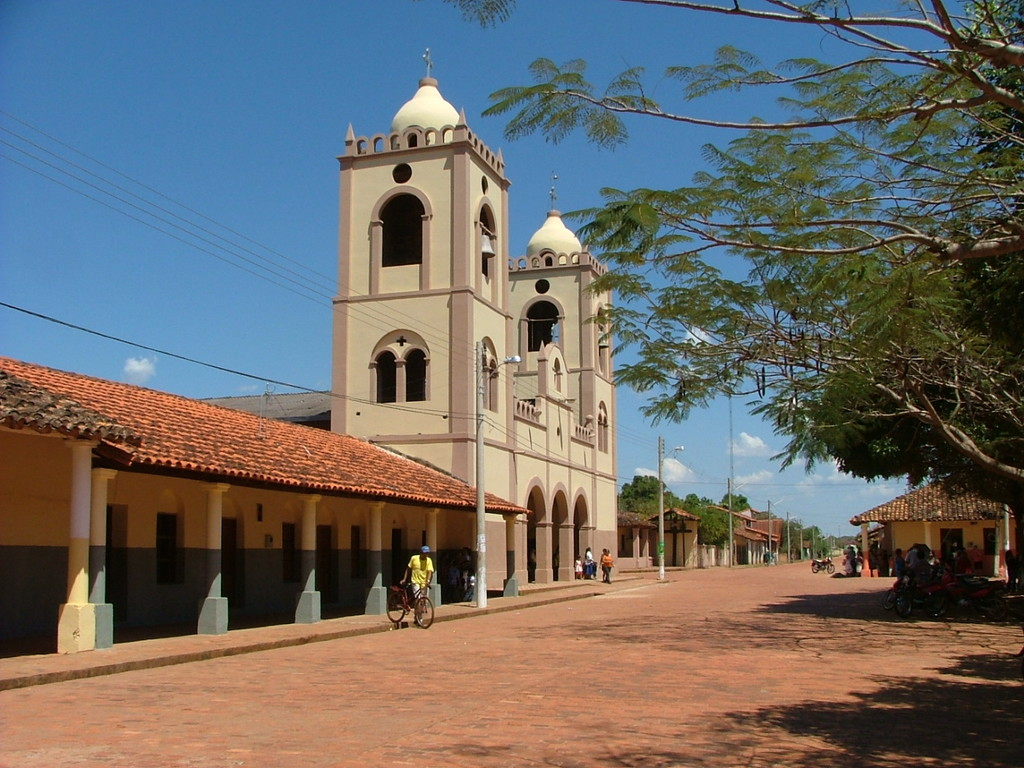
- San Joaquín Mission Church

- Location of San Ignacio in Bolivia
- Coordinates: 13°02′29″S 64°40′05″W
- Country: Bolivia
- Department: Beni Department
- Province: Mamoré Province
- Elevation: 466 ft (142 m)

Population (est. 2009)
  - Total: 4,589
- Time zone: UTC-4 (BOT)

San Joaquín is a small agricultural town in the Beni Department in the Bolivian lowlands.

It is served by San Joaquín Airport.

== History ==
The Jesuit mission of San Joaquín was founded in 1709. Baure Indians resided at the mission.

== Languages ==
Camba Spanish is the primary vernacular lingua franca spoken in the town. The Joaquiniano dialect of Baure was also spoken in San Joaquín.

== Location ==
San Joaquín is the administrative capital of Mamoré Province and is at an elevation of 142 m above sea level. It is just west of the Machupo River, a tributary of the Iténez River.

San Joaquín is 220 kilometres (140 mi) north of Trinidad, the department's capital.

== Geography ==
San Joaquín is located in the Moxos Plains (Llanos de Moxos), at 100,000 km^{2} one of the greatest wetlands of the Earth. Main vegetation in the area of San Joaquín is the tropical savanna.

== Climate ==
The yearly precipitation of the region is 1,800 mm, with a distinct dry season from May to September. Monthly average temperatures vary from 24 °C und 29 °C over the year.

Climate data for San Joaquín, elevation 139 m (456 ft)
Month	Jan	Feb	Mar	Apr	May	Jun	Jul	Aug	Sep	Oct	Nov	Dec	Year
Record high °C (°F)	37.1 (98.8)	38.0 (100.4)	38.0 (100.4)	37.2 (99.0)	37.4 (99.3)	37.5 (99.5)	38.0 (100.4)	39.5 (103.1)	40.1 (104.2)	39.6 (103.3)	38.5 (101.3)	37.6 (99.7)	40.1 (104.2)
Mean daily maximum °C (°F)	31.5 (88.7)	31.4 (88.5)	31.5 (88.7)	31.4 (88.5)	30.4 (86.7)	30.3 (86.5)	31.4 (88.5)	33.2 (91.8)	33.6 (92.5)	33.6 (92.5)	32.5 (90.5)	31.8 (89.2)	31.9 (89.4)
Daily mean °C (°F)	27.1 (80.8)	27.0 (80.6)	27.2 (81.0)	26.8 (80.2)	25.5 (77.9)	24.4 (75.9)	24.2 (75.6)	25.6 (78.1)	27.1 (80.8)	27.8 (82.0)	27.4 (81.3)	27.2 (81.0)	26.4 (79.6)
Mean daily minimum °C (°F)	22.8 (73.0)	22.6 (72.7)	22.8 (73.0)	22.2 (72.0)	20.4 (68.7)	18.6 (65.5)	17.1 (62.8)	18.0 (64.4)	20.4 (68.7)	21.9 (71.4)	22.3 (72.1)	22.6 (72.7)	21.0 (69.8)
Record low °C (°F)	17.9 (64.2)	13.9 (57.0)	14.0 (57.2)	10.5 (50.9)	9.5 (49.1)	5.3 (41.5)	6.8 (44.2)	5.0 (41.0)	9.3 (48.7)	10.8 (51.4)	14.1 (57.4)	16.3 (61.3)	5.0 (41.0)
Average precipitation mm (inches)	282.8 (11.13)	265.8 (10.46)	235.4 (9.27)	132.2 (5.20)	65.7 (2.59)	20.7 (0.81)	18.7 (0.74)	29.8 (1.17)	72.2 (2.84)	135.6 (5.34)	194.7 (7.67)	264.3 (10.41)	1,717.9 (67.63)
Average precipitation days	14.9	14.5	13.3	9.0	5.2	2.3	1.7	1.8	4.1	8.1	10.4	13.5	98.8
Average relative humidity (%)	80.1	80.9	80.4	78.3	76.5	73.0	64.8	62.1	63.8	69.7	75.3	78.7	73.6
Source: Servicio Nacional de Meteorología e Hidrología de Bolivia

== Population ==
Over the past two decades, the town's population has risen by circa 30%, from 3,489 (census 1992) to 4,094 (census 2001) and 4,589 (2009 estimate). San Joaquin has been the site of a Machupo virus or Bolivian Hemorragic Fever outbreak in the 1960s.

== Notable people ==
- Jeanine Áñez, politician
