= Capitán Oriel Lea Plaza Airport =

Airport in Bolivia

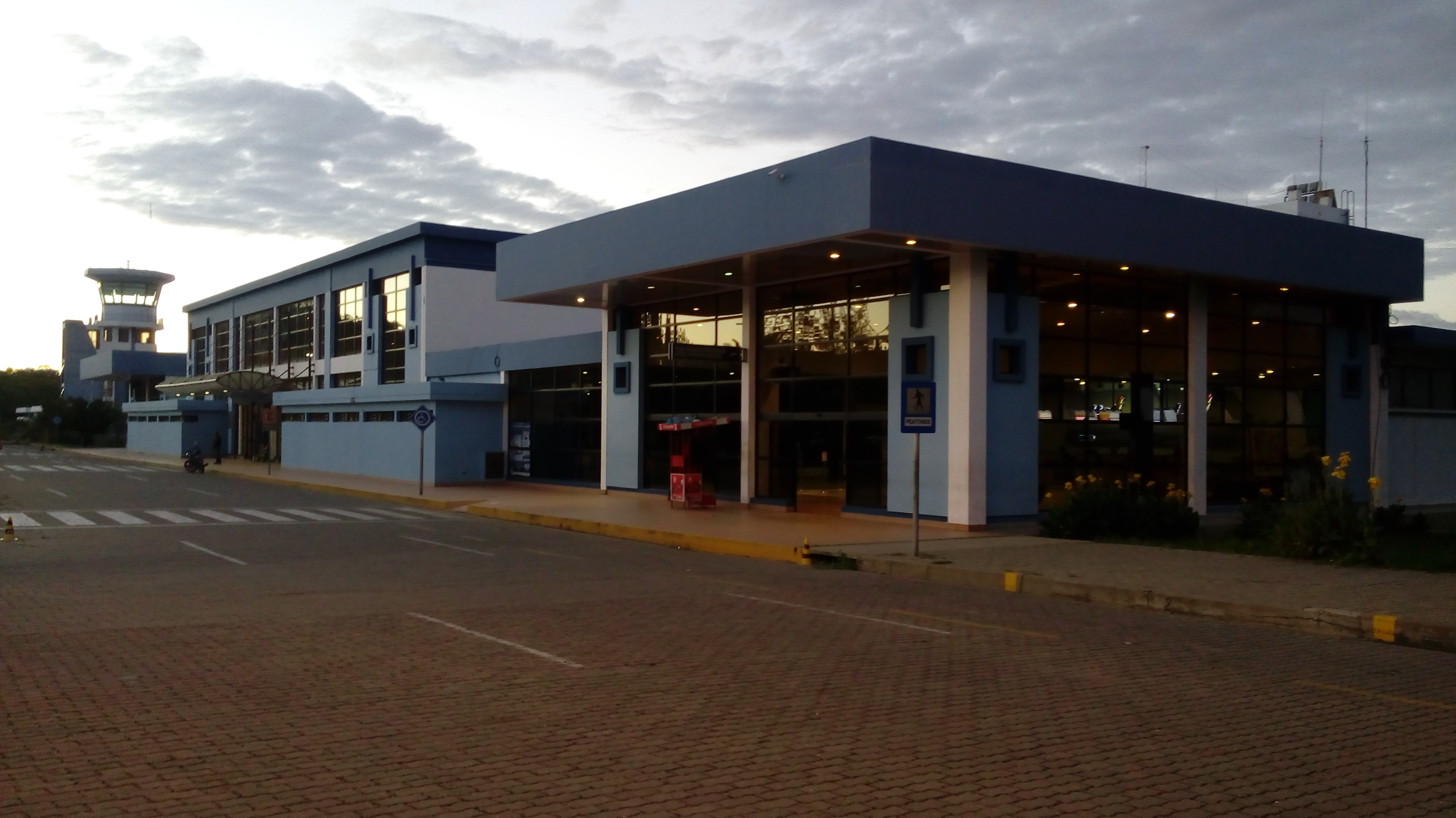
- IATA: TJA; ICAO: SLTJ

Summary
- Airport type: Civil/Military
- Operator: Navegación Aérea y Aeropuertos Bolivianos (NAABOL)
- Serves: Tarija, Bolivia
- Elevation AMSL: 6,084 ft / 1,854 m
- Coordinates: 21°33′20″S 64°42′05″W

Map
- Location of airport in Bolivia

Runways
Direction	Length		Surface
Direction	m	ft	Surface
13/31	3,050	10,007	Asphalt

Statistics (2023)
- Passengers: 339,735
- Sources: GCM

Capitán Oriel Lea Plaza Airport (IATA: TJA, ICAO: SLTJ) is an airport serving Tarija, the capital of the Tarija Department of Bolivia. The airport is in the southeastern section of the city, which is within a basin of the Cordillera Central mountain range. There is distant mountainous terrain in all quadrants.

== Airlines and destinations ==
Airlines	Destinations
Boliviana de Aviación	Cochabamba, La Paz, Santa Cruz de la Sierra–Viru Viru,

== See also ==
- Transport in Bolivia
- List of airports in Bolivia
