= San Joaquín Airport =

- IATA: SJB; ICAO: SLJO

Summary
- Airport type: Public
- Serves: San Joaquín, Bolivia
- Elevation AMSL: 476 ft / 145 m
- Coordinates: 13°04′00″S 64°40′30″W

Map
- Location of San Joaquín Airport in Bolivia

Runways
Direction	Length		Surface
Direction	m	ft	Surface
16/34	1,800	5,906	Grass
- Source: GCM Google Maps

San Joaquín Airport Spanish: Aeropuerto de San Joaquín, (IATA: SJB, ICAO: SLJO) is an airport 2 kilometres (1.2 mi) south of San Joaquín, a town in the Beni Department of Bolivia. The airport replaces an older one adjacent to the town.

The San Joaquin non-directional beacon (Ident: JOA) is located in town, near the old airstrip.

== See also ==
- Transport in Bolivia
- List of airports in Bolivia
