= Camiri Airport =

Airport in Bolivia

- IATA: CAM; ICAO: SLCA

Summary
- Airport type: Public
- Serves: Camiri, Bolivia
- Elevation AMSL: 2,598 ft / 792 m
- Coordinates: 20°00′25″S 63°31′40″W

Map
- Location of Camiri Airport in Bolivia

Runways
Direction	Length		Surface
Direction	m	ft	Surface
16/34	1,300	4,265	Grass
- Source: Landings.com Google Maps GCM

Camiri Airport Spanish: Aeropuerto Camiri, (IATA: CAM, ICAO: SLCA) is an airport serving Camiri, a city in the Santa Cruz Department of Bolivia.

The airport is just north of the city. Camiri is in a fold valley of the Cordillera Central mountain range, and there is nearby mountainous terrain east and west of the airport.

The Camiri non-directional beacon (Ident: CAM) is located on the field.

== See also ==
- Transport in Bolivia
- List of airports in Bolivia
