= Camiri =

- City
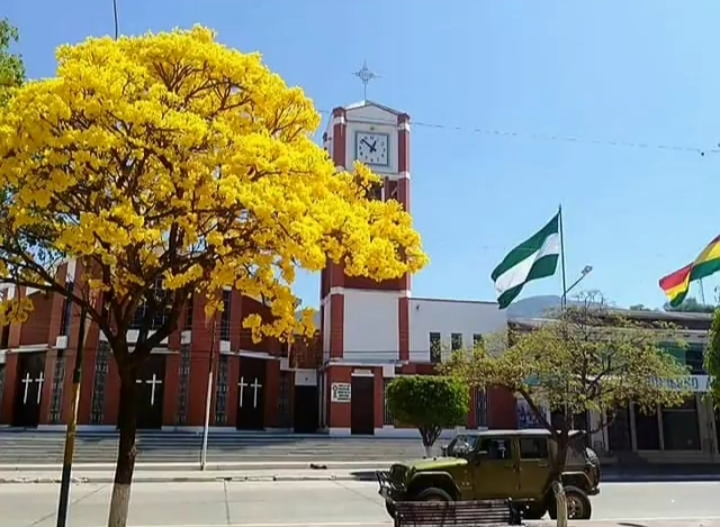
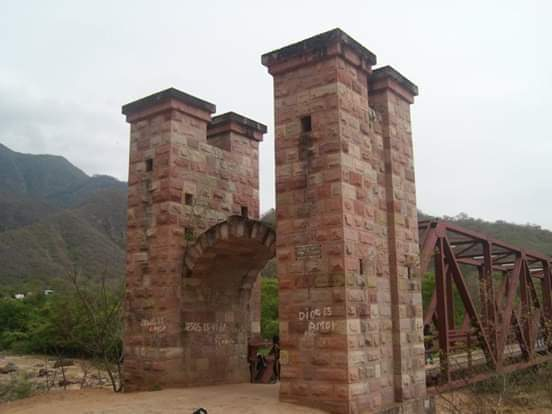
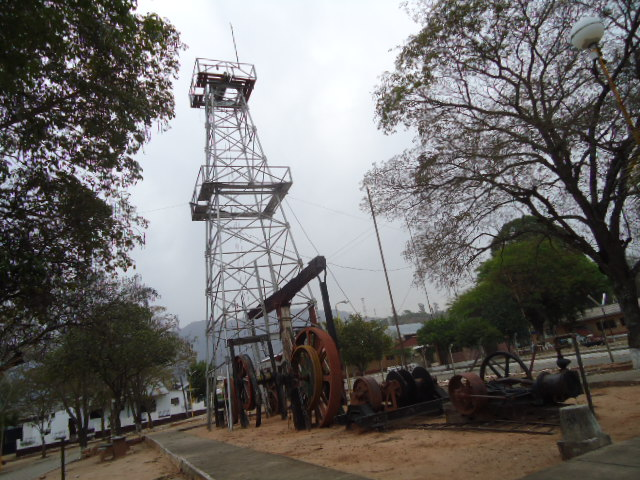
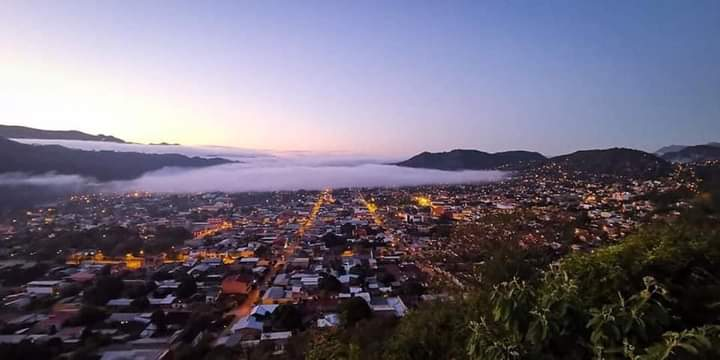
- Nickname: "Capital Petrolera de Bolivia"
- Location in Bolivia
- Coordinates: 20°6′0″S 63°32′0″W
- Country: Bolivia
- Department: Santa Cruz Department
- Province: Cordillera Province
- Municipality: Camiri Municipality

Area
  - Total: 22 km^{2} (8.5 sq mi)
  - Land: 19 km^{2} (7.3 sq mi)
  - Water: 3 km^{2} (1.2 sq mi)
- Elevation: 812 m (2,664 ft)

Population (2012)
  - Total: 35,712
  - Density: 1,900/km^{2} (4,900/sq mi)
- Time zone: UTC-4 (BOT)
- Area code: +591 3952
- Climate: Cwa
- Website: Official website

Camiri (Camirito, La Bomba, Choreti, Capital Petrolera de Bolivia) is a city in Bolivia, Santa Cruz Department, Cordillera Province. It is the seat of the Camiri Municipality. The town has an estimated population of 65,897 inhabitants, also known as "Camireños." Camiri is on the banks of the Parapeti River in a small valley surrounded by rolling hills on the east, north, and south, and by the Aguarague mountain range on the west.

Camiri's Chaco ecosystem encompasses subtropical dry forests with low canopy, and intense xerophilic overgrowth with a large diversity of wildlife.

On February 3, 2007, local protesters shut down a natural gas pipeline in Camiri that serves southern Bolivia. The protesters were seeking an expansion of the nationalization of the natural gas industry and a renewal of the promise of construction of facilities for YPFB, the national petroleum company.

== Climate ==
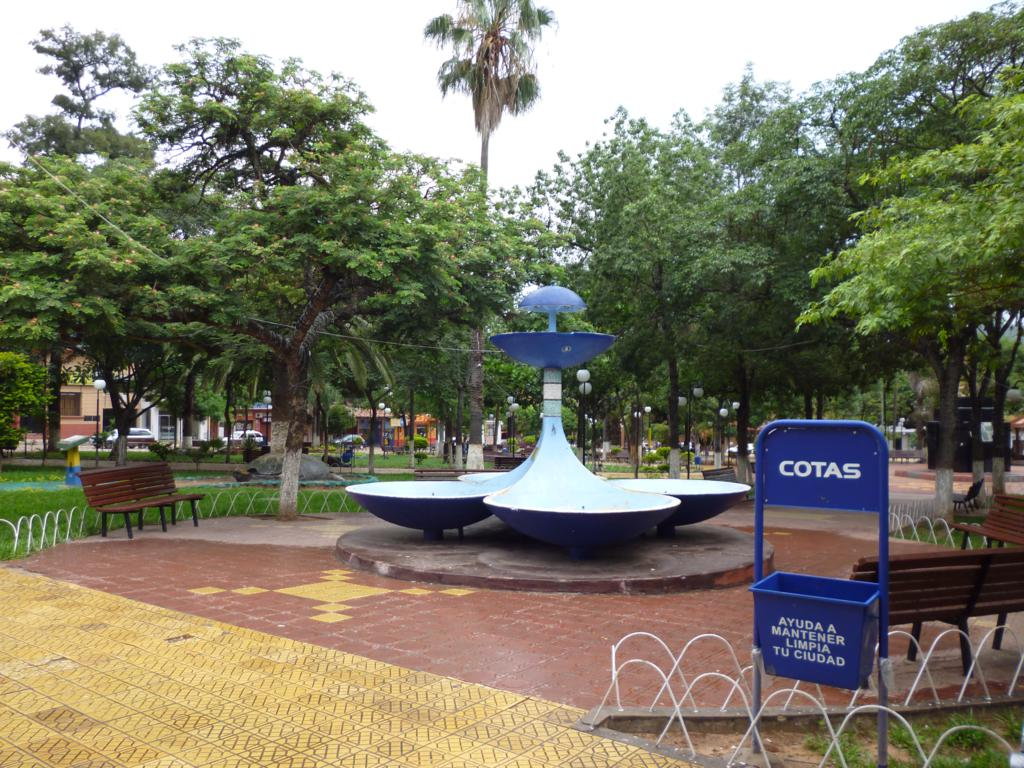
Central park

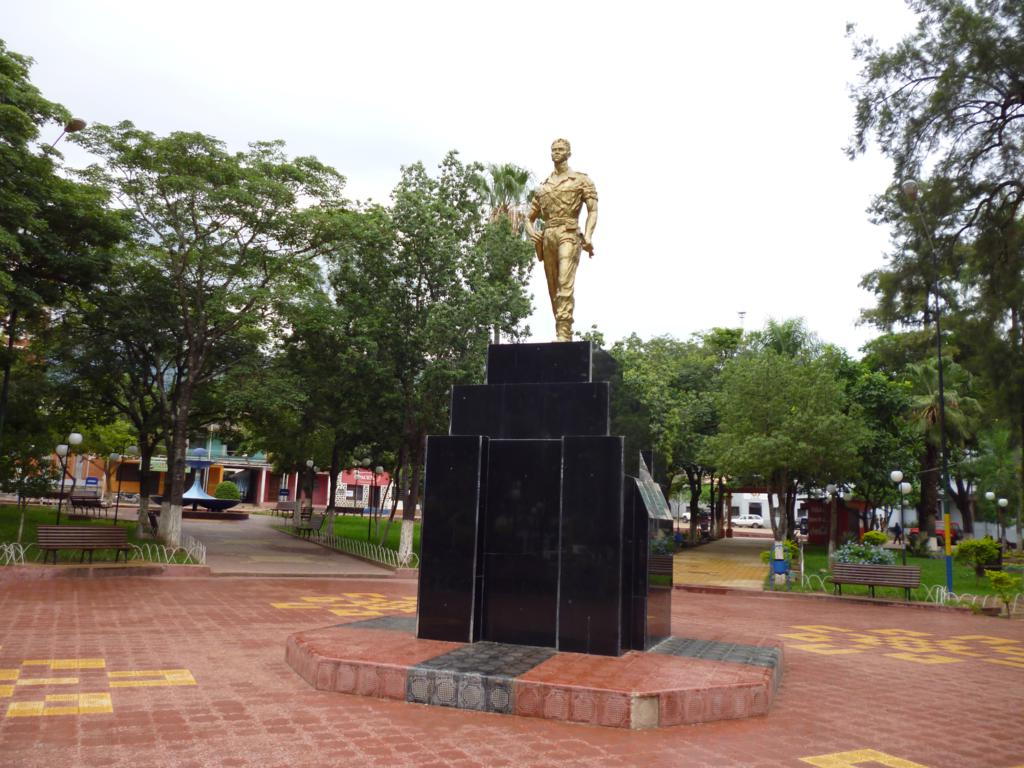
Statue in the Central park

Camiri has a humid subtropical climate (Köppen: Cwa).

Climate data for Camiri (Camiri Airport), elevation 810 m (2,660 ft)
Month	Jan	Feb	Mar	Apr	May	Jun	Jul	Aug	Sep	Oct	Nov	Dec	Year
Mean daily maximum °C (°F)	31.5 (88.7)	30.5 (86.9)	29.5 (85.1)	27.2 (81.0)	24.8 (76.6)	23.6 (74.5)	24.6 (76.3)	27.5 (81.5)	29.6 (85.3)	31.6 (88.9)	32.0 (89.6)	31.8 (89.2)	28.7 (83.6)
Daily mean °C (°F)	25.3 (77.5)	24.6 (76.3)	23.8 (74.8)	21.7 (71.1)	19.1 (66.4)	17.3 (63.1)	16.9 (62.4)	19.0 (66.2)	21.6 (70.9)	24.4 (75.9)	25.1 (77.2)	25.4 (77.7)	22.0 (71.6)
Mean daily minimum °C (°F)	19.0 (66.2)	18.8 (65.8)	18.1 (64.6)	16.1 (61.0)	13.4 (56.1)	10.9 (51.6)	9.2 (48.6)	10.4 (50.7)	13.4 (56.1)	17.1 (62.8)	18.2 (64.8)	19.0 (66.2)	15.3 (59.5)
Average precipitation mm (inches)	159.9 (6.30)	141.1 (5.56)	110.8 (4.36)	58.3 (2.30)	23.0 (0.91)	12.0 (0.47)	7.5 (0.30)	6.1 (0.24)	18.0 (0.71)	37.1 (1.46)	71.5 (2.81)	146.8 (5.78)	792.1 (31.2)
Average precipitation days	10.1	9.5	9.2	7.5	6.4	5.3	2.9	1.8	2.7	4.7	7.0	9.3	76.4
Average relative humidity (%)	71.0	72.8	74.9	76.3	76.3	72.6	64.5	54.7	51.4	56.3	59.8	66.9	66.5
Source: Servicio Nacional de Meteorología e Hidrología de Bolivia
