= Santa Ana del Yacuma Airport =

- IATA: SBL; ICAO: SLSA

Summary
- Airport type: Public
- Location: Santa Ana del Yacuma, Bolivia
- Elevation AMSL: 472 ft / 144 m
- Coordinates: 13°45′45″S 65°26′05″W

Map
- Location of airport in Bolivia

Runways
Direction	Length		Surface
Direction	m	ft	Surface
14/32	1,525	5,003	Asphalt
- Sources: GCM Google Maps

Santa Ana del Yacuma Airport (IATA: SBL, ICAO: SLSA) is an airport serving the town of Santa Ana del Yacuma in the Beni Department of Bolivia. The runway is just south of the town.

The Santa Ana non-directional beacon (Ident: ANA) is located on the field.

== Airlines and destinations ==
Airlines	Destinations

== See also ==
- Transport in Bolivia
- List of airports in Bolivia
