= Yuracaré language =

Indigenous language of Bolivia

Yuracaré
- Yurakaré, Yurakar, Yuracare, Yurucare, Yuracar, Yurakare, Yurujuré, Yurújare
- Yurújare
- Pronunciation: [juˈɹ̟uhaɹ̟e]
- Native to: Bolivia
- Region: Cochabamba Department
- Ethnicity: 3,394 Yuracaré people (2012) (INE Census)
- Native speakers: 900 (2025)
- Language family: Language isolate

Official status
- Official language in: Bolivia

Language codes
- ISO 639-3: yuz
- Glottolog: yura1255
- ELP: Yuracaré

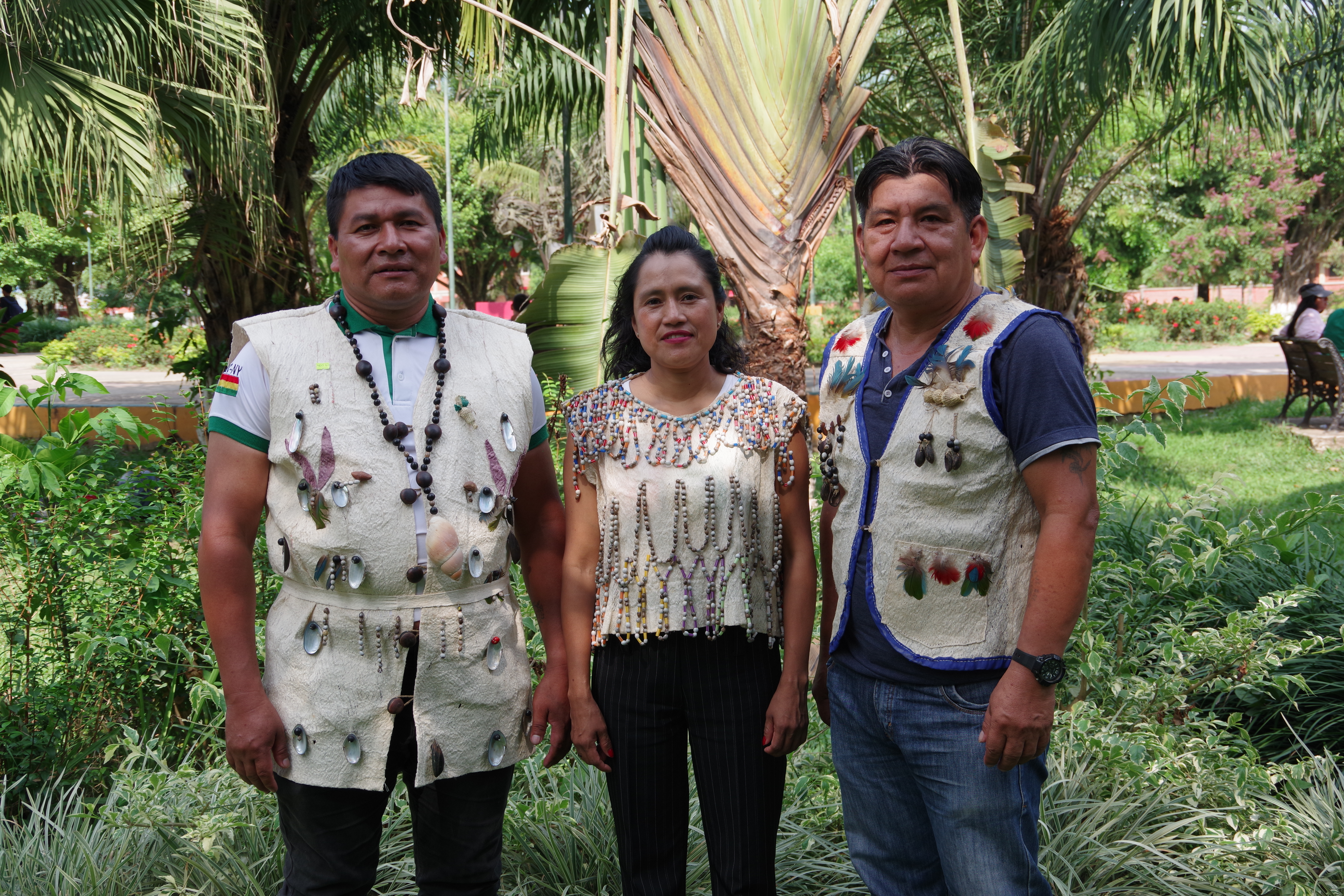
Members of the Yuracaré Nation Language and Culture Institute: German Maldonado, Daniel Chavez, and Mercy Noe wearing traditional Yuracaré clothing.

Yuracaré (also Yurakaré, Yurakar, Yuracare, Yurucare, Yuracar, Yurakare, Yurujuré, Yurújare) is an endangered language isolate of central Bolivia in Cochabamba and Beni departments spoken by the Yuracaré people.

Speakers refer to their own language as Yurújare [juˈɹ̟uhaɹ̟e].

== Distribution ==
There are 2,000–3,000 Yurakaré speakers in the upper Mamoré River valley of eastern Bolivia. They live along the Chapare and Ichilo Rivers in Cochabamba Department, as well as along the Isiboro and Sécure Rivers in Isiboro-Sécure National Park.

Loukotka (1968) reported that Yuracaré was spoken at the sources of the Sécure River, and on the Chapare River and Chimoré River.

== Classification ==
Suárez (1977) suggests a relationship between Yuracaré and the Mosetenan, Pano–Tacanan, Arawakan, and Chon families. His earlier Macro-Panoan proposal is the same minus Arawakan (Suárez 1969).

Jolkesky (2016) also notes that there are lexical similarities with the Moseten-Tsimane languages.

== Dialects ==
Two dialects, now extinct, were:

- Western - Mansiño, Oromo
- Eastern - Mage, Soloto

Coni, Cuchi, and Enete are possible dialects.

== Usage ==
There are approximately 2,500 speakers. These numbers are in decline as the youngest generation no longer learns the language. (See Language death.)

== Documentation ==
Yuracaré is documented with a grammar based on an old missionary manuscript by de la Cueva. The language is currently being studied by Rik van Gijn. A Foundation for Endangered Languages grant was awarded for a Yuracaré–Spanish / Spanish–Yuracaré dictionary project in 2005.

== Phonology ==
=== Consonants ===
		Labial	Alveolar	Palatal	Velar	Glottal
Plosive/ Affricate	voiceless	p	t	t͡ʃ	k	(ʔ)
Plosive/ Affricate	voiced	b	d	dʲ		
Fricative	voiceless		s	ʃ		h
Fricative	voiced		ɹ̝			
Nasal		m	n	ɲ		
Lateral			l			
Approximant		w		j		

- The glottal stop [ʔ] only occurs in intervocalic positions.
- /n/ may be pronounced as [ŋ] when preceding /k/.

=== Vowels ===
	Front	Central	Back
Close	i	ɨ	u
Mid	e		o
Open	æ	a	

- /ɨ/ may also be heard as a front-rounded [y], in free variation among speakers.
- Sounds /e, o, a/ may also be heard as [ɛ, ɔ, ɑ] when in closed syllables.

== Grammar ==
- Verb-initial
- agglutinating
- prefixes, suffixes
- reduplication

== Vocabulary ==
Loukotka (1968) lists the following basic vocabulary items.

gloss	Yuracare
one	letha
two	läshie
three	lívui
tooth	sansa
tongue	erume
hand	té-banau
woman	señe
water	záma
fire	áima
moon	shúhui
maize	sil
jaguar	samo
house	siba

== See also ==
- Yuracaré

== Bibliography ==
- Adam, Lucien (1893). Principes et dictionnaire de la langue Yuracaré ou Yurujuré composés par le R. P. de la Cueva et publiés conformément au manuscrit de A. d'Orbigny. Bibliothèque linguistique américaine (No. 16). Paris: Maisonneuve.
- Adelaar, Willem F. H.; & Muysken, Pieter C. (2004). The Languages of the Andes. Cambridge Language Surveys. Cambridge University Press.
- Campbell, Lyle. (1997). American Indian Languages: The Historical Linguistics of Native America. New York: Oxford University Press. ISBN 0-19-509427-1.
- Kaufman, Terrence. (1990). Language History in South America: What We Know and How To Know More. In D. L. Payne (Ed.), Amazonian Linguistics: Studies in Lowland South American languages (pp. 13–67). Austin: University of Texas Press. ISBN 0-292-70414-3.
- Kaufman, Terrence. (1994). The Native Languages of South America. In C. Mosley & R. E. Asher (Eds.), Atlas of the World's Languages (pp. 46–76). London: Routledge.
- Ribera, J.; Rivero, W.; Rocha, A. (1991). Vocabulario yuracaré-castellano, castellano-yuracaré. Trinidad: MISEREOR.
- Suárez, Jorge. (1969). Moseten and Pano–Tacanan. Anthropological Linguistics, 11 (9), 255-266.
- Suárez, Jorge. (1977). La posición lingüística del pano-tacana y del arahuaco. Anales de Antropología, 14, 243-255.
- van Gijn, Rik. (2004). Number in the Yurakaré Noun Phrase. In L. Cornips & J. Doetjes (Eds.), Linguistics in the Netherlands 2004 (pp. 69–79). Linguistics in the Netherlands (No. 21). John Benjamins.
- van Gijn, Rik (2005). Head Marking and Dependent Marking of Grammatical Relations in Yurakaré. In M. Amberber & H. de Hoop (eds.) Competition and Variation in Natural Languages: The Case for Case. (pp. 41–72) Elsevier.
- van Gijn, Rik (2006) A Grammar of Yurakaré. Ph.D. dissertation Radboud University Nijmegen. hdl:2066/41440
