= Chimoré =

Chimoré may refer to:

- Chimoré River, Bolivia
- Chimoré Municipality, Cochabamba, Bolivia
  - Chimoré, Cochabamba, the seat of the municipality
  - Chimore Airport
- Chimoré, Santa Cruz, Bolivia
