= Ichilo River =

Coordinates: 17°49′S 64°13′W

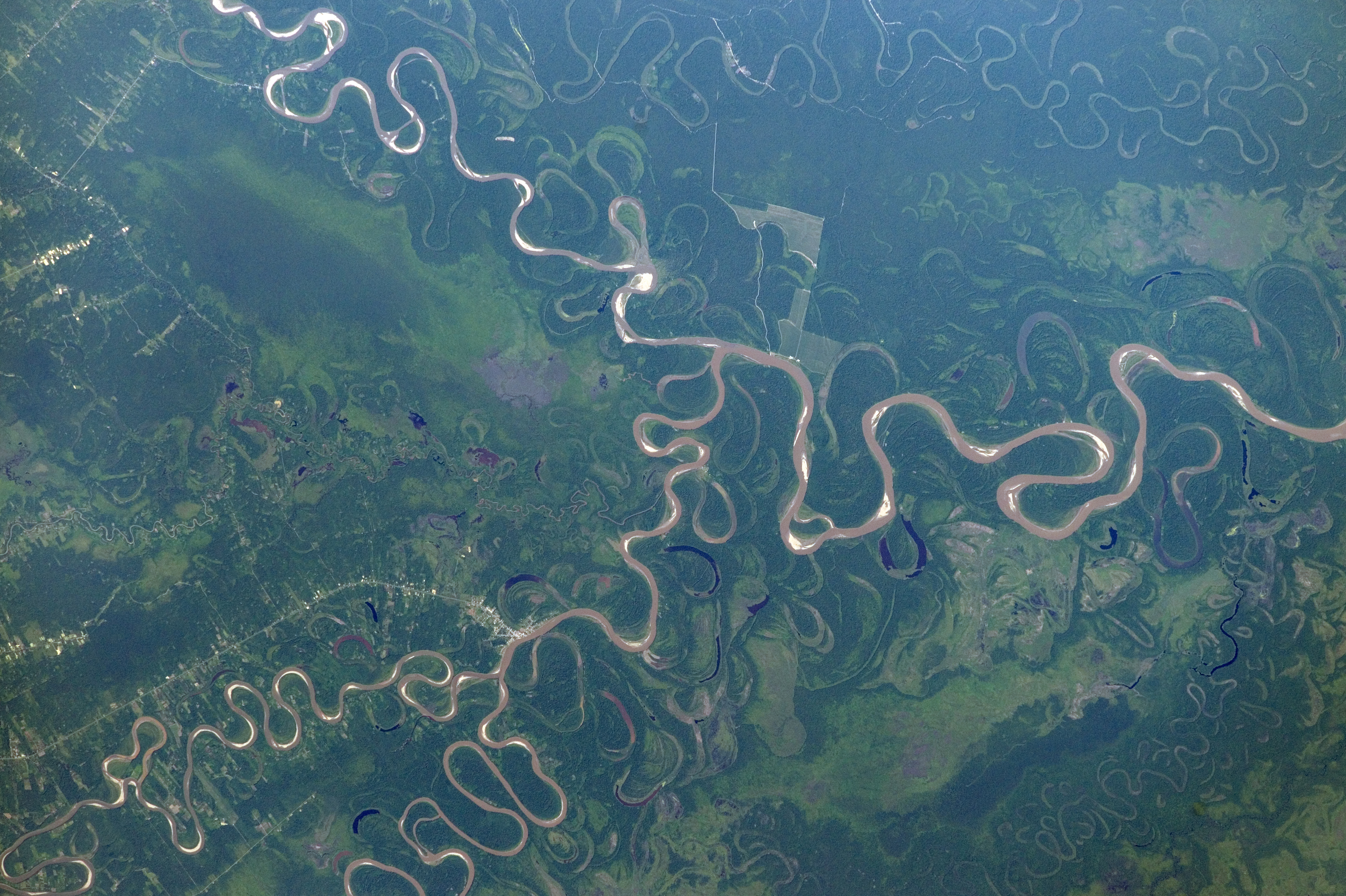
- Confluence of the Ivirgarzama River and the Ichilo River, and of the Chimoré River and the Ichilo River to the Mamoré River (north is to the upper right corner of this ISS image)

Location
- Country: Bolivia
- Region: Cochabamba Department, Santa Cruz Department

Physical characteristics
- Mouth: Mamoré River
- Length: 390 km (240 mi)

Ichilo River is a Bolivian river at the foot of the Eastern Andes-Cordillera in South America. It lends its name to the Ichilo Province, one of the 15 provinces of the Santa Cruz Department of Bolivia.

== Location ==
Ichilo River has its source in Manuel Maria Caballero Province in Santa Cruz Department at an elevation of 2,437 m at the foothills of the Racete range, where it is named Alto Ichilo (Upper Ichilo).

In its course, after joining San Matéo, it is called Ichilo, flowing in a northerly direction, where it forms the border between the Cochabamba Department and the Santa Cruz Department.

== Flow Conditions ==
From its source to the mouth into the Amazon, the river has a total length of 2,455 km. The Ichilo itself has a length of 632 km and a catchment area of 15,660 km². It maximum depth is 18.6 m, right below Puerto Villarroel at km 100. Its maximum width is 420 m at km 75. The Ichilo is one of the Bolivian rivers with a high amount of water.

== Tributaries ==
The most important tributaries of the Ichilo are the Bolivian Río Grande, Chapare, Piraí, Sacta, Víbora, Chimoré, Choré, Ibaresito, Ibabo and Useuta rivers.

== Urban Areas ==
Ichilo River passes the metropolitan area of Santa Cruz in the west, the largest cities on the riverbanks is Puerto Villaroel.
