= Yuracaré =

Yuracaré may refer to:

- Yuracaré people, an ethnic group of Bolivia
- Yuracaré language, their language
