= Chimoré Municipality =

- Municipality
- Flag

- Location within Bolivia
- Coordinates: 16°35′S 64°55′W
- Country: Bolivia
- Department: Cochabamba Department
- Province: Carrasco Province
- Seat: Chimoré

Government
  - Mayor: Humberto Guardia Quinteros (2007)
  - President: Rafael Guzmán Zelada (2007)
- Elevation: 720 ft (220 m)

Population (2001)
  - Total: 15,264
  - Ethnicities: Quechua Yuracaré
- Time zone: UTC-4 (BOT)

Chimoré Municipality is the fourth municipal section of the Carrasco Province in the Cochabamba Department, Bolivia. Its seat is Chimoré.

This municipality was created in 1984 by Law number 633 of September 13, 1984, encompassing the towns of San Isidro, Senda III, La Victoria, Santa Rosa, Todos Santos, Puerto Alegre, Entre Rios Tacuaral, Puerto Aurora, Senda F, Senda D, Senda B y Cesarzama.

It is bordered by the rivers Ichilo, Chimoré and Chapare.

== Subdivision ==
The municipality consists of only one canton, Chimoré Canton. It is identical to the municipality.

== The people ==
The people are predominantly indigenous citizens of Quechuan descent. There are also groups of Yuracaré along Chapare River like in the communities of Ibare, Puerto Cochabamba and Nueva Esperanza.

Ethnic group	%
Quechua	67.6
Aymara	5.1
Guaraní, Chiquitos, Moxos	2.0
Not indigenous	20.1
Other indigenous groups	5.1

== Languages ==
The languages spoken in the municipality are mainly Spanish and Quechua.

Language	Inhabitants
Quechua	9,596
Aymara	965
Guaraní	19
Another native	424
Spanish	11,530
Foreign	128
Only native	2,518
Native and Spanish	7,811
Only Spanish	3,726
