= Yacuma =

Yacuma may refer to:

- Yacuma River - River in Bolivia
- Yacuma Province - Bolivia province
- Yakuma - Mountain peak in Bolivia near La Paz
