= Yacuma River =

Río Yacuma
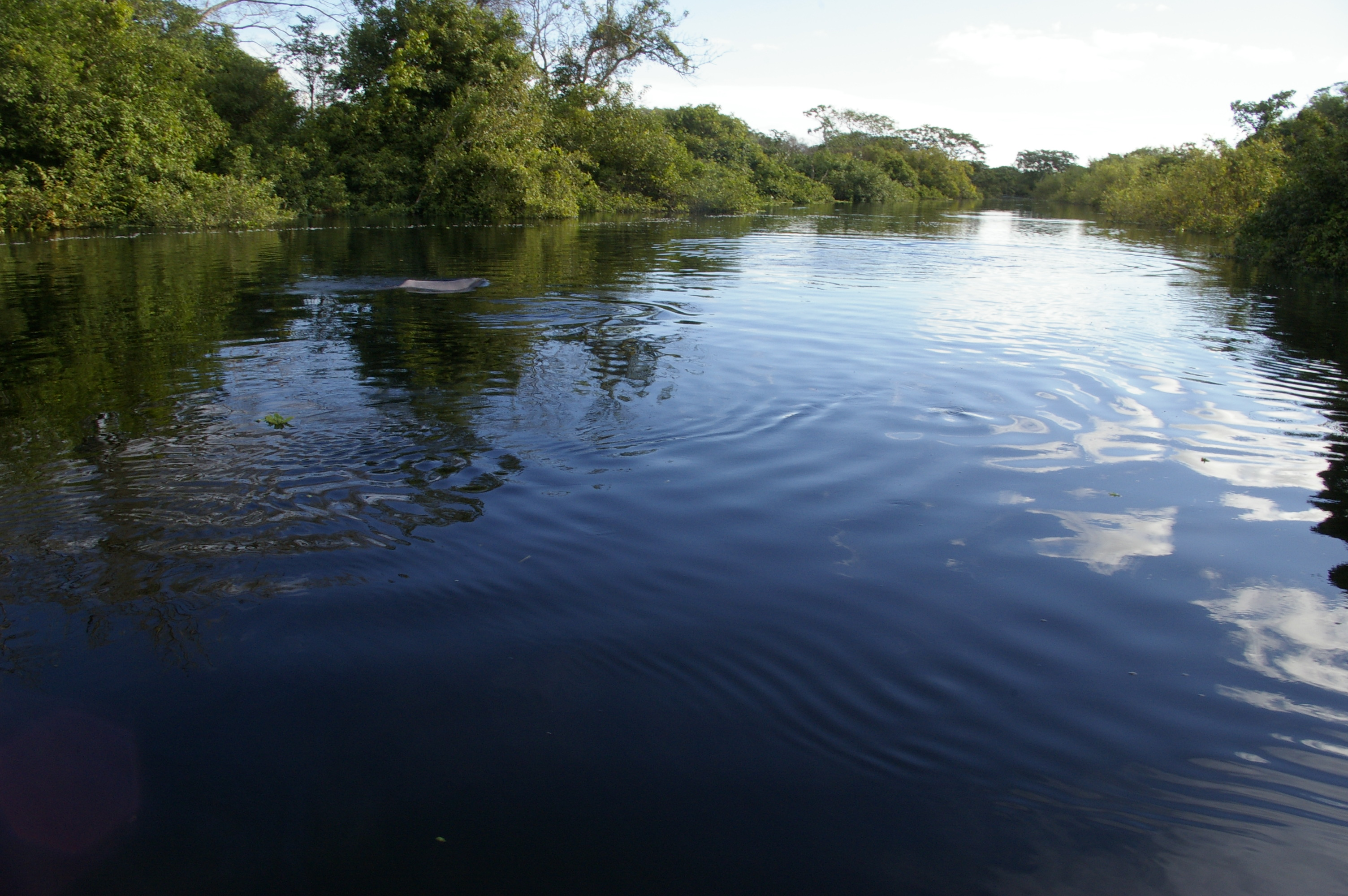
- Yacuma River with Amazon river dolphins

Location
- Location: Bolivia

Physical characteristics
- Source
  - location: source region: north-east of the town of Yucumo
  - coordinates: 14°51′20″S 66°54′41″W
  - elevation: 205 metres (673 ft)
- Mouth
  - location: Mamoré River
  - coordinates: 13°39′28″S 65°19′58″W
  - elevation: 144 metres (472 ft)
- Length: 570 kilometres (350 mi)

Basin features
- Progression: Mamoré River → Madeira River → Amazon River → Atlantic Ocean
- River system: Amazon
- Landmarks: Large towns: Santa Ana del Yacuma; Small towns: San Borja, Bolivia
- Tributaries
  - left: Río Bio
  - right: Río Rapulo, Río Chaparini, Río Caripo

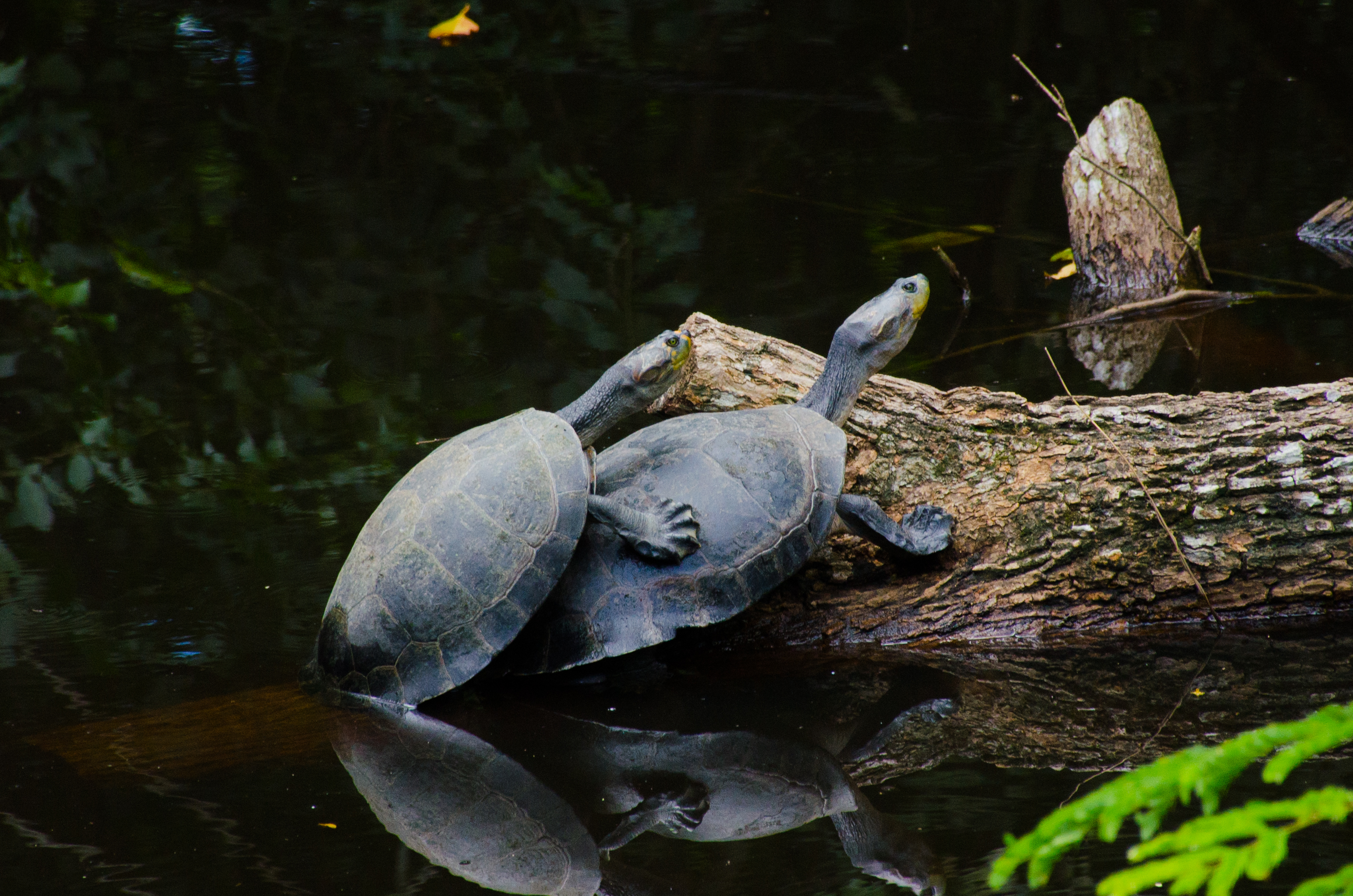
tortoises in the Yacuma River

The Yacuma River is a river in Bolivia, which feeds into the Mamoré River and ultimately into the Amazon. The headwaters of the Yacuma are within the Pilón Lajas Biosphere Reserve and Communal Lands.

Rio Yacuma starts about 30 kilometres (19 mi) east of Rurrenabaque. The upper parts are accessible through Reyes.
