= Senda F =

- Locality
- Location in Bolivia
- Coordinates: 16°52′S 65°07′W
- Country: Bolivia
- Department: Cochabamba
- Province: Carrasco
- Municipality: Chimoré
- Canton: Senda F Canton
- Founded: August 1, 1960

Government
  - Civic Committee: Carlos Garcia
- Elevation: 660 ft (200 m)

Population (2012)
  - Total: 1,500
- Time zone: UTC-4 (BOT)
- Area code: +591
- Climate: Af

Senda F is a Bolivian town belonging to the municipality of Chimoré, located in the Carrasco Province of the Department of Cochabamba.

== Geography ==
Senda F is located in the North Department of Cochabamba in 16°52′28″S 65°7′54″W (16.874372, -65.132312). It is bordered to the south by the Arroyo Negro river. The town of Chimoré is 9.9 miles (15.9 km) to the southwest.

According to the Bolivia Census , Senda F has a total area of 0.97 square miles (2.5 km^{2}), of which 0.89 square miles (2.3 km^{2}) is land and 0.08 square miles (0.2 km^{2}) (6.31%) is water.

== Demographics ==
Historical population
Census	Pop.	Note	%±
1990	525		—
2000	890		69.5%
2010	1,052		18.2%
2020	1,340		27.4%
2022 (est.)	1,600		19.4%

=== 2012 census ===
Senda F racial composition
Race	Number	Percentage
Quechua	1155	77.6%
Aimara	225	15.1%
Other/Mixed	60	4.30%
Not indigenous	45	3.70%

As of the 2012 Bolivian census, there were 1500 people, 171 households, and 154 families residing in the town.
