= Pilón Lajas Biosphere Reserve and Communal Lands =

Protected area in Bolivia

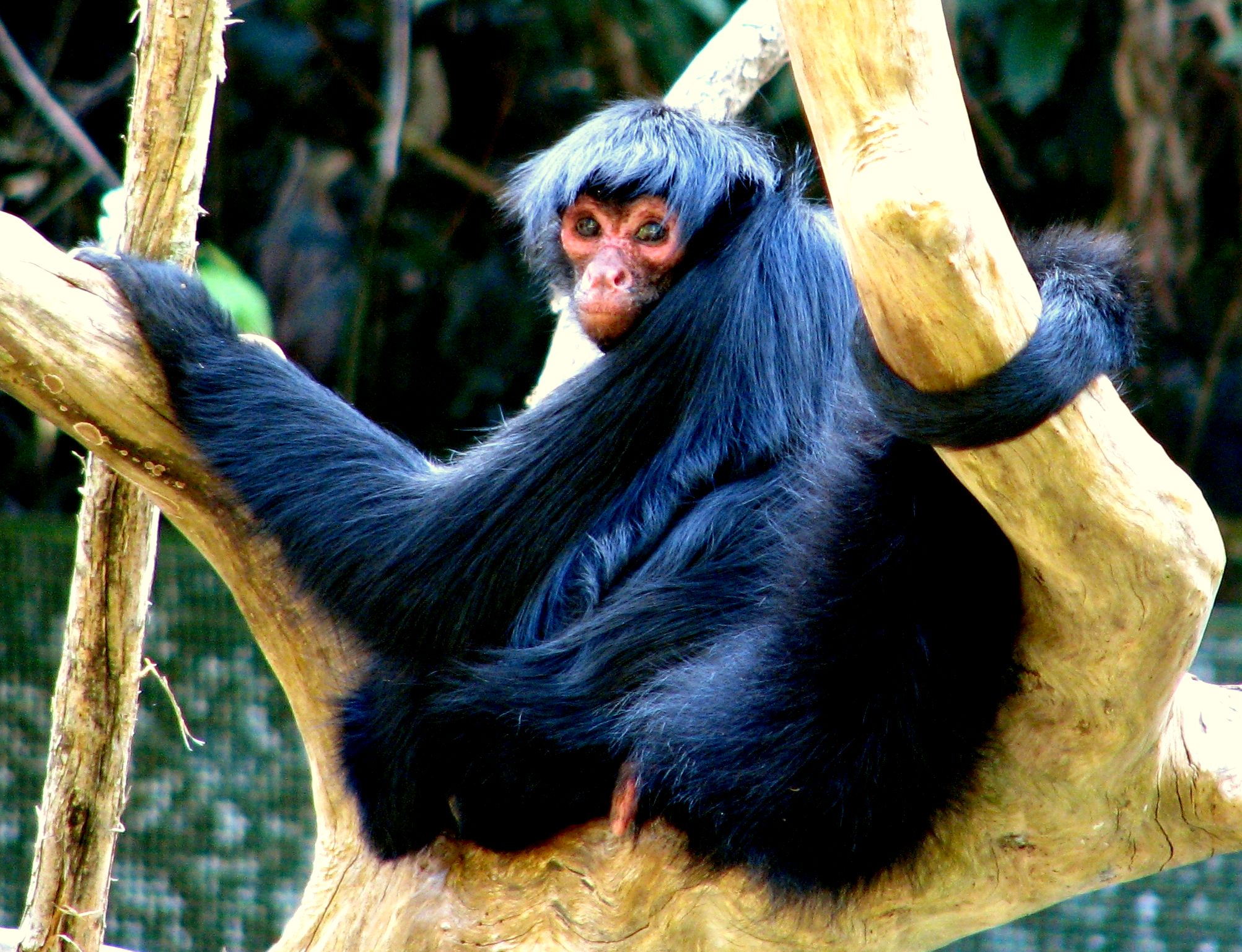
- Red-faced spider monkey
- Interactive map of Pilón Lajas Biosphere Reserve and Communal Lands
- Location: Bolivia; Beni Department, La Paz Department,
- Nearest city: San Borja (50 km)
- Coordinates: 14°56′S 67°25′W
- Area: 400.000 ha (988.42 acres)
- Established: 1992

Pilón Lajas Biosphere Reserve and Communal Lands (Reserva de Biosfera y Tierra Comunitaria de Origen Pilón Lajas) is a protected area in Bolivia located in the departments of La Paz (Sud Yungas, Larecaja and Franz Tamayo provinces) and Beni (José Ballivián Province), in their northern and western parts, respectively, about 350 km northeast of La Paz and 50 km west of San Borja. It lies largely within the Bolivian Yungas ecoregion. The main river that flows in the Pilon Lajas area is the Quiquibey River.

As of 2004, the indigenous population of Pilón Lajas was 1,394, distributed across 25 communities. Predominantly these residents are members of the Mosetén, Tsimané, and Tacana peoples, but they also include intermarried Quechuas, Aymaras, Lecos and Yuracarés.

== Establishment ==
Pilón Lajas was declared a biosphere reserve by UNESCO in 1977. The Bolivian government designated it an indigenous territory and biosphere reserve through Supreme Decree 23110, issued in 1992. The multiethnic Tsimané Moseten Regional Council (Spanish: Consejo Regional Tsimane Moseten; CRTM) was formed in 1992 and received the title to the reserve as a Native Community Land or TCO in 1997.
