= Expeditionary Task Force =

The Expeditionary Task Force (ETF; Spanish: Fuerza de Tarea Expedicionaria, FTE) was an armed unit of former Bolivian soldiers engaged in counternarcotics activity and management of protests by the coca growers' movement in the Chapare region of Bolivia from early 2001 to July 2002. The unit was based at three bases near Chimoré (in Carrasco Province, Cochabamba) consisted of as many as 1,500 troops commanded by officers of the Bolivian Army.

The Expeditionary Task Force was commanded by Col. Aurelio Burgos Blacutt. The United States government paid the salaries of members of the unit, under the auspices of the Narcotics Affairs Section of the US Embassy in La Paz. The units expenses amounted to $200,000 per month in mid-2002, and was funded by the Bureau for International Narcotics and Law Enforcement Affairs, as part of US antinarcotics foreign aid. Troops were paid 600 Bolivianos or $100 per month, around 40% more than enlisted soldiers. The US Embassy vetted the leaders and members of the unit.

The Bolivian Armed Forces command described the troops' status as reservists. According to the US Department of State they were "military force composed of conscripts who had completed their obligatory service … commanded by active duty military officers." Due to this unusual arrangement, Bolivian Human Rights Ombudsman Ana María Romero called the troops "sicarios" (hired killers) and Juan Ramón Quintana, then director of the Defense Ministry's Defense Policy Analysis Unit, argued, "The existence of this force is a violation of the Bolivian constitution and our military law, which does not permit the creation, by the government or anyone else, of armed groups such as the expeditionary force."

Task Force soldiers were involved in the shooting deaths of coca grower's union leader Casimiro Huanca on December 6, 2001, and protester Marcos Ortiz Llanos on January 29, 2002.

The force was withdrawn from the Chapare at the end of July 2002 and disbanded.
