= San Borja Municipality =

San Borja
- Municipality
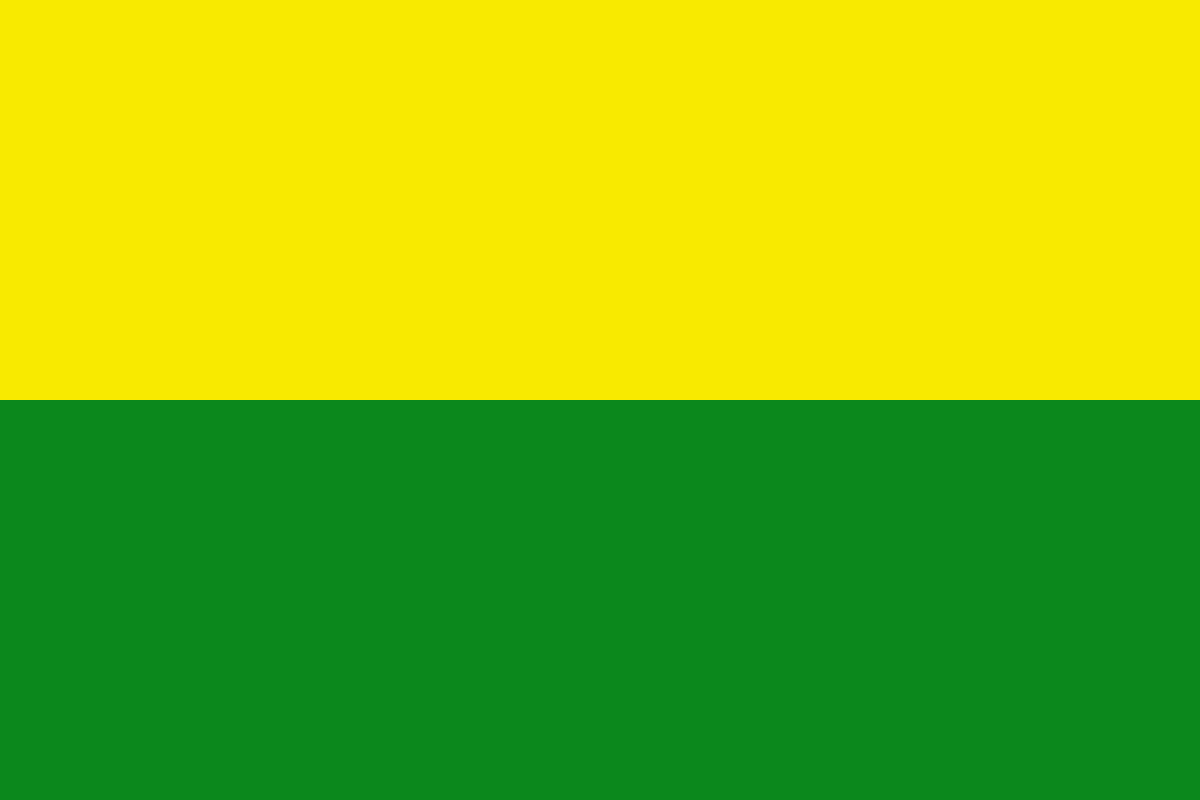
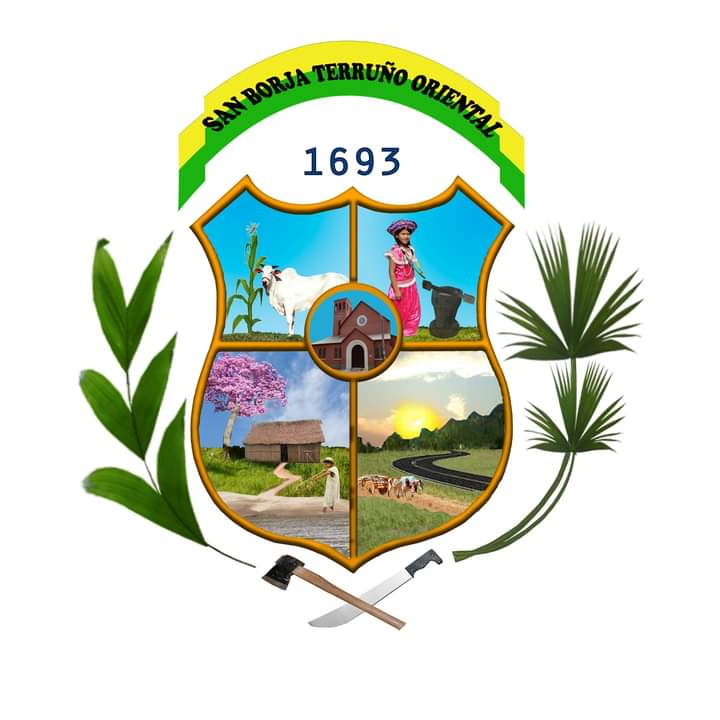
- Flag Coat of arms

- Location of San Rafael within Bolivia
- Coordinates: 14°40′0″S 66°50′0″W
- Country: Bolivia
- Department: Beni
- Province: José Ballivián
- Seat: San Borja

Government
  - Mayor: Walter Ronald Tovías Simond (2008)
  - President: Sagir Dayer Asbun (2008)

Area
  - Total: 5,150 sq mi (13,350 km^{2})
- Elevation: 660 ft (200 m)

Population (2001)
  - Total: 34,363
  - Density: 6.667/sq mi (2.574/km^{2})
- Time zone: UTC-4 (BOT)

San Borja is the second municipal section of the José Ballivián Province in the Beni Department of Bolivia. The seat of the municipality is the town of San Borja.

== Languages ==
The languages spoken in the San Borja Municipality are mainly Spanish, Chimane, Aymara and Quechua.

Language	Inhabitants
Quechua	1,840
Aymara	2,196
Guaraní	29
Another native	5,890
Spanish	27,547
Foreign	270
Only native	4,219
Native and Spanish	5,325
Only Spanish	22,233
