= Ibabo River =

Coordinates: 18°S 64°W

Location
- Country: Bolivia

Ibabo is a river in central Bolivia. It is a tributary of the Ichilo River.
