= Chimoré Airport =

Airport in Bolivia

- IATA: CCA; ICAO: SLHI

Summary
- Airport type: Public
- Serves: Chimoré, Bolivia
- Elevation AMSL: 875 ft / 267 m
- Coordinates: 16°59′20″S 65°08′30″W

Map
- Location of Chimoré Airport in Bolivia

Runways
Direction	Length		Surface
Direction	m	ft	Surface
17/35	4,000	13,123	Asphalt
- Source: Landings.com Google Maps GCM

Chimoré Airport (Spanish: Aeropuerto Chimoré, (IATA: CCA, ICAO: SLHI)) is an airport serving Chimoré, a town in the Cochabamba Department of Bolivia.

The airport is beside a bend in the Chimoré River. The runway length includes a 895 metres (2,936 ft) displaced threshold on Runway 35.

The airport was constructed at a cost of US$40 million to the tax payer.

== See also ==
- Transport in Bolivia
- List of airports in Bolivia
