= Isiboro Sécure National Park and Indigenous Territory =

National park in Bolivia

- IUCN category II (national park)
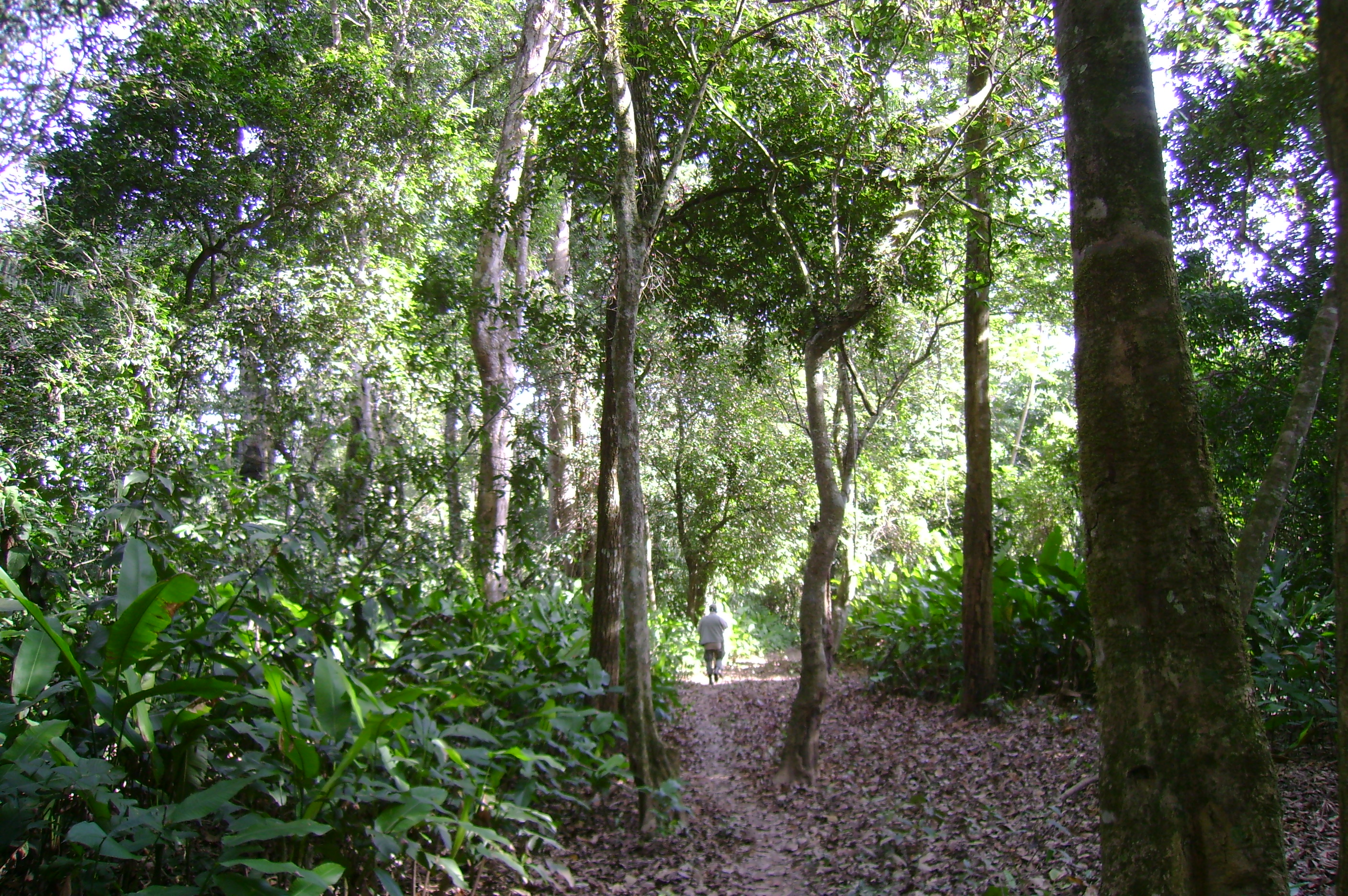
- A man walks through the Isiboro Sécure park near the Sécure River

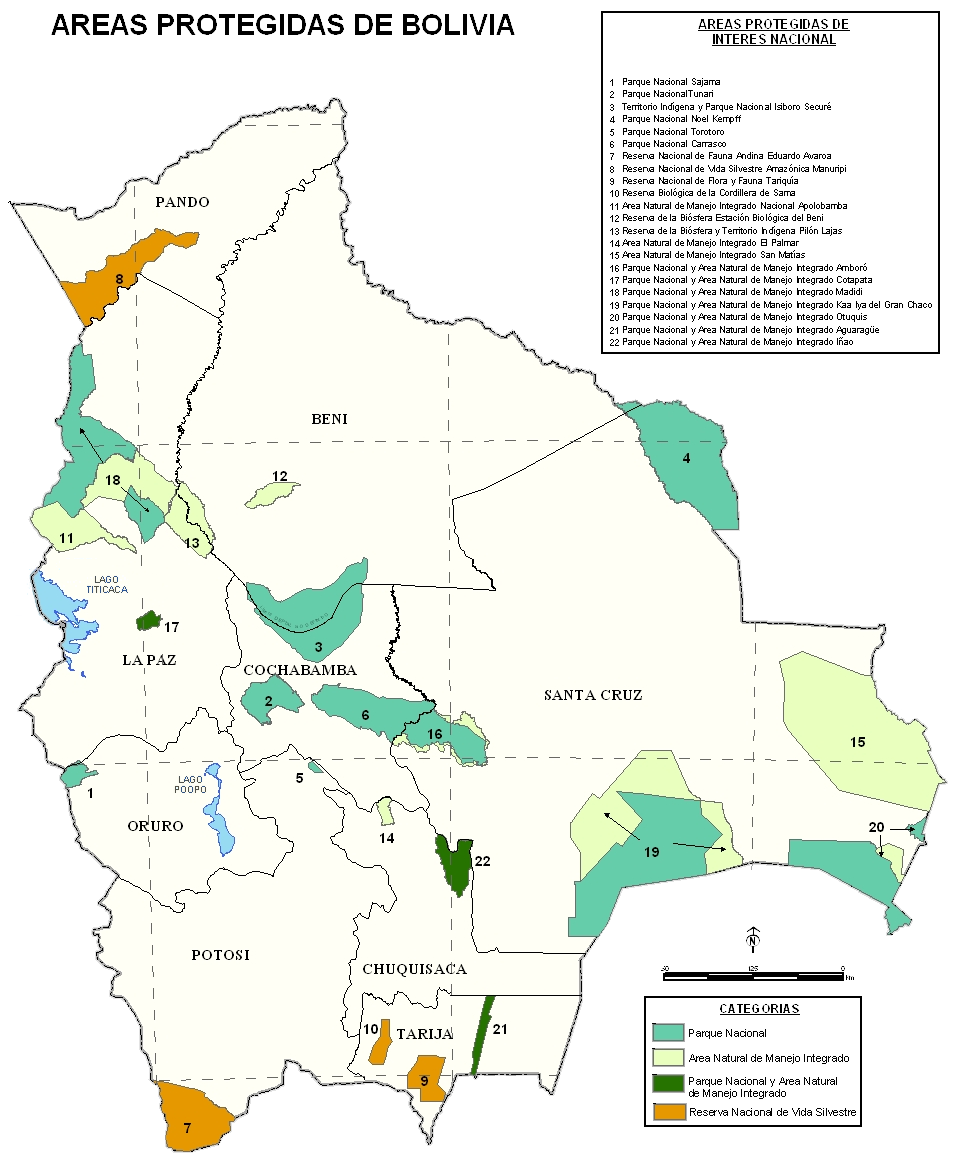
- Isiboro Sécure is Protected Area 3 on this map.
- Location: Bolivia; Beni Department, Cochabamba Department
- Nearest city: Villa Tunari and San Ignacio de Moxos
- Coordinates: 16°0′0″S 66°0′0″W
- Area: 1,372,180 ha (3,390,700 acres)
- Established: November 22, 1965; Recognized as indigenous territory, September 24, 1990
- Governing body: Servicio Nacional de Áreas Protegidas (SERNAP)

Isiboro Sécure National Park and Indigenous Territory (Territorio Indígena y Parque Nacional Isiboro Secure, TIPNIS) is a protected area and Native Community Land in Bolivia situated between the north of the Cochabamba Department and the south of the Beni Department (Chapare, Moxos, and Marbán provinces). It protects part of the Bolivian Yungas ecoregion. The indigenous people living within the park belong to the Tsimané, Yuracaré, and Mojeño-Trinitario peoples. The southern portion of the park has been colonized by agricultural settlers, primarily coca farmers, since the 1970s. The Bolivian government estimates that 10% of the park has been deforested by their presence.

== Establishment ==
The park was made into a National Park by Supreme Decree 7401 on November 22, 1965 and recognized as an indigenous territory (formally as Native Community Land) through Supreme Decree 22610 on September 24, 1990, following pressure by local native peoples and the March for Territory and Dignity organized by the Confederation of Indigenous Peoples of the Bolivian East. Indigenous residents had organized the Subcentral Indígena del TIPNIS (Subcentral TIPNIS) in July 1988. Following clearing by the National Agrarian Reform Institute (INRA), operative collective title to the Isiboro Securé TCO, consisting of 1,091,656 hectares was awarded to the Subcentral TIPNIS on 13 June 2009. Some 124,000 hectares inside the park were adjudicated to agrarian colonists, most in the southern Polygon 7. Another 137,783 hectares are held by ranchers in the Beni department portion of the park.

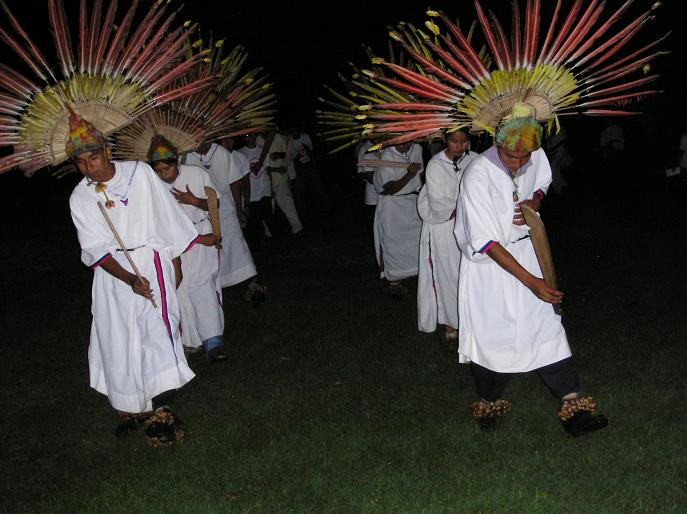
Macheteros, a typical dance of Beni, performed by local Moxos people in Isiboro Sécure National Park, 2004

== Ecology ==
The territory includes four major ecosystems:

- Flooded savannas of the Moxos plain or llano, which are characterized by varied relief and are similar to the llanos of Colombia and the Pantanal in southeast Bolivia
- Sub-Andean Amazonian forest
- Pre-Andean Amazonian forest
- Bolivian-Peruvian Yungas

== Wildlife ==
(undescribed species not included)

- Mammals: 218 species
- Birds: 992 species
- Amphibians: 157 species
- Reptiles: 131 species

== Population ==
TIPNIS is home to three indigenous peoples who have ancestrally lived in the region. At the 2001 census, there were 12,388 indigenous inhabitants, living in 64 communities: 1.809 from the Yuracaré people; 4,228 of the Trinitario-Mojeño people; and 6,351 of the Chimane people.

In the colonized zone of the south, there are some 20 thousand families belonging to 52 agrarian unions, which are organized into 8 centrales (or union federations). These unions are members of the Federation of the Tropic of Cochabamba (Federación del Trópico de Cochabamba), itself one of the Six Federations, the Chapare coca growers' union organization.

== Geography ==
=== River basin ===
The area is part of the Mamoré River drainage, portion of the Amazon Basin. The Sécure River is one of the principal tributaries of the Mamoré and the Isiboro River itself flows into the Sécure. Both the Sécure and Isiboro flow through TIPNIS, and are located in the north and south of the park, respectively. The Ichoa River, a tributary of the Isiboro, flows through the central part of the park and receives water from various smaller streams. The Sécure and Isiboro drainages correspond the Yungas Mountainous Humid Forest and Madeira Humid Forest bioregions.

The Isiboro, Sécure, and Ichoa rivers are the principal axes of transportation in the region, through which visitors reach the attractions of the park. They make up part of the landscape observed by visitors as well as the route for navigation. The rivers also are home to much of the fauna of the park, particularly the pink river dolphins.

=== Laguna Bolivia ===
The Laguna Bolivia is a major site for observing wildlife. It is accessed by water, entering through the Black arroyo from the Sécure river during high water season, or by land on foot or horse from the communities of Dulce Nombre or Limoncito. The water route lacks a formal port from which tourists may embark. The land route is by way of the road through the southern colonized area of TIPNIS from Isinuta to Aroma.

== Environmental threats ==
=== Deforestation ===
TIPNIS has experienced substantial deforestation, particularly in the region of the park outside the red line, known as Polygon 7, where agricultural colonization has taken place since the 1970s. Continuing colonization is expected to remove 43% of the forest cover in TIPNIS by 2030.

=== Planned highway ===
The park was slated as the site of the Segment Two (of three) of the proposed Villa Tunari–San Ignacio de Moxos Highway, which would provide the first direct highway link between Cochabamba and Beni Departments. While the highway has been discussed for decades, a $332 million loan from Brazil's National Bank for Economic and Social Development (BNDES), approved by Bolivia in 2011, will make construction possible. The project has an expected overall cost of $415 million and extends 306 kilometers, divided into three segments: Segment I from Villa Tunari to Isinuta (47 km), Segment II from Isinuta to Monte Grande (177 km), and Segment III from Monte Grande to San Ignacio de Moxos (82 km). In May 2010, the a meeting of TIPNIS Subcentral and corregidores throughout the territory stated their "overwhelming and unrenounceable opposition" to the project. In June 2011, President Evo Morales inaugurated the project with a ceremony at Villa Tunari. However, neither a final design nor environmental approval have been completed for Segment Two. In July 2011, the Subcentral, the Confederation of Indigenous Peoples of Bolivia, and the highland indigenous confederation CONAMAQ announced they would participate in a national march from Villa Tunari to La Paz opposing the project.

A major concern about the impact of the road is its contribution to deforestion: "Empirical evidence has shown that highways are motors for deforestation" concluded a study of the project by the Program for Strategic Investigation in Bolivia (PIEB). The study projected that the road would markedly accelerate deforestation in the park, leaving up to 64% of TIPNIS deforested by 2030. A technical report submitted by the Bolivian Highway Administration (ABC) established that the direct deforestation caused by the road itself would only be 0.03%; similarly, President Morales has spoken of a 180-hectare deforestation, an area equivalent to a rectangle 180 km long and 10 m wide. Morales government officials claim 49 of the 64 communities of TIPNIS are now in favor of the construction of the road.

The Subcentral, the Confederation of Indigenous Peoples of Bolivia (CIDOB), and the highland indigenous confederation CONAMAQ carried out a national march from Trinidad, Beni to La Paz in opposition to the project, beginning on August 15, 2011. On September 25, a police raid on the march resulted in the detention of hundreds of marchers, who were later released. The march regrouped and arrived in La Paz on October 19 to a massive public welcome. During the march, other movements such as the Cochabamba campesino confederation and the colonos union in Yucumo mobilized in favor of the project. In early October, the Plurinational Legislative Assembly passed legislation authored by the MAS authorizing the road following a consultation process, but indigenous deputies and the indigenous movement opposed the bill. At the opening of negotiations with the protesters on October 21, Morales announced that he would veto the legislation and support the text proposed by the indigenous deputies. This text was passed by the Assembly and signed into law on October 24. Law 180 of 2011 declares TIPNIS an intangible zone and prohibits the construction of highways that cross it. However, in February 2012, the government retracted from agreements with indigenous marchers and enacted Law 222, authorizing and designing a consultation process to be carried out in the TIPNIS about the highway. The consultation process was carried out despite renewed indigenous mobilizations against it (the Ninth Indigenous March was not received by the government for negotiations and was subject to police repression in their camping site in La Paz). Human rights observers who audited the consultation have denounced considerable irregularities before, during, and after the consultation including late notifications, lack of information provided to indigenous communities, meetings outside of indigenous norms, and the promise of gifts or projects contingent on support for the highway. According to the consultation, most communities supported the construction of the road, but indigenous communities have denounced that the consultation process was not conducted in good faith, and was aimed at justifying the derogation of Law 180.

In 2017, the governing MAS party introduced legislation to repeal the intangibility protections of Law 180 and to authorize the drafting of a transportation plan. This law, the Law for the Protection, Integral and Sustainable Development of TIPNIS (Spanish: Ley de Protección, Desarrollo Integral y Sustentable del Territorio Indígena Parque Nacional Isiboro Sécure (TIPNIS)), was enacted as Law 969 on August 13, 2017. The law repealed special protections for the park and authorized the drafting of a transportation plan for TIPNIS. Law 969 opens the park for the construction of roads and other infrastructure, as well as for private investment.

=== Oil development ===
A significant number of oil and gas drilling concessions authorized by the government are located within the Park. The Chispani, Río Hondo, and Sécure (zones 19 and 20) concession blocks are partially or mostly located within the TIPNIS boundaries. The Sécure block, is controlled by Petroandina, a joint venture of Bolivia state oil company YPFB and Venezuelan state oil company PDVSA, which has carried out aerial surveys in the early stages of oil exploration. The Río Hondo block is a joint venture of the Brazilian state company Petrobras, Total of France, and YPFB, authorized by Law 3672 on April 23, 2007. Two exploratory wells were previously drilled in the park, Villa Tunari X-1 A, which reached a 3,032-meter depth, and Eva Eva X-1, which was drilled 5,830 meters deep between 1999 and 2001. The National Service for Protected Areas (SERNAP), which oversees Bolivia's national parks, has stated that oil exploration and extraction could cause serious damage to the rivers and ecosystems of TIPNIS.
