= Quiquibey River =

River in Pilón Lajas, Bolivia

Coordinates: 14.63°S 67.53°W

The Quiquibey River is a river in the Pilón Lajas Biosphere Reserve and Communal Lands in the north of Bolivia. The Quiquibey River joins the Beni River south of Rurrenabaque (upstream and south of Beni's tributary the Tuichi River). The river is the border between the departments of Beni and La Paz.
