= Useuta River =

Coordinates: 17.0°S 64.3°W

Location
- Country: Bolivia

Useuta is a river in Bolivia, and is a tributary of the Mamoré-Madeira river system.
