= Sacta River =

Coordinates: 17°S 66°W

Sacta

Location
- Country: Bolivia
- Region: Cochabamba Department

Sacta is a river in Cochabamba Department, in central Bolivia.
