= Víbora River =

River in Bolivia

Coordinates: 17°02′S 64°32′W

Víbora River (Spanish: Río Vibora, Río Víbora, Río La Víbora) is a river in Santa Cruz Department, in eastern Bolivia.
