= Mamoré River =

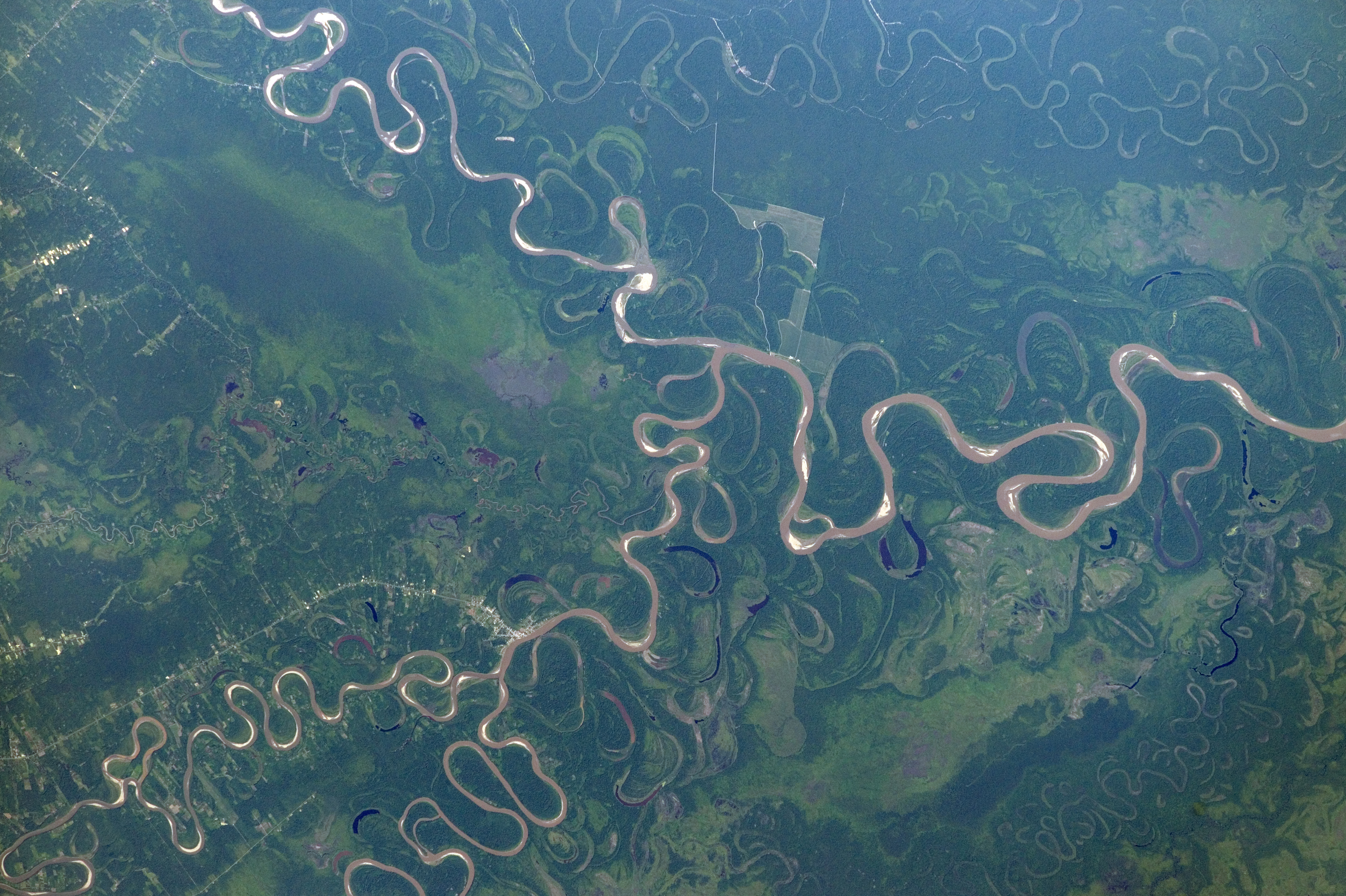
- Confluence of the Ivirgarzama River and the Ichilo River, and of the Chimoré River and the Ichilo River to the Mamoré River (north is to the upper right corner of this ISS image)

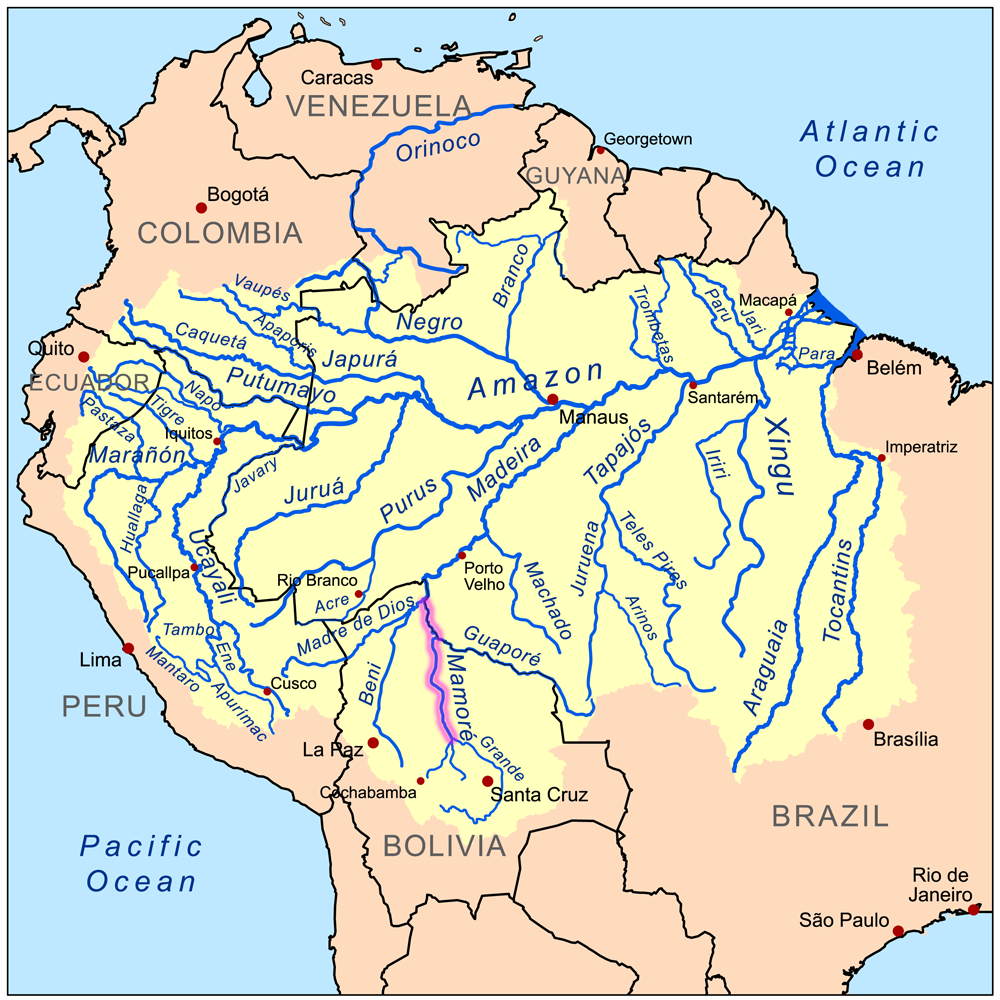
- Map of the Amazon Basin with the Mamoré River highlighted

Location
- Country: Brazil, Bolivia

Physical characteristics
- Source: Sierra de Cochabamba
  - location: Pojo, Bolivia
  - coordinates: 17°37′59″S 64°56′02″W
  - elevation: 3,372 m (11,063 ft)
- Mouth: Madeira River
  - location: near Vila Murtinho, Brazil/Bolivia border
  - coordinates: 10°22′59″S 65°23′35″W
  - elevation: 110 m (360 ft)
- Length: 1,930 km (1,200 mi)
- Basin size: 637,401.1 km^{2} (246,101.9 mi^{2})
- Discharge
  - location: Near mouth
  - average: (Period: 1985–2013)8,150 m^{3}/s (288,000 cu ft/s) (Period: 1971–2000)8,857.3 m^{3}/s (312,790 cu ft/s)
- Discharge
  - location: Guayaramerín; Basin size: 611,800 km^{2} (236,200 sq mi)
  - average: (Period: 1985–2013)7,650 m^{3}/s (270,000 cu ft/s) (Period: 1971–2000)8,414.5 m^{3}/s (297,160 cu ft/s)
  - minimum: (Period: 1985–2013)1,660 m^{3}/s (59,000 cu ft/s)
  - maximum: (Period: 1985–2013)15,200 m^{3}/s (540,000 cu ft/s)
- Discharge
  - location: Puerto Siles; Basin size: 229,300 km^{2} (88,500 sq mi)
  - average: (Period: 1985–2013)4,600 m^{3}/s (160,000 cu ft/s)
  - minimum: (Period: 1985–2013)1,180 m^{3}/s (42,000 cu ft/s)
  - maximum: (Period: 1985–2013)8,850 m^{3}/s (313,000 cu ft/s)
- Discharge
  - location: Camiaco; Basin size: 128,800 km^{2} (49,700 sq mi)
  - average: (Period: 1985–2013)2,180 m^{3}/s (77,000 cu ft/s)
  - minimum: (Period: 1985–2013)750 m^{3}/s (26,000 cu ft/s)
  - maximum: (Period: 1985–2013)3,900 m^{3}/s (140,000 cu ft/s)

Basin features
- Progression: Madeira → Amazon → Atlantic Ocean
- River system: Amazon
- Tributaries
  - left: Chapare, Isiboro, Apere, Yacuma, San Miguel, Yata
  - right: Rio Grande, Ibare, Guaporé, Pacaás Novo

The Mamoré is a large river in Brazil and Bolivia which unites with the Madre de Dios River to form the Madeira, one of the largest tributaries of the Amazon. It rises on the northern slope of the Sierra de Cochabamba, east of the city of Cochabamba, and is known as the Chimoré down to its junction with the Chapare. Its larger tributaries are the Chapare, Secure, Apere, and Yacuma from the west, and the Ichilo, Guapay, Ivari, Manique and Guapore from the east.

Taking into account its length only, the Guapay should be considered the upper part of the Mamore; but it is shallow and obstructed, and carries a much smaller volume of water. The Guapore also rivals the Mamore in length and volume, having its source in the Parecis plateau, Mato Grosso, Brazil, a few miles from streams flowing north-ward to the Tapajos and Amazon, and southward to the Paraguay and Paraná rivers.

The Mamore is interrupted by rapids a few miles above its junction with the Beni, but a railway 300 km long has been undertaken from below the rapids of the Madeira. Above the rapids the river is navigable to Chimore, at the foot of the sierra, and most of its tributaries are navigable for long distances. In 1874, Franz Keller gave the outflow of the Mamoré at mean water level, and not including the Guapore, as 41,459 cm^{3}/sec (2,530 cub. in. per second), and the area of its drainage basin, also not including the Guapore, as 24,299 km^{2} (9,382 square miles).

An extensive pre-Columbian civilization existed in the basin of the Mamore in the swampy area known as the Llanos de Moxos, in northeastern Bolivia.

== See also ==
- Mamoré–Guaporé linguistic area
