= Ibaresito River =

Coordinates: 17°S 65°W

Location
- Country: Bolivia

The Ibasresito (Spanish: El arroyo Ibaresito) is a stream in the Beni Department, in northeastern Bolivia.
