= San Borja, Bolivia =

San Borja
- City
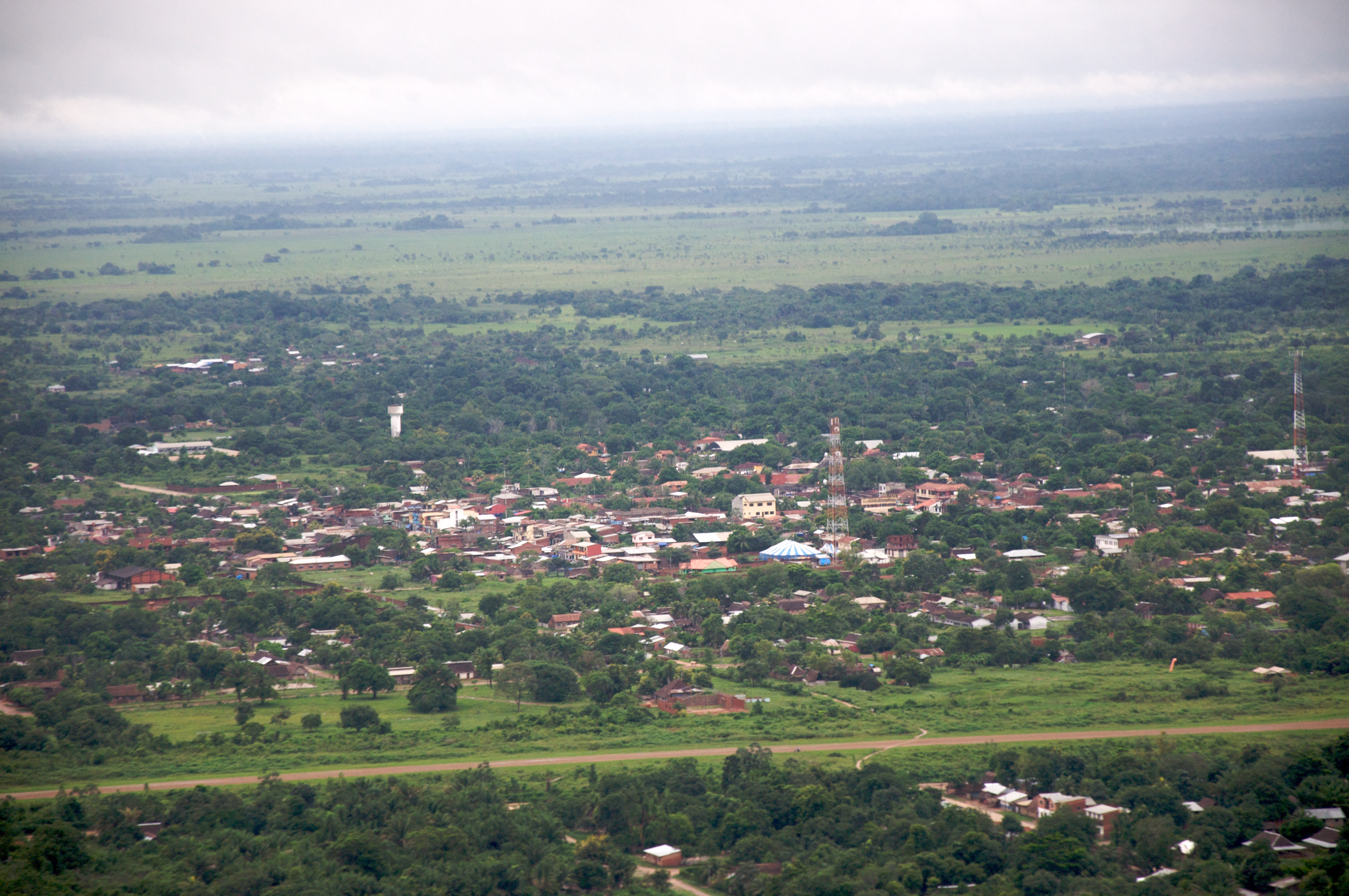

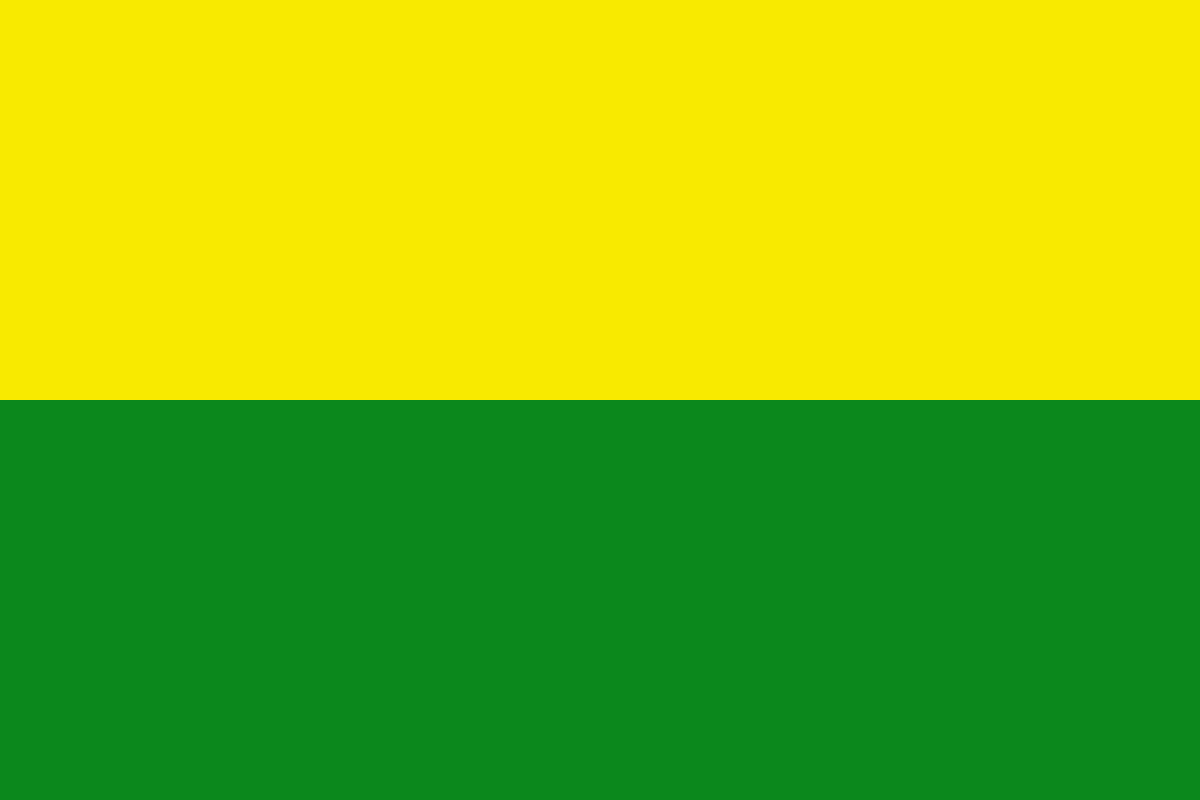
- Flag

- Location in Bolivia
- Coordinates: 14°51′30″S 66°44′51″W
- Country: Bolivia
- Department: Beni Department
- Province: José Ballivián Province
- Municipality: San Borja Municipality
- Canton: San Borja Canton
- Elevation: 197 m (646 ft)

Population (2012)
  - Total: 24,610
- Time zone: UTC-4 (BOT)
- Area code: +591 389

San Borja is a city in the Beni Department in northern Bolivia, It is the most populous city in the province of General José Ballivián.

== Location ==
San Borja is the seat of the San Borja Municipality, the second municipal section of the José Ballivián Province. The city is located at an elevation of 197 metres (646 ft) on the left bank of Río Maniqui, a tributary of Río Rapulo which flows into Río Mamoré.

== Geography ==
San Borja sits on the far southwestern edge of the Llanos de Moxos. San Borja straddles the transition zone from flat mosaics of floodplains and forest islands, to Southwestern Amazonian Rainforest. San Borja's orography is generally homogenous and flat.

San Borja has a tropical monsoon climate, type (Am) in the Köppen classification system bordering on a tropical rainforest climate. Rain is plentiful but divided between a distinct wet and dry season. Like many areas in Bolivia and Latin America generally, San Borja is subject to considerable fluctuations in seasonal and annual precipitation, particularly as a consequence of climate-change related anomalies.

=== Climate ===
Climate data for San Borja, elevation 194 m (636 ft)
Month	Jan	Feb	Mar	Apr	May	Jun	Jul	Aug	Sep	Oct	Nov	Dec	Year
Record high °C (°F)	35.0 (95.0)	35.0 (95.0)	36.0 (96.8)	34.6 (94.3)	35.8 (96.4)	33.3 (91.9)	34.2 (93.6)	36.4 (97.5)	38.3 (100.9)	36.5 (97.7)	36.0 (96.8)	36.8 (98.2)	38.3 (100.9)
Mean daily maximum °C (°F)	31.3 (88.3)	30.8 (87.4)	31.2 (88.2)	30.8 (87.4)	28.9 (84.0)	28.0 (82.4)	28.4 (83.1)	30.4 (86.7)	31.8 (89.2)	32.5 (90.5)	32.1 (89.8)	31.6 (88.9)	30.7 (87.2)
Daily mean °C (°F)	26.9 (80.4)	26.5 (79.7)	26.7 (80.1)	25.9 (78.6)	24.0 (75.2)	22.9 (73.2)	22.4 (72.3)	23.8 (74.8)	25.4 (77.7)	26.7 (80.1)	26.9 (80.4)	26.9 (80.4)	25.4 (77.7)
Mean daily minimum °C (°F)	22.5 (72.5)	22.2 (72.0)	22.1 (71.8)	21.0 (69.8)	19.1 (66.4)	17.7 (63.9)	16.5 (61.7)	17.3 (63.1)	18.9 (66.0)	20.8 (69.4)	21.7 (71.1)	22.2 (72.0)	20.2 (68.3)
Record low °C (°F)	20.6 (69.1)	20.0 (68.0)	17.2 (63.0)	15.0 (59.0)	10.0 (50.0)	9.9 (49.8)	8.9 (48.0)	10.0 (50.0)	13.8 (56.8)	16.1 (61.0)	16.0 (60.8)	19.0 (66.2)	8.9 (48.0)
Average precipitation mm (inches)	277.1 (10.91)	267.1 (10.52)	221.4 (8.72)	137.8 (5.43)	100.9 (3.97)	74.5 (2.93)	61.4 (2.42)	51.6 (2.03)	76.1 (3.00)	148.5 (5.85)	169.0 (6.65)	242.9 (9.56)	1,828.3 (71.99)
Average precipitation days	11.9	12.2	10.6	7.1	6.8	6.0	4.8	3.6	4.6	7.0	8.1	10.5	93.2
Source 1: Servicio Nacional de Meteorología e Hidrología de Bolivia
Source 2: Deutscher Wetterdienst (extremes)

== Transport ==
By road, San Borja is situated 230 kilometres (140 mi) west of the department's capital, Trinidad.

San Borja is connected towards the southwest with Yucumo situated on the road and a bus route La Paz - Yolosa/Coroico - Caranavi - Rurrenabaque. Yucumo is halfway between Caranavi and Rurrenabaque. Towards the east of San Borja Route 3 leads to San Ignacio de Moxos and farther to Trinidad, the capital of the Beni Department.

The airport of San Borja has regular services from two airlines: Línea Aérea Amaszonas and TAM - Transporte Aéreo Militar (the Bolivian Military Airline)

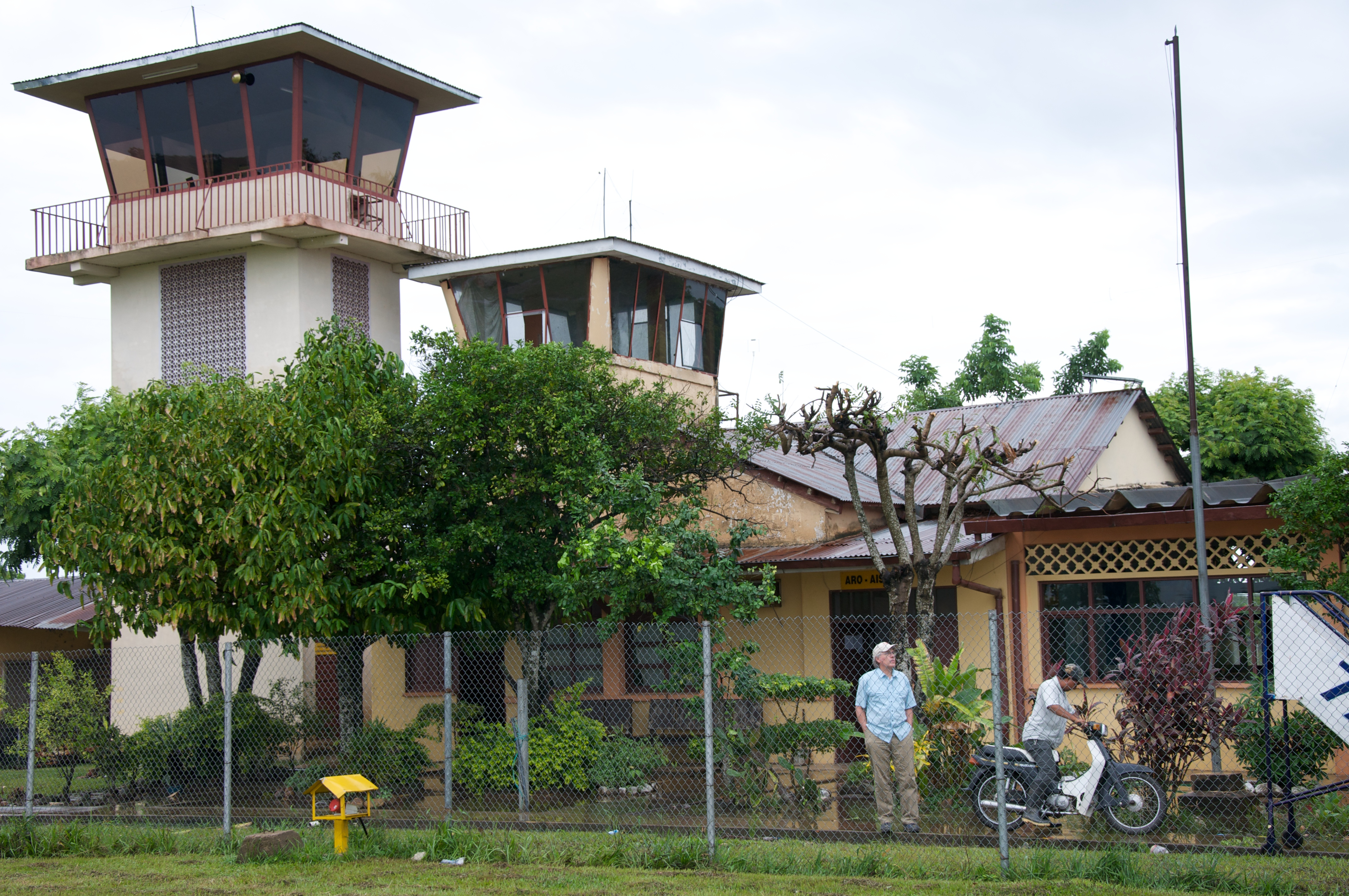
San Borja airport

== Population ==
The town's population has increased strongly over the past three decades:

- 1976: 4,613 inhabitants (census)
- 1992: 11,072 inhabitants (census)
- 2001: 16,273 inhabitants (census)
- 2010: 24,610 inhabitants (est.)

In spite of high migration figures over the past decades, the city still has a noteworthy percentage of indigenous population; 17.7 percent of the San Borja Municipality population speak local indigenous languages.

== Maps ==
- www.mirabolivia.com/mapas (four different types)
- www.mirabolivia.com/mapa_muestra.php?id_mapa=12 (road map sheet showing San Borja and Yucumo)
