= Isiboro River =

Coordinates: 15.2258°S 64.9336°W

Location
- Country: Bolivia
- Region: Cochabamba Department

Physical characteristics
- Length: 505 km (314 mi)

The Isiboro River is a river of Bolivia.

== See also ==
- List of rivers of Bolivia
- Isiboro Sécure National Park and Indigenous Territory
