= Sécure River =

Coordinates: 15.2258°S 64.9336°W

Location
- Country: Bolivia

Physical characteristics
- Length: 497 km (309 mi)

The Sécure River is a river of Bolivia.

== See also ==
- List of rivers of Bolivia
- Isiboro Sécure National Park and Indigenous Territory
