= Yuracaré people =

Indigenous people of Bolivia

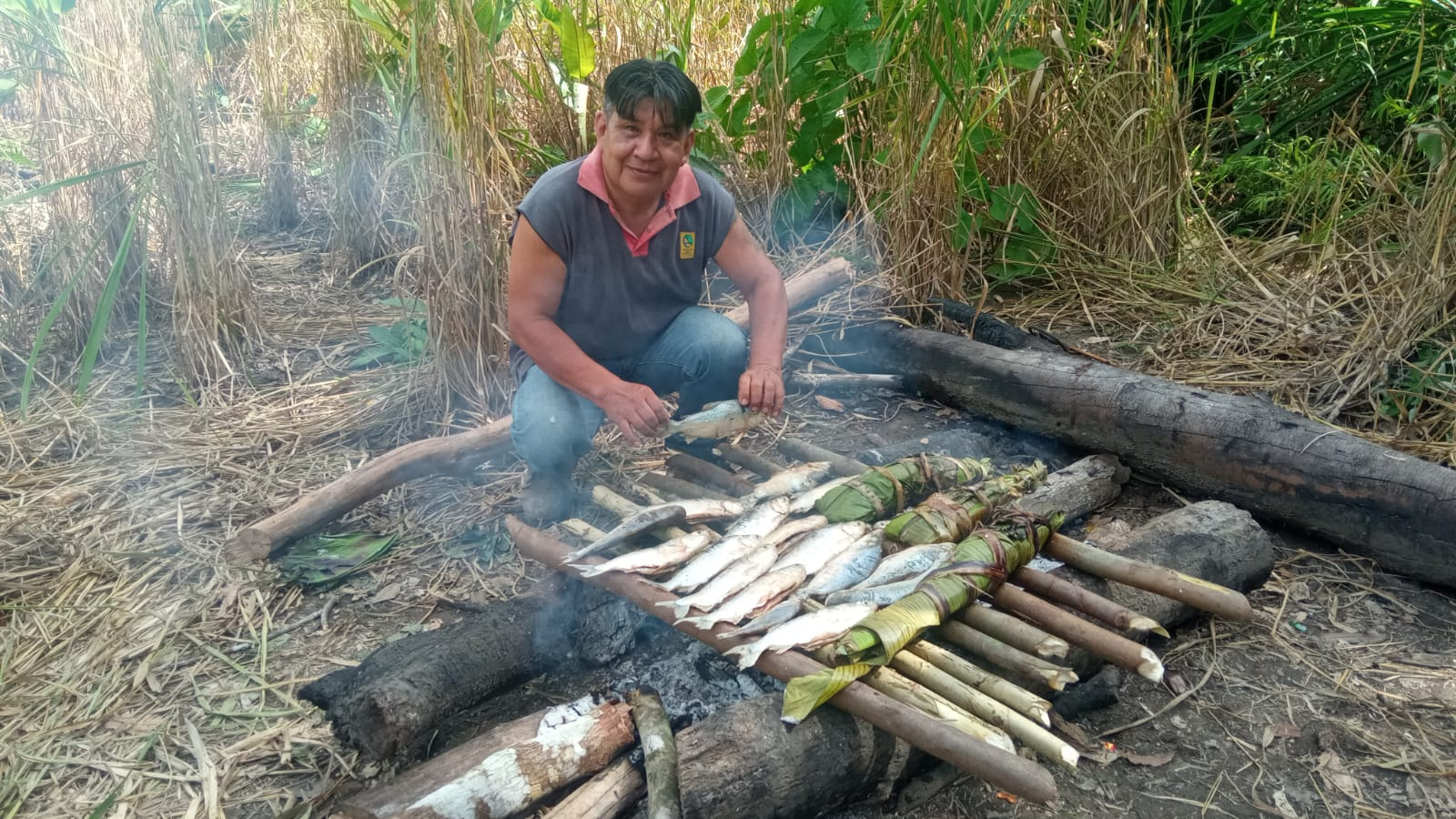
Yuracaré man preparing fish

Yuracaré (also called Yurujare, Yurucare) are Bolivian indigenous people living on 2,500 square kilometres along the Chapare River watershed in Cochabamba Department and Beni Department, in the Bolivian Lowlands of the Amazon Basin. The Yuracaré reside not far from Santa Cruz de la Sierra and Cochabamba, among the forests and plains near the Andes. They are among the residents of the Yuracaré Native Community Land (TCO), the Yuqui TCO, the Isiboro Sécure National Park and Indigenous Territory, the Chiman Indigenous Territory, and the Multiethnic Indigenous Territory I.

The Yuracare language is a language isolate, and is believed to be spoken in Bolivia by between 500 and 2,500 people. There are about 400 families in the Cochabamba Department and 62 Yuracare households in the Beni Department. The Yuracaré, who are one of approximately 35 Bolivian indigenous groups, traditionally bury their dead along with their bow and arrows, as it is a belief that the dead go to a place underground where game is plentiful.

== Modern issues ==
Indiana University's IFRI, along with the Center for the Study of Economic and Social Reality (CERES), has done research among the Yuracaré regarding the way the Yuracaré manage their forests. The organization helped the Yuracaré develop a forest management plan and receive official land titles to their territory by 1996, and in 1998 the Bolivian government officially approved the management plan. This was the first time in Bolivian history that an indigenous group was granted concessionary forest management rights. Further, the IFRI said that the natives' forest management practices increase the amount and size of fruiting trees. The Yuracaré find it important to maintain the forest because certain trees bear the fruit that is necessary in attracting the game that they hunt and which they live off.

Like other indigenous groups in Bolivia, the Yuracaré have faced difficulties in recent years. Bolivia is South America's poorest nation, and the native populations are generally amoing the most financially deprived in the nation. Having remained isolated over the years, authentic native traditions have still survived, while evolving under Catholic (in this case, the Jesuits of Paraguayan Reductions) and Spanish influences. The proliferation of the Spanish language has led to disconnect and even friction between native tongues and Spanish-speakers. Globalization has been a major issue, and the Yuracaré have struggled to maintain their language and customs. In 2025, the first Yuracare-Spanish dictionary and grammar was published as an attempt at preserving the language.

== See also ==
- Yuracaré language
