= Chimoré, Cochabamba =

Chimoré
- Location in Bolivia
- Coordinates: 16°59′S 65°08′W
- Country: Bolivia
- Department: Cochabamba Department
- Province: Carrasco Province
- Municipality: Chimoré Municipality
- Canton: Chimoré Canton

Population (2001)
  - Total: 3,874
- Time zone: UTC-4 (BOT)

Chimoré is a location in the Carrasco Province, Cochabamba Department, Bolivia. It is the seat of the Chimoré Municipality.

== Geography ==
Chimoré is located in the wettest region of the Bolivia, situated in the Amazon rainforests of the Chapare region. While Chimoré experiences a short dry season, rain is plentiful year round, and temperatures are generally warm to hot. The area has a tropical rainforest climate according to the Köppen Classification System.

Climate data for Chimoré
Month	Jan	Feb	Mar	Apr	May	Jun	Jul	Aug	Sep	Oct	Nov	Dec	Year
Record high °C (°F)	38.1 (100.6)	37.8 (100.0)	39.3 (102.7)	38.0 (100.4)	34.0 (93.2)	32.2 (90.0)	32.0 (89.6)	35.0 (95.0)	36.4 (97.5)	38.4 (101.1)	40.3 (104.5)	38.4 (101.1)	40.3 (104.5)
Mean daily maximum °C (°F)	30.2 (86.4)	30.5 (86.9)	29.5 (85.1)	27.7 (81.9)	24.9 (76.8)	23.1 (73.6)	23.9 (75.0)	27.7 (81.9)	29.4 (84.9)	29.8 (85.6)	30.7 (87.3)	31.4 (88.5)	28.2 (82.8)
Daily mean °C (°F)	26.8 (80.2)	26.6 (79.9)	26.2 (79.2)	24.7 (76.5)	22.8 (73.0)	20.4 (68.7)	21.1 (70.0)	23.0 (73.4)	25.2 (77.4)	26.4 (79.5)	27.1 (80.8)	27.0 (80.6)	24.8 (76.6)
Mean daily minimum °C (°F)	21.3 (70.3)	21.3 (70.3)	20.5 (68.9)	18.9 (66.0)	16.5 (61.7)	15.4 (59.7)	14.8 (58.6)	16.3 (61.3)	18.7 (65.7)	19.8 (67.6)	20.3 (68.5)	20.9 (69.6)	18.7 (65.7)
Record low °C (°F)	20.4 (68.7)	19.0 (66.2)	19.0 (66.2)	17.5 (63.5)	15.0 (59.0)	11.0 (51.8)	10.0 (50.0)	14.4 (57.9)	16.7 (62.1)	18.0 (64.4)	18.3 (64.9)	19.0 (66.2)	10.0 (50.0)
Average precipitation mm (inches)	737.1 (29.02)	764.4 (30.09)	621.6 (24.47)	337.9 (13.30)	168.4 (6.63)	102.7 (4.04)	87.3 (3.44)	67.5 (2.66)	115.5 (4.55)	220.2 (8.67)	358.8 (14.13)	604.0 (23.78)	4,185.4 (164.78)
Average precipitation days (≥ 1.0 mm)	14.0	11.1	12.7	9.4	11.4	5.4	4.0	5.6	7.6	9.4	10.1	11.9	111.6
Average relative humidity (%)	79	79	79	78	79	78	73	65	64	67	72	77	74
Source: SENAMHI

== Transports ==
The city is served by the Chimore Airport (IATA: CCA, ICAO: SLHI).
