= Chimoré River =

Coordinates: 16°43′S 64°49′W

Chimoré
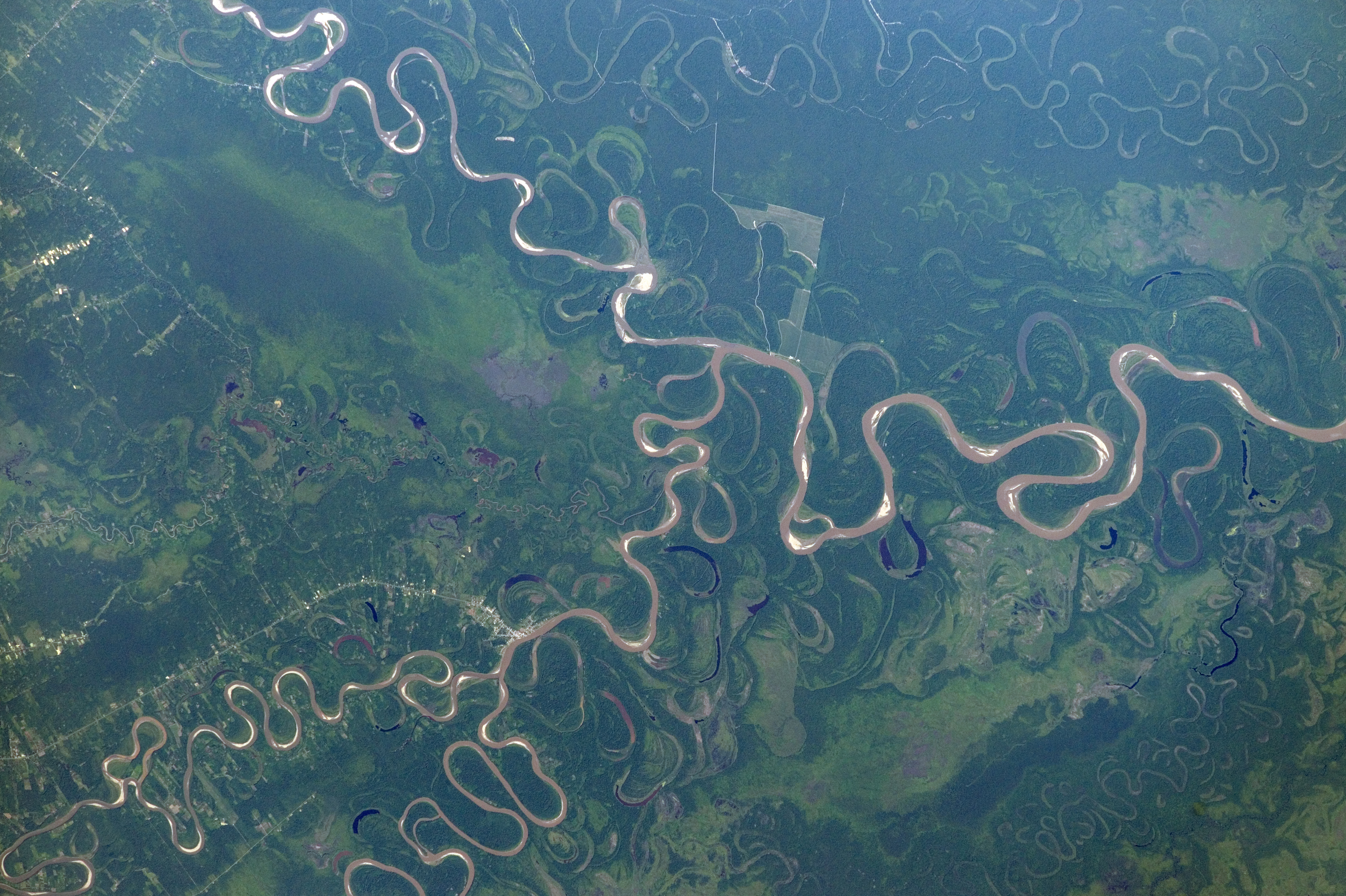
- Confluence of the Ivirgarzama River and the Ichilo River, and of the Chimoré River and the Ichilo River to the Mamoré River (north is to the upper right corner of this ISS image)

Location
- Country: Bolivia
- Region: Cochabamba Department, Santa Cruz Department

Chimoré River (Spanish: Río Chimoré) is a river in the departments of Cochabamba and Santa Cruz in Bolivia.
