= Lloyd Aéreo Boliviano Flight 301 =

2008 aviation accident in Bolivia

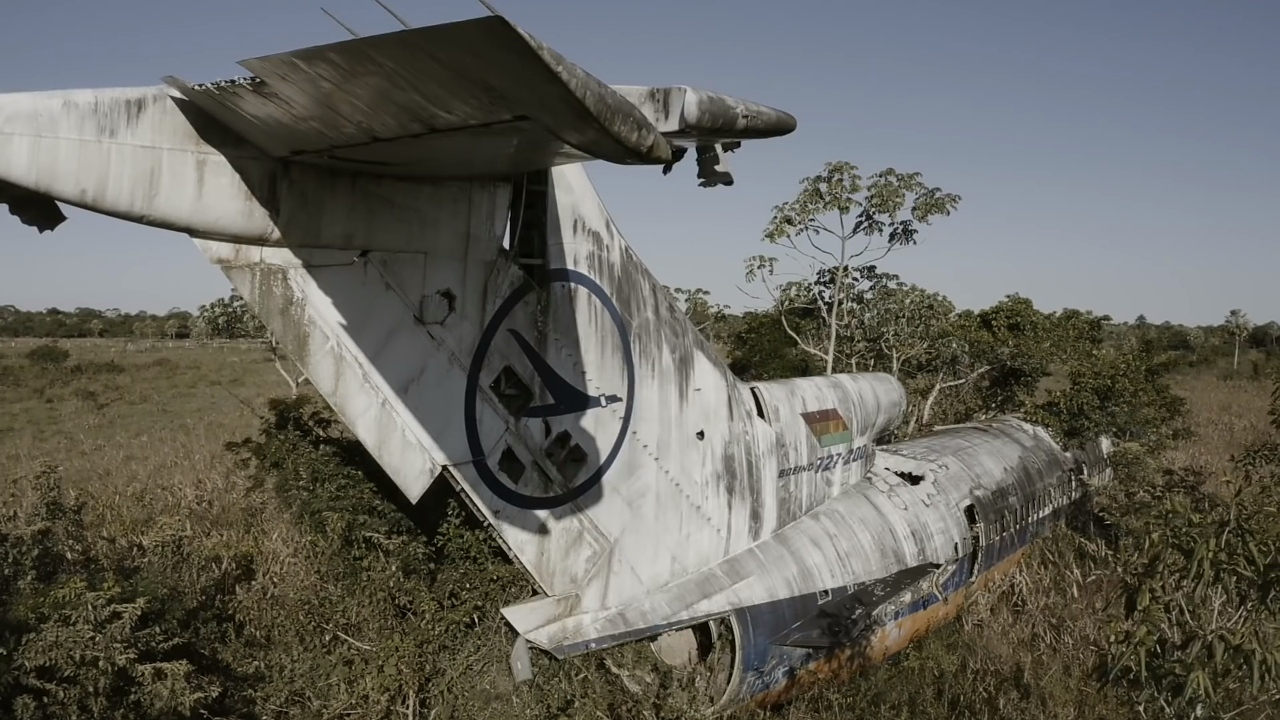
- The abandoned aircraft in 2019

Accident
- Date: 1 February 2008
- Summary: Forced landing near the airport; possible fuel exhaustion
- Site: Near Trinidad, Bolivia

Aircraft
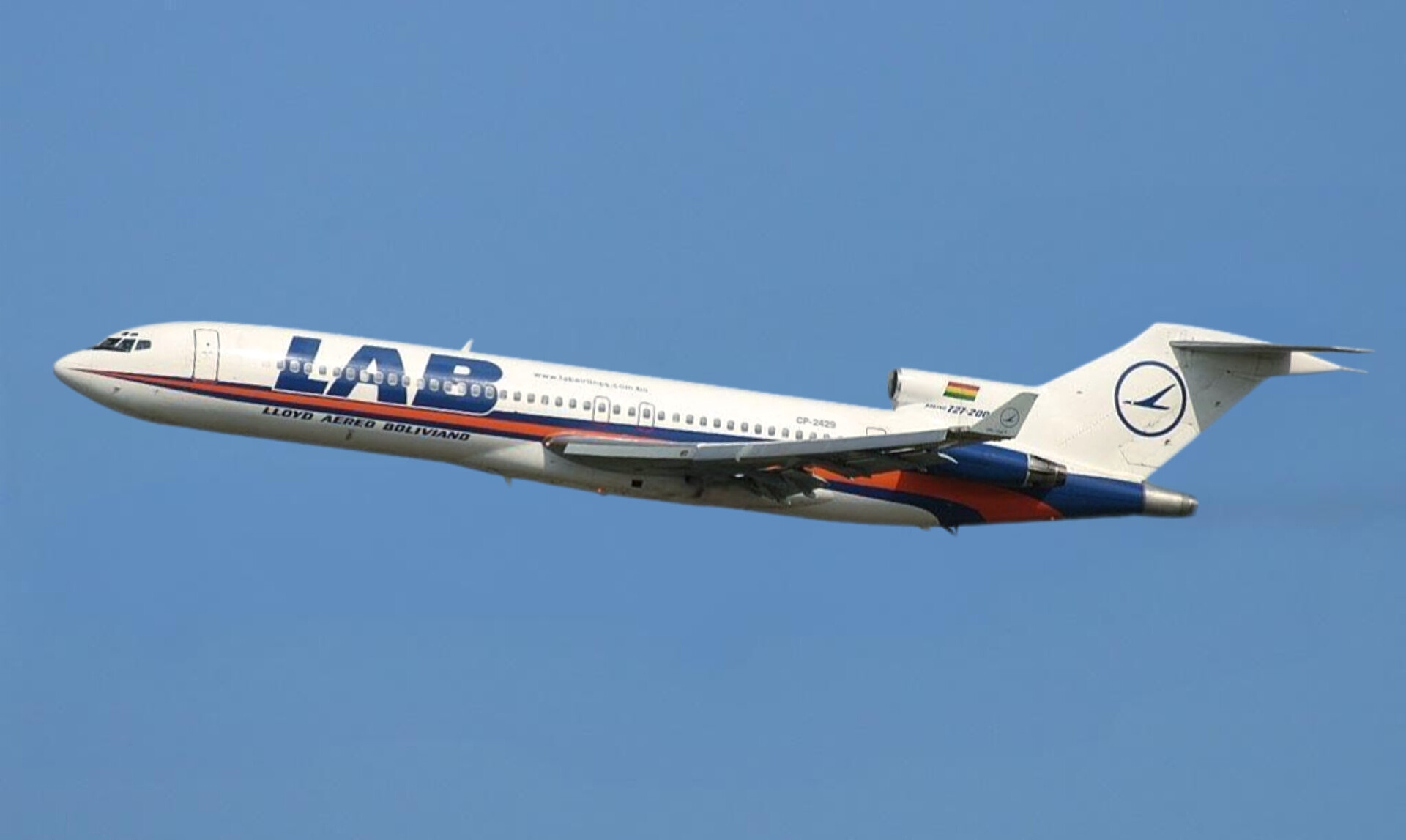
- CP-2429, the aircraft involved in the accident, seen in 2007
- Aircraft type: Boeing 727-259
- Operator: Lloyd Aéreo Boliviano
- IATA flight No.: LB301
- ICAO flight No.: LLB301
- Call sign: BOLIVIANO 301
- Registration: CP-2429
- Flight origin: El Alto International Airport, La Paz, Bolivia
- Destination: Captain Aníbal Arab Airport, Cobija, Bolivia
- Occupants: 156
- Passengers: 151
- Crew: 5
- Fatalities: 0
- Injuries: 2
- Survivors: 156

Lloyd Aéreo Boliviano Flight 301 was a scheduled charter flight from El Alto International Airport in La Paz, to Captain Aníbal Arab Airport in Cobija. On 1 February 2008, the Boeing 727-259 operating this flight ran out of fuel while on approach to Teniente Jorge Henrich Arauz Airport in Trinidad as an alternate route. The aircraft made an emergency landing in a swampy area a few kilometres from the airport. All 156 people on board survived, while two people only suffered minor injuries.

== Background ==
The aircraft was a Boeing 727-259 Advanced manufactured in 1980, with serial number 22475 and had Pratt & Whitney JT8D-17R engines. It was operated by the former flag carrier of Bolivia, Lloyd Aéreo Boliviano (LAB). After its manufacture, the aircraft was delivered to Avianca on 4 December 1980 (N204AV), then on 14 December 1993 it was delivered to Capitol Air Express with the same registration. On 1 October 1994 it was delivered to Sun Country Airlines (N289SC), until being delivered to LAB on 28 December 2002 with the registration CP-2429.

In 2006 the aircraft entered maintenance at Jorge Chávez International Airport in Lima, Peru. The maintenance lasted about a year, after maintenance, the reintegration process took about two months, and returned to service on 4 June 2007. As for the airline, Lloyd Aéreo Boliviano, which is partially owned by the Bolivian state, has been grounded since late March 2007 due to liquidity and security difficulties. It recently resumed operations with charter flights amid a dispute with local aviation authorities due to the alleged lack of relevant permits.

On board were 151 passengers and 5 crew members. The captain was Roberto Lobo Gómez, who had worked for the airline for 29 years. The first officer was Javier Gandarillas.

== Accident ==
The flight had been chartered by Transporte Aéreo Militar (TAM) to transport stranded passengers due to route closures as part of the solidarity flights enabled by that company. The plane took off from El Alto International Airport in La Paz, Bolivia, to Captain Aníbal Arab Airport in Cobija, Pando, however, the pilots attempted several landing attempts at Cobija Airport, without success. The pilots were advised that the airport was closed due to bad weather in Cobija, so they decided to divert to Teniente Jorge Henrich Arauz Airport in Trinidad, Beni.

During the flight to Trinidad, the pilots also faced adverse weather conditions. However, the plane ran out of fuel due to the delay caused by the closure of Cobija Airport and weather conditions, and the captain attempted an emergency landing near Trinidad Airport. At 10:35 a.m., the plane made a forced landing in a swampy area a few kilometers near the airport. There was no fire, and damage to the aircraft was minimal. Despite the impact, all 151 passengers and five crew members on board survived the crash; it was considered a "miracle" that there were no fatalities.

Soldiers from the Reynaldo Zeballos Sergeants School, who were conducting exercises in the area, witnessed the impact and immediately went to aid the passengers, evacuating them and rescuing their luggage. Emergency teams, firefighters, and ambulances were deployed to assist those affected. Only two passengers received minor bruises and were taken to the hospital. There were no serious injuries, or fatal outcomes. Despite the seriousness of the incident, the pilots' expertise prevented a greater tragedy. The aircraft was left with broken wings, shattered glass, and a damaged fuselage, but no human losses.

Currently, the aircraft is located in the same place since the accident, over the years, many people have removed the valuable parts of the plane, including the engines and the cockpit seats. Due to its difficult access, it is possible to reach the place where the aircraft is located depending on the time of year, and it is likely that now the Boeing 727 is home to many wild animals of the Bolivian Amazon rainforest.

== Investigation ==
The Directorate General of Civil Aeronautics (DGAC) led the investigation into the incident. A preliminary report determined that the main cause was fuel exhaustion: The CEO of AASANA, Rimort Chávez, said that the plane had two hours of fuel, but that it should have had an extra 45 minutes of reserve fuel, violating the airline's internal regulations. The Deputy Minister of Transport, José Kinn, confirmed that, according to the official DGAC report, the aircraft arrived in Trinidad with such a low fuel load that the pumps were unable to feed the engines during landing. In addition to this human factor (fuel planning failure), the study also highlighted poor weather conditions in Cobija (which forced the diversion) and a technical delay on take-off that consumed extra fuel. Although the DGAC established regulations to prevent similar accidents, these were not enforced until after the accident involving LaMia Flight 2933 on 28 November 2016, when an Avro RJ85 flying from Santa Cruz to Medellín crashed into a hill near the airport due to fuel exhaustion. After this incident, fuel control and crew training measures were implemented in Bolivian civil aviation to prevent similar tragedies.

== Consequences ==
The Deputy Minister of Transportation, José Kinn, reported that the DGAC would sanction the airline for the irregularities detected in the operation. The CEO of LAB rejected the conclusions about the lack of fuel and blamed Cobija air traffic control (operated by AASANA) for allegedly giving erroneous instructions, insisting that adverse weather contributed to the incident. LAB has ceased operations since the incident, but has been re-opened for charter flights, with no permission to resume commercial flights.

== See also ==
- Eastern Air Lines Flight 980
- LaMia Flight 2933
- 1976 Lloyd Aéreo Boliviano Boeing 707 crash
