= TBI plc =

TBI Limited
- Formerly: Markheath plc Thomas Bailey Investments plc TBI plc
- Company type: Subsidiary
- Industry: Airport management
- Founded: 1972
- Headquarters: United Kingdom
- Owners: Abertis (90%), Aena Internacional (10%)
- Parent: Airport Concessions and Development Limited (ACDL)

TBI Limited was an airport owner and operator, incorporated in the United Kingdom in 1972. It was a subsidiary of Airport Concessions and Development Limited (ACDL), owned by Spanish companies Abertis Infraestructuras S.A. (90%) and AENA Desarrollo Internacional S.A. (10%).

== History ==
The company was founded as a property broker named Markheath plc. It was bought out by Thomas Bailey Investments plc. The company changed its name to TBI plc in March 1994 and to TBI Limited in 2009. From 1994 to 2004 Keith Brooks held the position of chief executive officer. At which point the company was sold but Brooks stayed on as Non-executive director.

TBI bought Cardiff Airport in 1995, and sold it to the Welsh Government in 2013.

In 2004 the company was acquired by Airport Concessions and Development Limited (ACDL), owned by Spanish companies Abertis Infraestructuras S.A. (90%) and AENA Desarrollo Internacional S.A. (10%).

In 2013, the Bolivian government led by Evo Morales nationalized the airports in Bolivia for which the company owned concessions through its subsidiary Sabsa (the three biggest airports in the country: El Alto International Airport, Jorge Wilstermann International Airport and Viru Viru International Airport).

== TBI airports ==
=== Sweden ===
- Stockholm-Skavsta Airport

=== United Kingdom ===
- Belfast International Airport
- London Luton Airport

=== United States ===
- Orlando Sanford International Airport

Additionally, TBI provides airport management services at Atlanta and Macon, Georgia and Burbank, California in the US.
