= Captain Aníbal Arab Airport =

Airport serving Cobija, Bolivia

Captain Aníbal Arab Airport Heroes Del Acre Airport
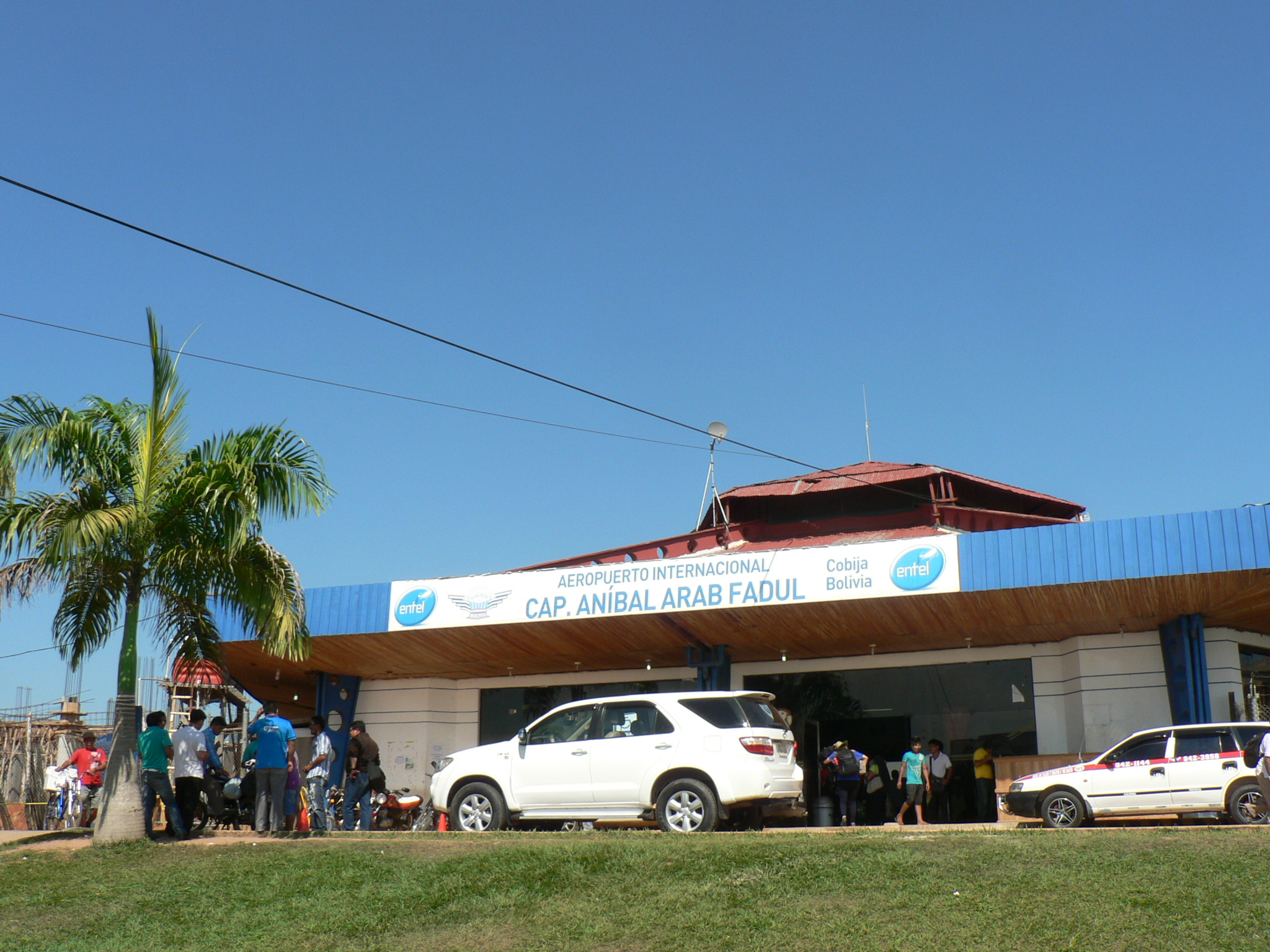
- IATA: CIJ; ICAO: SLCO

Summary
- Airport type: Public
- Operator: Government
- Serves: Cobija, Bolivia
- Elevation AMSL: 804 ft (245 m)
- Coordinates: 11°02′25″S 68°47′00″W

Map
- Location of airport in Bolivia

Runways
Direction	Length		Surface
Direction	m	ft	Surface
02/20	2,600	8,530	Asphalt

Statistics (2023)
- Passengers: 141,610
- Sources: WAD GCM

Captain Aníbal Arab Airport (Spanish: Aeropuerto Capitán Aníbal Arab, IATA: CIJ, ICAO: SLCO) is an airport serving the Acre River port city of Cobija, the capital of the Pando Department of Bolivia. This airport is located at a reasonably near distance to Monumento Pando, and is also at a relatively close proximity to Rio Acre.

The Cobija non-directional beacon (Ident: CIJ) is located on the field.

In December 2025, emergency measures usually reserved for natural disasters were put in place to allow the Bolivian Air Force to arrange flights between Cojiba and La Paz over the new year holiday period as there were no available seats on Boliviana de Aviación's limited scheduled service. In 2026, the Bolivian government invited private operators to commence air taxi operations from the airport to address the aircraft availability concerns that left state-owned carrier unable to meet the ongoing demand for flights to this airport.

== Airlines and destinations ==
Airlines	Destinations
Boliviana de Aviación	La Paz
EcoJet	La Paz
TAMep	Cochabamba, La Paz, Santa Cruz de la Sierra–Viru Viru

== See also ==
- Transport in Bolivia
- List of airports in Bolivia
