= Viru Viru International Airport =

Airport serving Santa Cruz de la Sierra, Bolivia

Viru Viru International Airport Aeropuerto Internacional Viru Viru
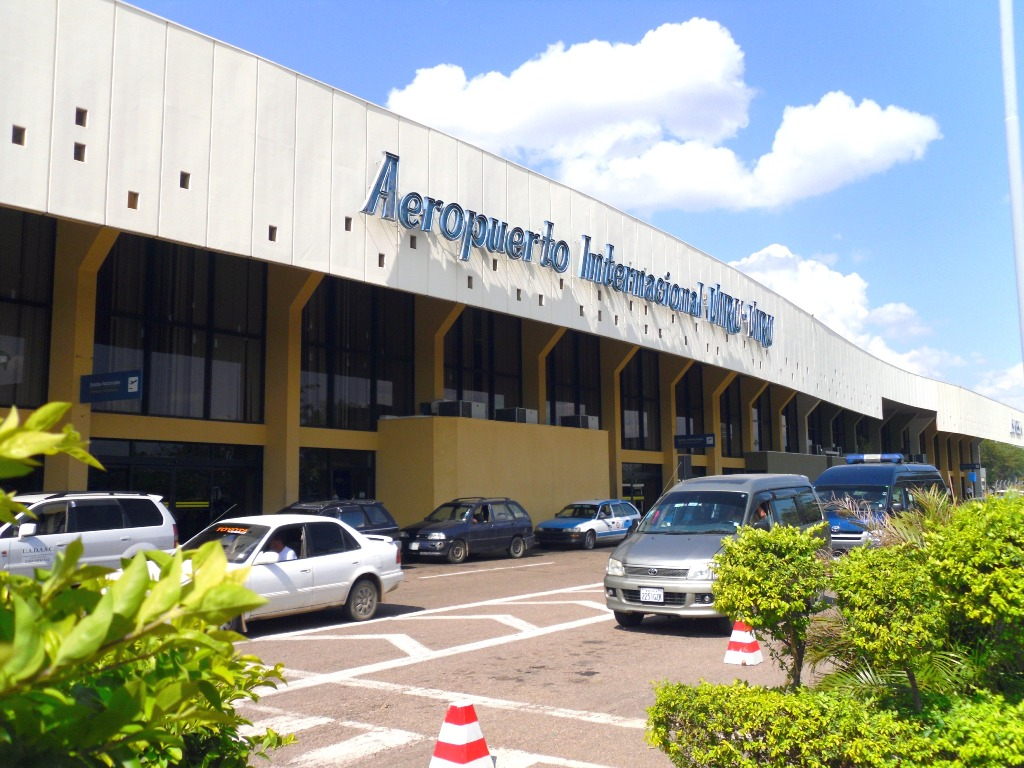
- IATA: VVI; ICAO: SLVR

Summary
- Airport type: Public
- Operator: NAABOL
- Location: Santa Cruz de la Sierra
- Opened: 1983; 43 years ago
- Hub for: Transportes Aéreos Bolivianos
- Focus city for: Boliviana de Aviación
- Elevation AMSL: 1,225 ft (373 m)
- Coordinates: 17°38′41″S 63°08′07″W
- Website: Official website

Map
- Location of airport in Bolivia

Runways
Direction	Length		Surface
Direction	ft	m	Surface
16/34	11,483	3,500	Concrete

Statistics (2023)
- Passengers: 4,116,329
- Source: SABSA, Airport Statistics

Viru Viru International Airport (IATA: VVI, ICAO: SLVR) is an international airport serving Santa Cruz de la Sierra, located 17 km (11 mi) north of the city. It is Bolivia's primary air terminal, handling much of the international traffic into the country. In 2023, the airport handled 4.12 million passengers, making it the busiest airport in Bolivia. It serves as a major focus city for Boliviana de Aviación and offers routes to destinations across South America, North America, and Europe.

== History ==
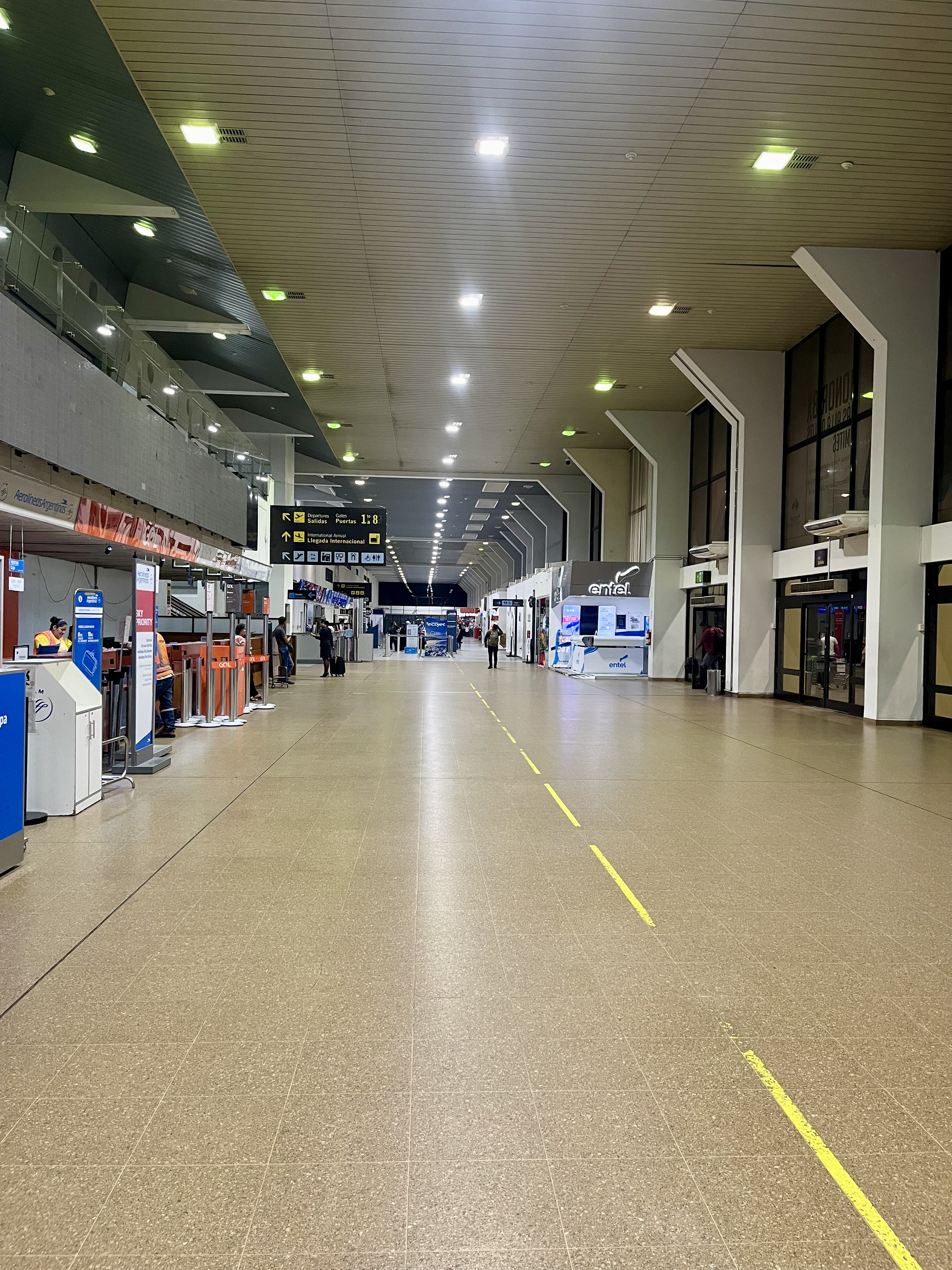
Terminal interior

Plans for the airport in 1965 by General René Barrientos, former president of Bolivia, with the intention of creating an intercontinental airport. Shortly thereafter, construction of the airport began until it was completed and inaugurated in 1983, to replace the obsolete El Trompillo Airport. Upon its inauguration, Viru Viru became a main gateway for international flights. Lloyd Aéreo Boliviano used Viru Viru as a hub before ceasing operations in 2008.

On 1 March 1997, the government of Bolivia entered into a 25-year contract with Airport Group International to operate the three largest airports in Bolivia — El Alto International Airport in La Paz, Jorge Wilstermann International Airport in Cochabamba and Viru Viru International Airport. Servicios de Aeropuertos Bolivianos Sociedad Anonima (SABSA) was created to operate the concession. In 1999, Airport Group International was purchased by TBI plc.

In 2004, Spain's Abertis/AENA purchased TBI. The airport was nationalized by the Bolivian government in 2013.

SABSA has been substituted in March 2022 by the newly established government agency Navegación Aérea y Aeropuertos Bolivianos (NAABOL). This state-owned agency now manages the airports in Bolivia.

=== Name ===
The name "Viru Viru" originates from the indigenous Guarani language spoken in the area. Most likely, "Viru Viru" refers to a toponym or a distinctive geographical feature after which the airport was named. There is some ambiguity about the meaning of it based on sources in the internet. Different meanings have been proposed:

- Some say it means "round object" or "round place", referring to a nearby hill that has a circular shape, resembling a round object.
- Others say it refers to a river that has now disappeared and was located 13 kilometres from the city. The tributary was in the same pampa where the airport was built.
- Lastly, it could mean "pampa, plain", which was the name of the whole geographical area of the place where the airport was built.

Today, some researchers claim the correct spelling of the term would be "Birubiru".

== Airlines and destinations ==
=== Passenger ===
The following airlines operate regular scheduled and charter flights at Viru Viru International Airport:

Airlines	Destinations
Aerolíneas Argentinas	Buenos Aires–Aeroparque
Air Europa	Madrid
Avianca	Bogotá
Boliviana de Aviación	Asunción, Buenos Aires–Ezeiza, Cochabamba, Iquique, La Paz, Lima, Madrid, Miami, Oruro, Panama City–Tocumen, Rio de Janeiro–Galeão, Santiago de Chile, São Paulo–Guarulhos, Sucre, Tarija, Trinidad; Seasonal: Barcelona, Washington–Dulles
Copa Airlines	Panama City–Tocumen
EcoJet	Cobija, Guayaramerín, Riberalta, Sucre, Tarija, Trinidad
Gol Linhas Aéreas	São Paulo–Guarulhos
LATAM Chile	Santiago de Chile
LATAM Perú	Lima
Paranair	Asunción
TAMep	Cochabamba, La Paz
