= Boliviana de Aviación =

State-owned flag carrier of Bolivia

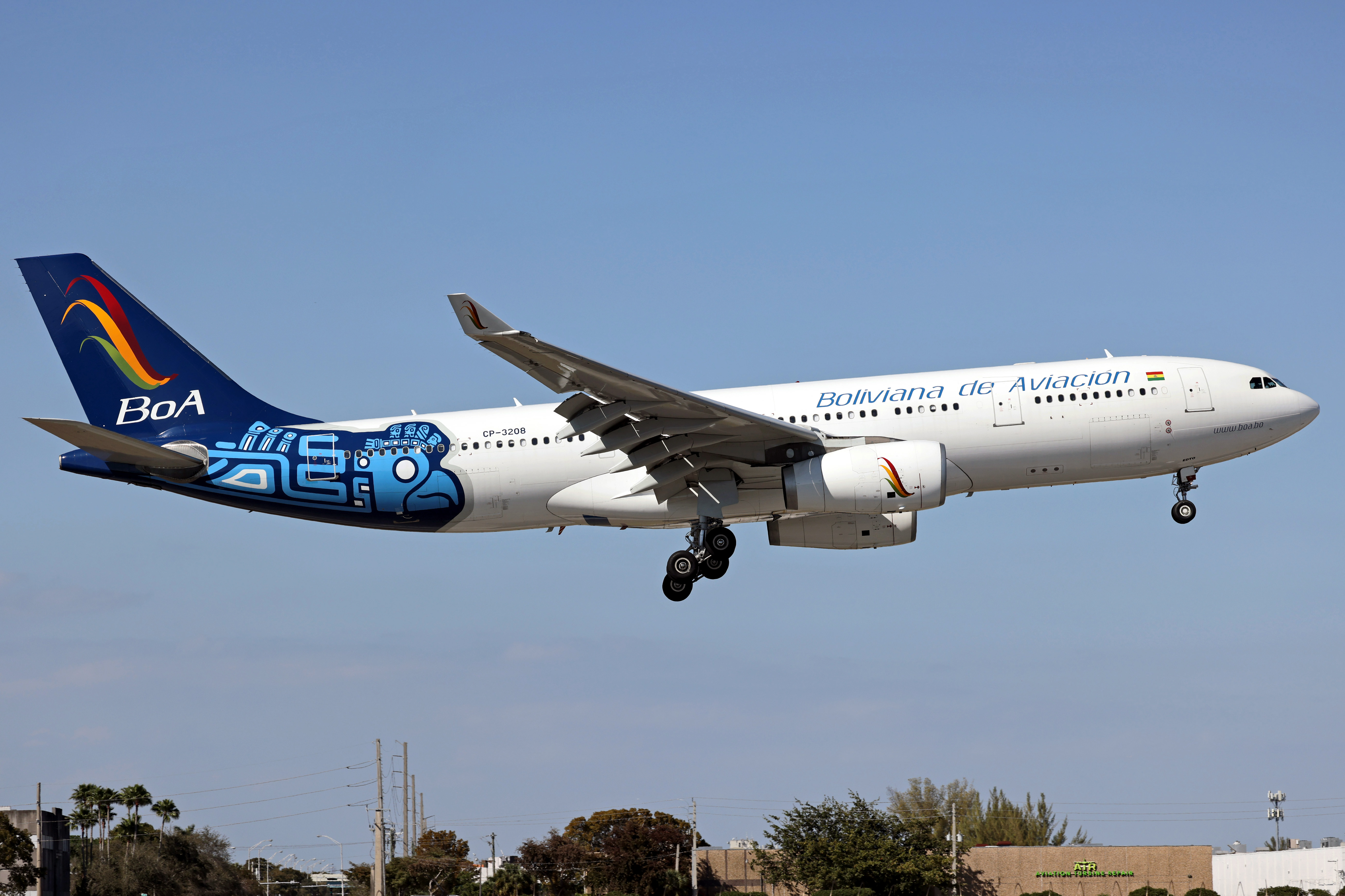
- Airbus A330-200
IATA	ICAO	Call sign
OB	BOV	BOLIVIANA
- Founded: 24 October 2007
- AOC #: 119-01-005
- Hubs: Jorge Wilstermann International Airport
- Focus cities: El Alto International Airport; Viru Viru International Airport
- Frequent-flyer program: Elévate
- Fleet size: 17
- Destinations: 19
- Parent company: Bolivian Government (100%)
- Headquarters: Cochabamba, Bolivia
- Key people: Mario Borda (CEO)
- Revenue: ▲ Bs. 102 million (2014)
- Net income: ▼ Bs. 38.7 million (2014)
- Total assets: ▲ Bs. 629 million (2014)
- Employees: 2,345 (2015)
- Website: www.boa.bo

Boliviana de Aviación (shortened in Spanish for Empresa Pública Nacional Estratégica Boliviana de Aviación "Bolivian National Strategic Aviation Public Company") and stylized as BoA, is the flag carrier airline of Bolivia and is wholly owned by the country's government. Founded in October 2007 and headquartered in Cochabamba, it operates most of its domestic network out of its primary hub at Jorge Wilstermann International Airport while its international services operate out Viru Viru International Airport in Santa Cruz de la Sierra. It is the largest airline in Bolivia and sixth largest in South America, in terms of fleet size and passengers carried.

Boliviana de Aviación operates a fleet consisting of Airbus and Boeing aircraft and a regional fleet of Bombardier CRJ-200s. It currently flies to 21 destinations in 8 countries in the Americas together with a transatlantic extension to Madrid in Spain.

The airline was established as a state-owned enterprise as the successor airline of former flag carrier Lloyd Aéreo Boliviano, which ceased in 2007 after 85 years of operation. Following the demise of AeroSur, Bolivia's second largest airline, BoA became the country's sole main carrier in 2011. In November 2014, the airline became a full member of the International Air Transport Association.

== History ==
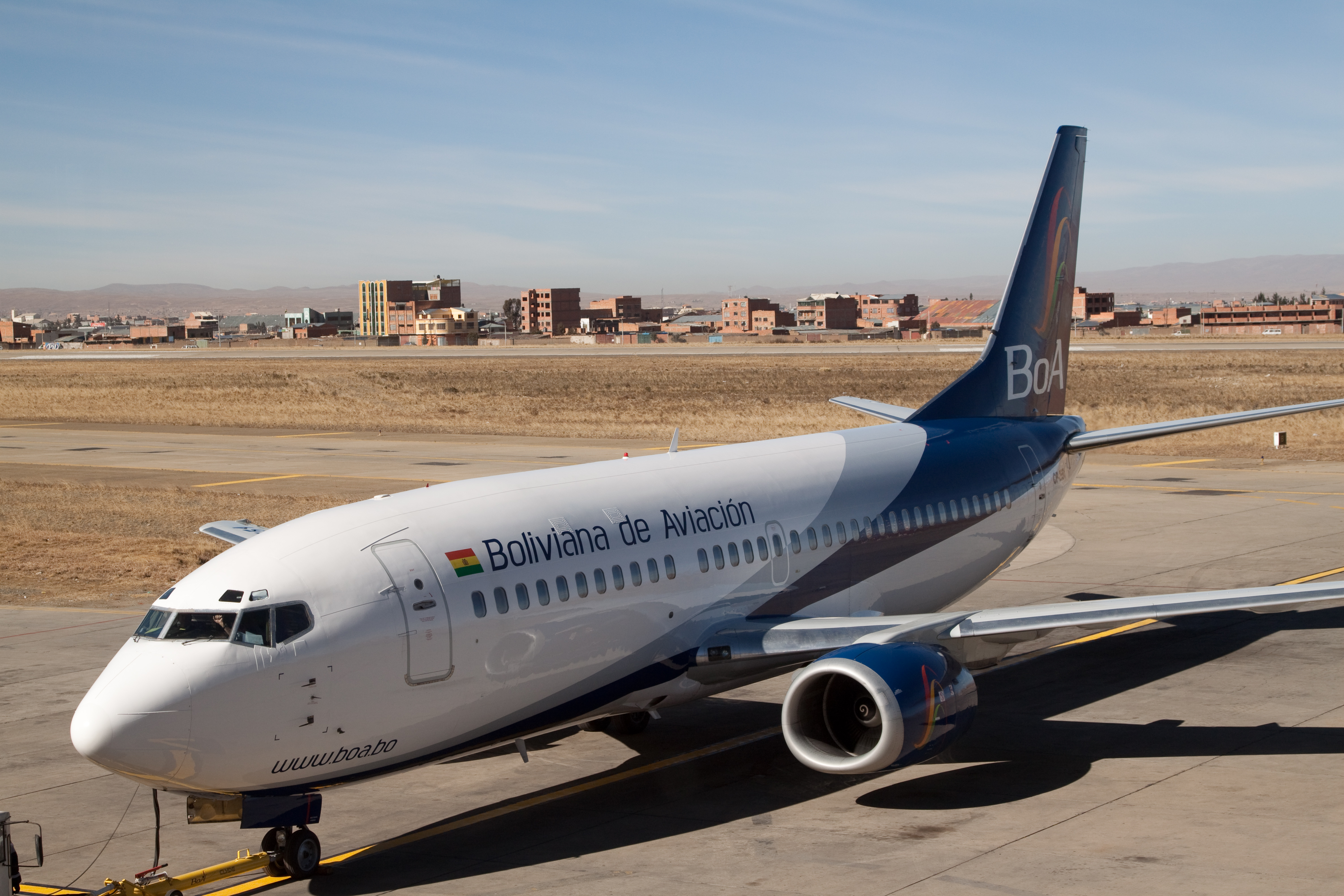
BoA's first Boeing 737-300 parked at El Alto International Airport

=== Background and early years ===
Boliviana de Aviación (BoA), was founded on 24 October 2007 by the Bolivian government under president Evo Morales, who signed Supreme Decree 29318 into law, establishing the new airline as a strategic state-owned enterprise with the purpose of sustaining the Bolivian air travel market, which had been left exposed during the downturn of Lloyd Aéreo Boliviano (LAB), the country's former flag carrier. The new airline would be under the supervision of the Ministry of Public Works, Services, and Housing.

Proposals from the Bolivian government to establish a new airline quickly became concrete in 2006 when LAB suspended much of its air routes due to financial difficulties and years of mismanagement. LAB had accumulated losses since 1995, at the time of its partial acquisition by Brazilian airline VASP. Its debts approached $180 million and in 2012, it formally ceased operations after 87 years of service. At the time of its demise, Lloyd Aéreo Boliviano was the second oldest airline in South America after Avianca.

On 29 March 2009, Boliviana de Aviación launched its first scheduled flight between the cities of La Paz, Cochabamba and Santa Cruz de la Sierra using one of the two Boeing 737-300 it acquired that same year. In 2012, BoA became the main airline in the country after the bankruptcy of AeroSur, Bolivia's second largest carrier.

=== Expansion ===
Three years after it started operations, Boliviana de Aviación extended its domestic network by adding services to the cities of Sucre and Tarija. In 2012, following the demise Bolivia's second largest airline, AeroSur, the airline became the principal carrier in the country and consolidated its network of scheduled domestic services, reaching the country's main centers of population. In addition to its domestic network, the airline operates scheduled international services to the South American countries of Argentina, Brazil, Paraguay, Peru and Venezuela. In May 2010, it inaugurated its first international flight from Cochabamba to Buenos Aires and in November 2010, it began services to São Paulo, its second international destination. The airline currently offers daily non-stop service to Buenos Aires and to São Paulo.

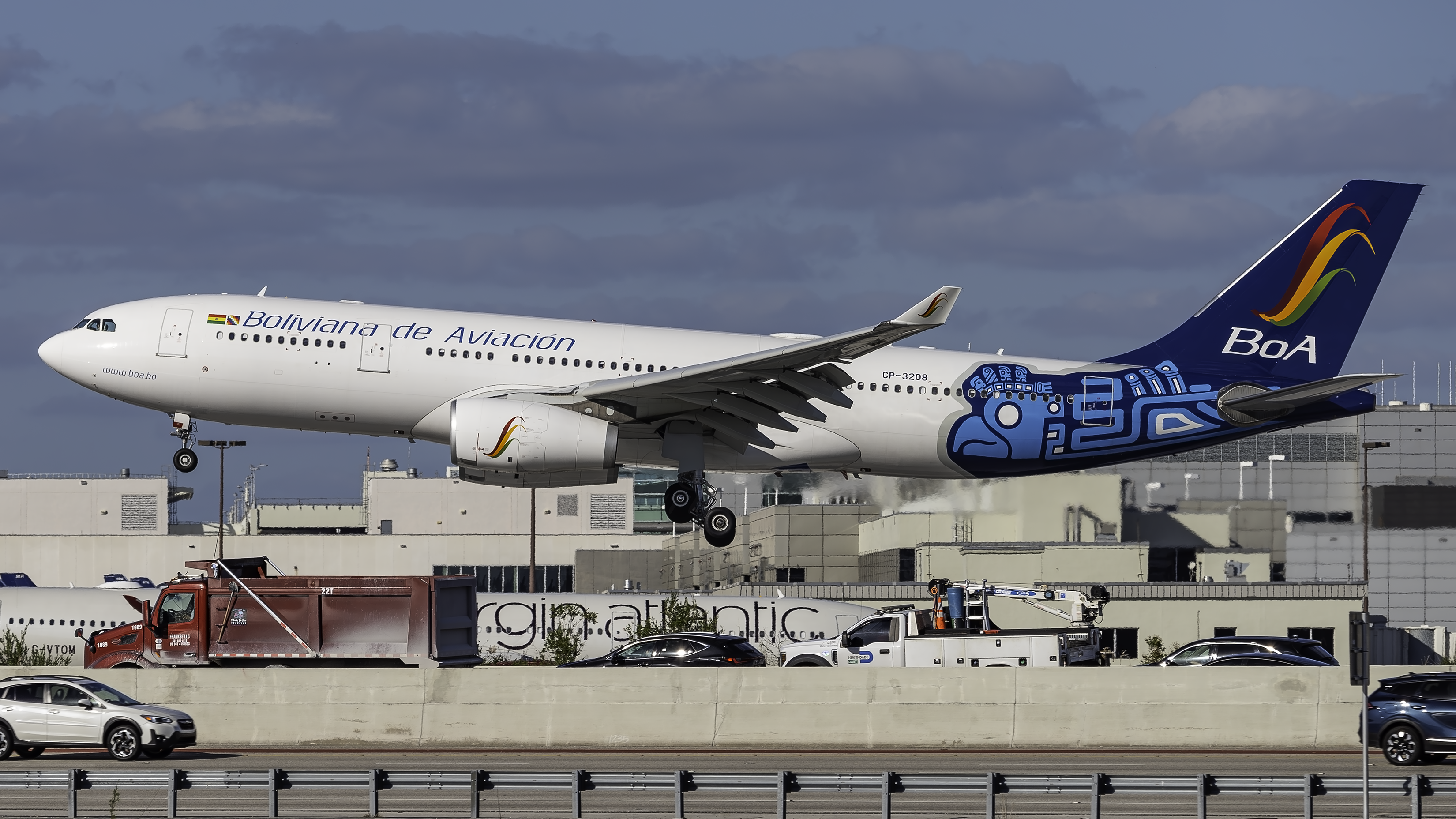
A Boliviana de Aviación Airbus A330-200 on short final to Miami International Airport

The airline subsequently leased a single Airbus A330 as its first long-haul aircraft to begin transatlantic services to Madrid in Spain. The first flight was made in November 2012 from Santa Cruz de la Sierra's Viru Viru International Airport to Madrid–Barajas Airport. The airline later retired the Airbus A330 and in 2014, it leased a total of 4 Boeing 767-300ERs to increase frequencies to its Madrid service and began daily non-stop flights to Miami in the United States that same year. On February 8th, 2022, the airline began service to Lima, Peru, On October 26th 2023, the airline started scheduled services to Havana in Cuba using a Boeing 737-800. However, the airline has suspended its services to Havana in July 2024, just 9 months since its inaugural flight, due to low demand and high operating costs. On November 3rd 2023, it launched its new destination to Caracas, Venezuela and on January 18th 2024, it began service to Asunción in Paraguay.

As part of its fleet modernization program, the airline started to gradually replace its fleet of Boeing 737-300 for modern Boeing 737 Next Generation aircraft. In April 2023, Boliviana de Aviación took delivery of its first Airbus A330-200 for its long-haul services from Santa Cruz de la Sierra, to Miami and Madrid. The airline currently has three aircraft of the type in its fleet, replacing the aging Boeing 767-300ER. The newer aircraft feature lie-flat seats in business class and improved services in economy class featuring In-flight entertainment screens in every seat. The airline is also currently modernizing the interior seats of its Boeing 737 aircraft by installing newer Mirus Hawk seats.

== Business figures ==
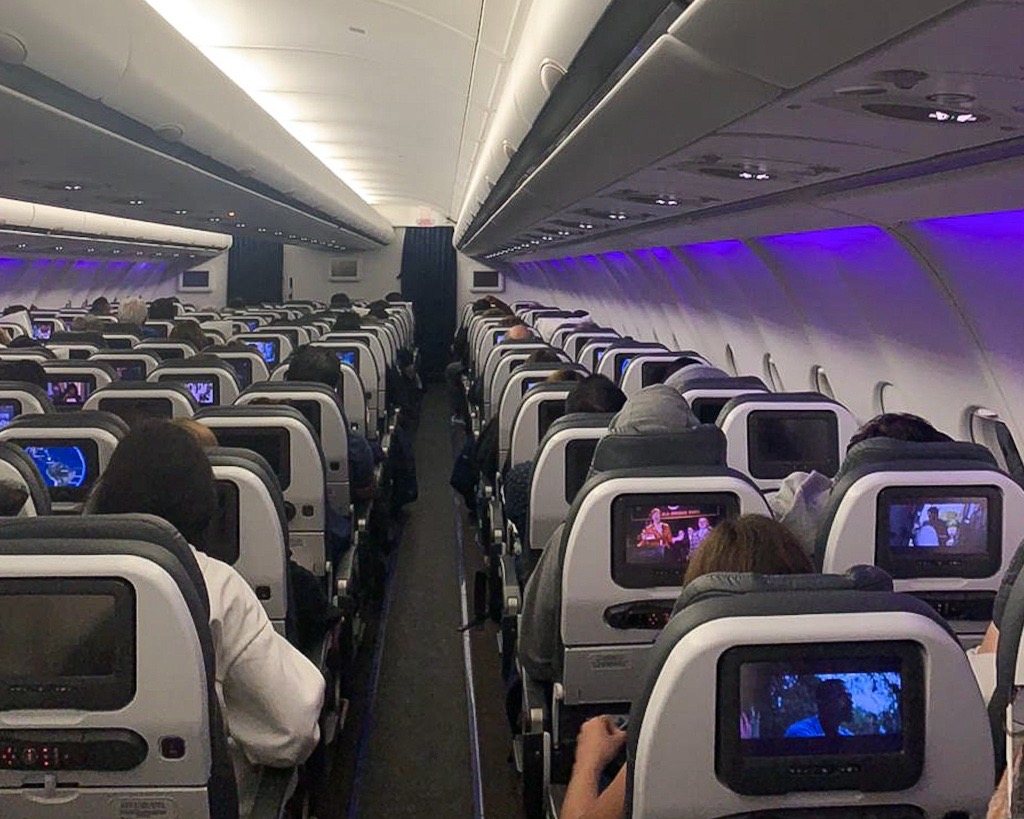
International economy class cabin on a BoA Airbus A330-200

On 29 March 2009, Boliviana of Aviación (BoA) made its inaugural flight. To almost a year of the fact, the participation of the state company in the regular aeronautical market came to a close of 50% and utilities to some US$2.2 million. Some domestic networks have been dominated by the services of BoA. Most of the airline's financial success is due to the 10% reduction of all its fares in domestic flights compared with AeroSur.

Since 2010, the airline began taking leadership in some domestic routes, in decline of the private flag carrier AeroSur. According to the Authority of Inspection and Social control of Transport and Telecommunications (ATT), Boliviana de Aviación achieved the passengers' biggest quantity in three routes:

- Cochabamba-Cobija (64%)
- Cochabamba-Sucre (73%)
- Cochabamba-Tarija (93%)

== Destinations ==
Boliviana de Aviación's main hub is in Cochabamba at Jorge Wilstermann International Airport, located in the center of the country. As such, most of the domestic network is operated out of Cochabamba. The airline also maintains two focus cities in La Paz and Santa Cruz de la Sierra. All international flights within South America as well as long-haul services to Madrid and Miami operate out of Viru Viru International Airport in Santa Cruz de la Sierra due to the airport's low altitude compared to La Paz's El Alto International Airport.

=== Codeshare and interline agreements ===
Boliviana de Aviación has codeshare and Interline agreements with the following airlines:

==== Codeshare ====
- Aerolíneas Argentinas
- Avianca
- Iberia

==== Interline ====
- Emirates
- Hahn Air

== Fleet ==
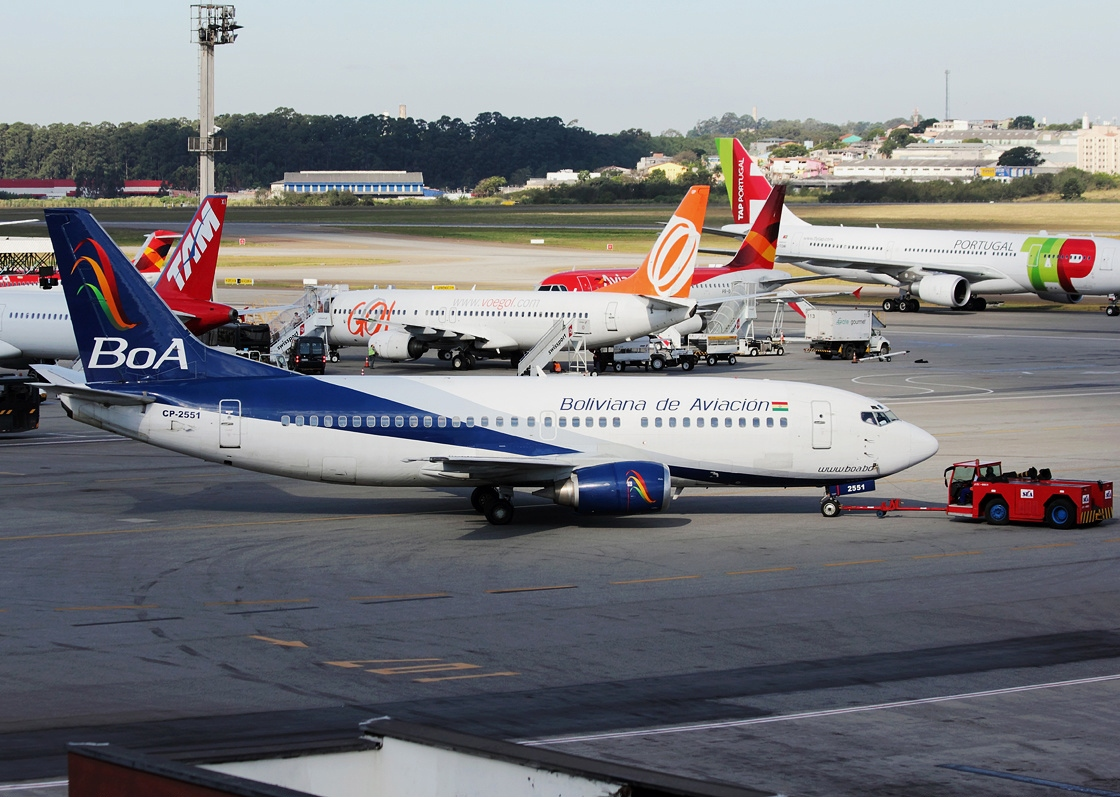
Boeing 737-300

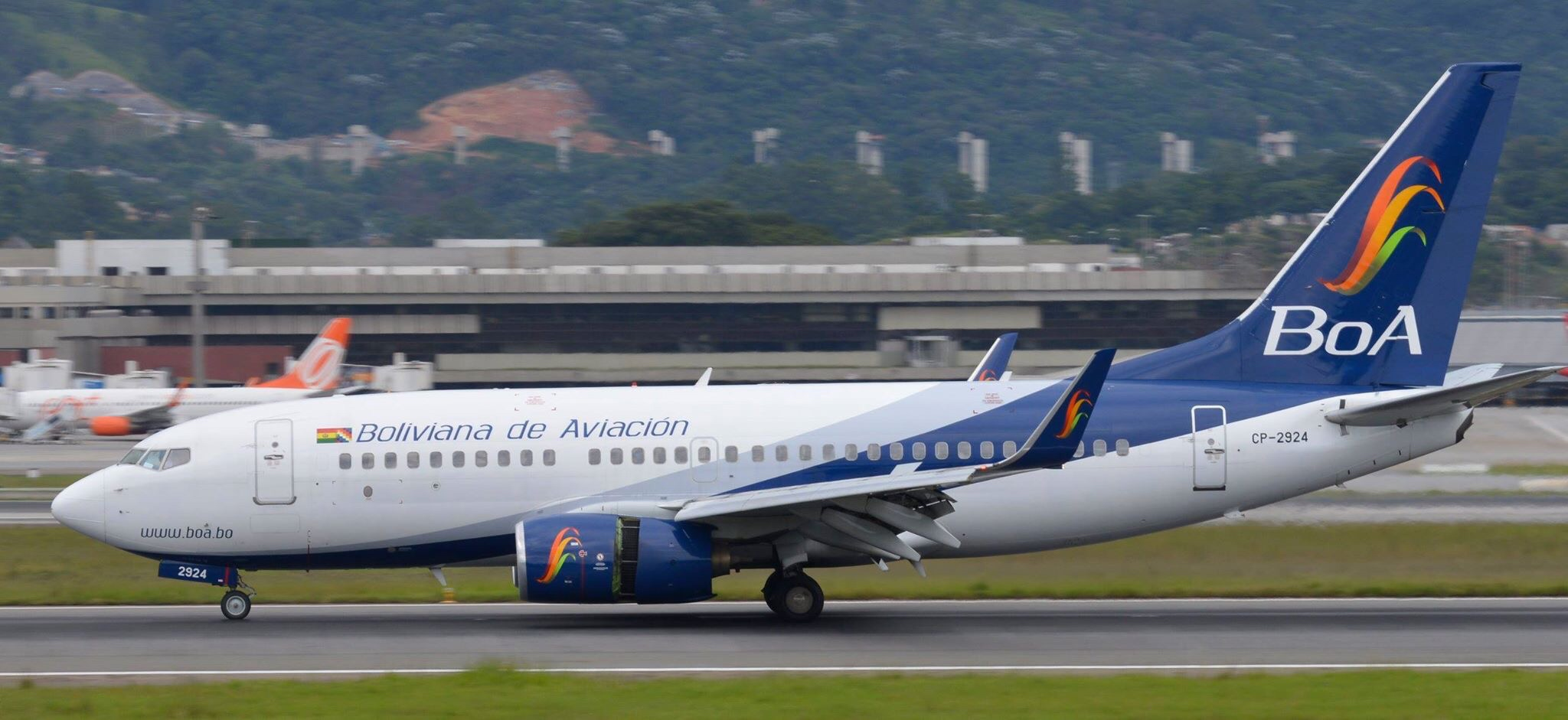
Boeing 737-700

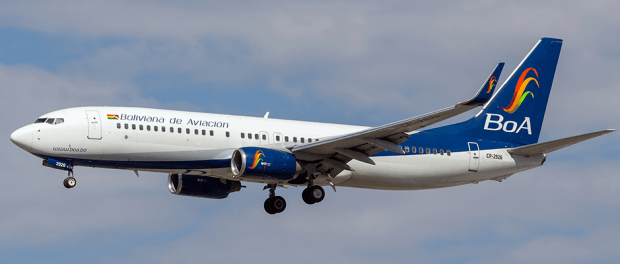
Boeing 737-800

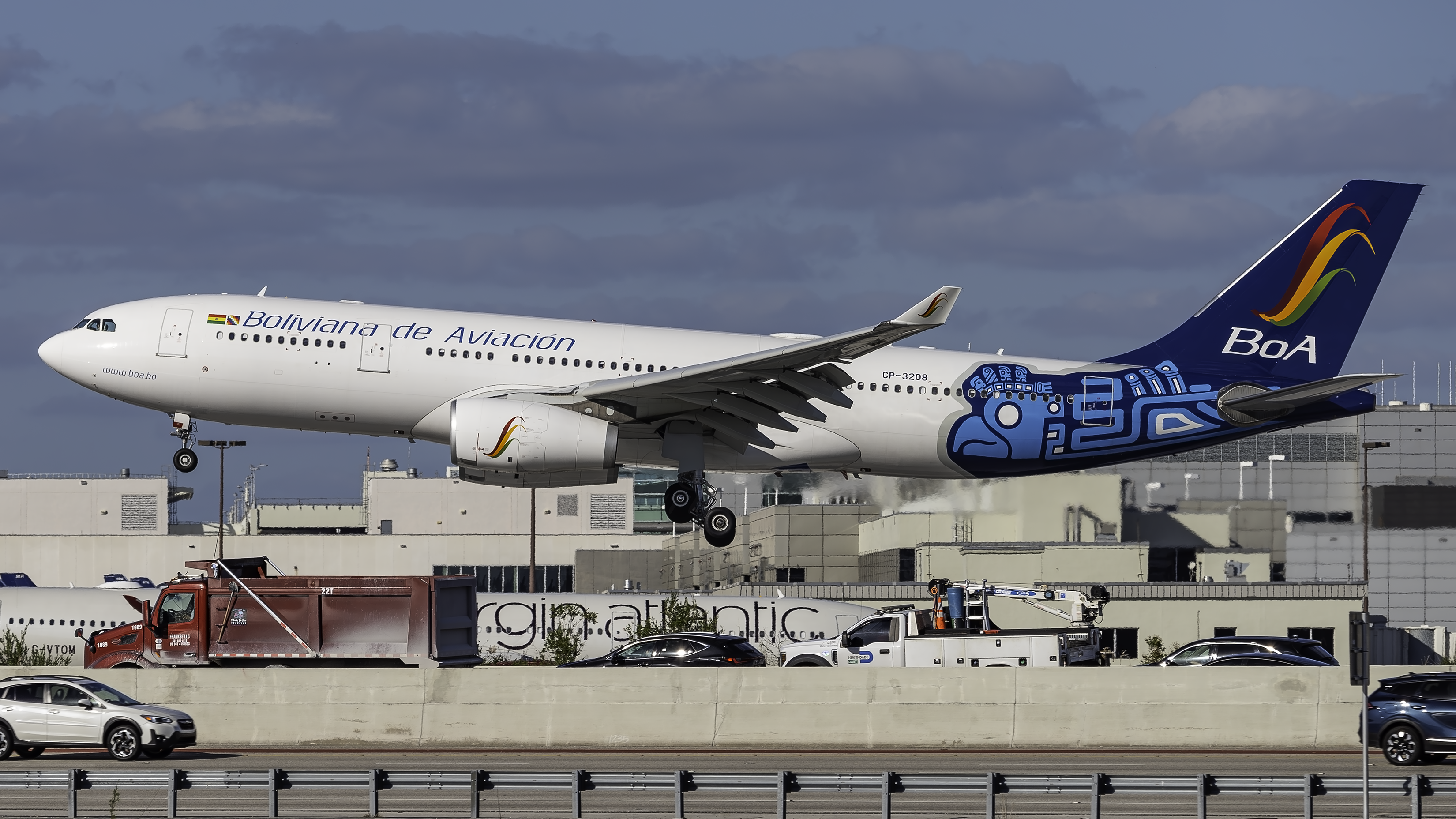
Airbus A330-200

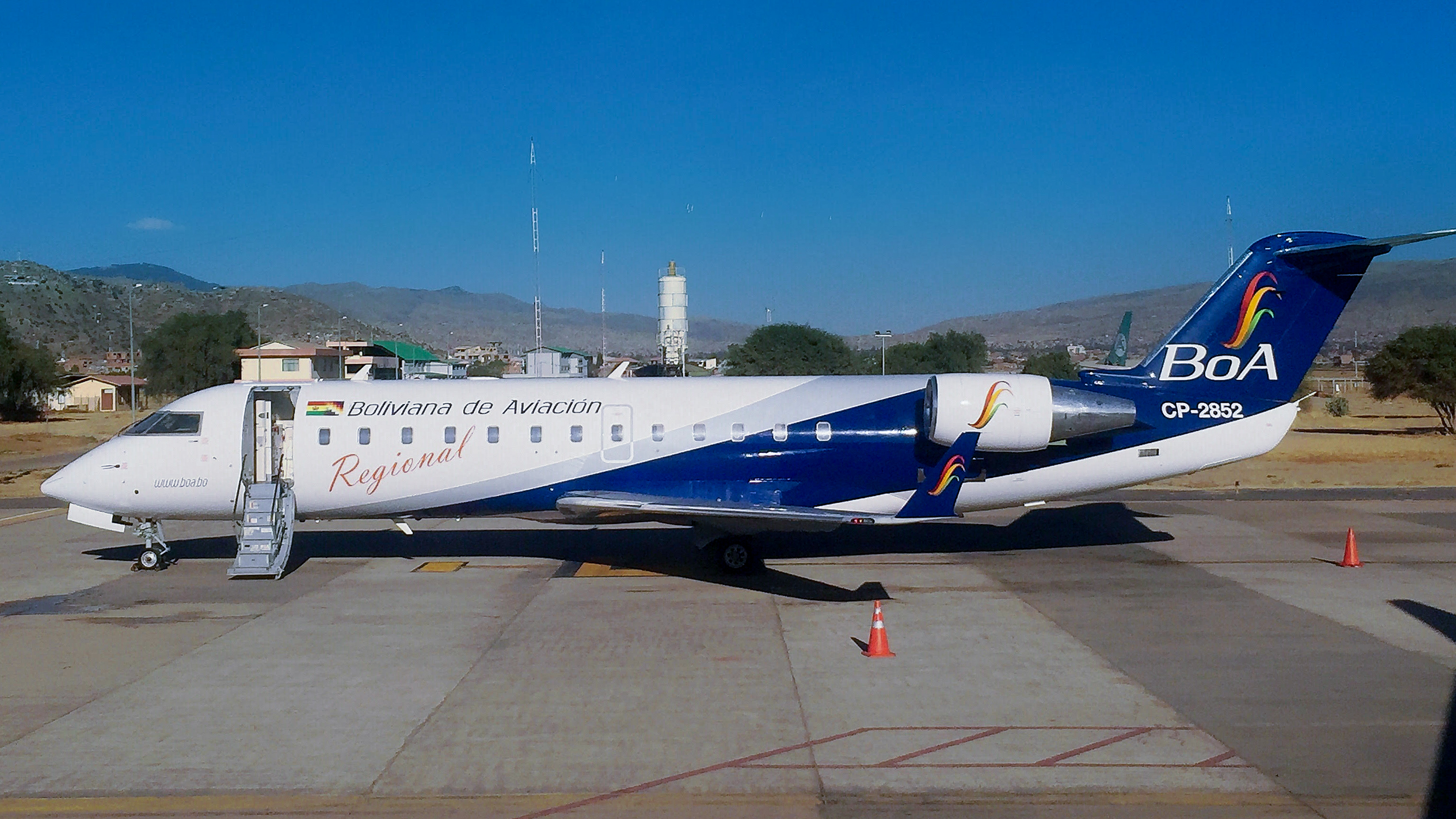
Bombardier CRJ200

=== Current fleet ===
As of January 2026, Boliviana de Aviación operates the following aircraft:

Boliviana de Aviación fleet
Aircraft	In fleet	Orders	Passengers			Notes
Aircraft	In fleet	Orders	C	Y	Total	Notes
Airbus A330-200	3	—	20	255	275	
Boeing 737-300	2	—	—	136	136	
Boeing 737-700	3	—	–	138	138	
Boeing 737-800	7	—	–	168	168	
Bombardier CRJ200	2	—	–	50	50	Returned to service in 2024.
Total	17	—				

=== Former fleet ===
Since its inception, Boliviana de Aviación has operated the following aircraft:

Boliviana de Aviación former fleet
Aircraft	Total	Introduced	Retired	Notes
Boeing 737-500	1	2013	2015	
Boeing 767-200ER	1	2013	2014	Leased from Omni Air International
Boeing 767-300ER	4	2014	2024	Replaced by Airbus A330-200

=== Fleet development ===
Boliviana de Aviación started operations with two Boeing 737-300s. On 29 September 2009, BoA announced the arrival of its 3rd Boeing 737. On 14 April 2010, BoA received its 4th Boeing 737. In April 2011, BoA received its 5th Boeing 737. President Evo Morales celebrated the new acquisition and emphasized the positive results in the coverage of the internal market. On 14 September 2014, BoA announced the arrival of its first Boeing 767-300ER. On May 4 2023, BoA acquired its first two Airbus A330-200s as part of the airline's long-haul fleet modernization program. The Airbus A330 aircraft replaced the older Boeing 767-300ERs.

In 2013, the Bolivian Government and the Russian ambassador were negotiating the acquisition of the Antonov An-148 for official and civil uses. Bolivia was interested in acquiring eight planes, one as the presidential carrier and seven to the state-owned airlines which are Boliviana de Aviación and Transporte Aéreo Militar. According to the negotiation, BoA would have received four planes and TAM three planes of this type. However, the negotiation depended on the cooperative advances between the Bolivian and Russian governments as regards a credit for US$250 million. Such plan has been postponed/canceled due to economic and technical unviability. In 2018, the Federal Service for Supervision of Transport grounded all Antonov An-148 aircraft citing safety concerns.

== See also ==
- List of airlines of Bolivia
