= El Alto International Airport =

Airport serving La Paz, Bolivia

El Alto International Airport Aeropuerto Internacional El Alto
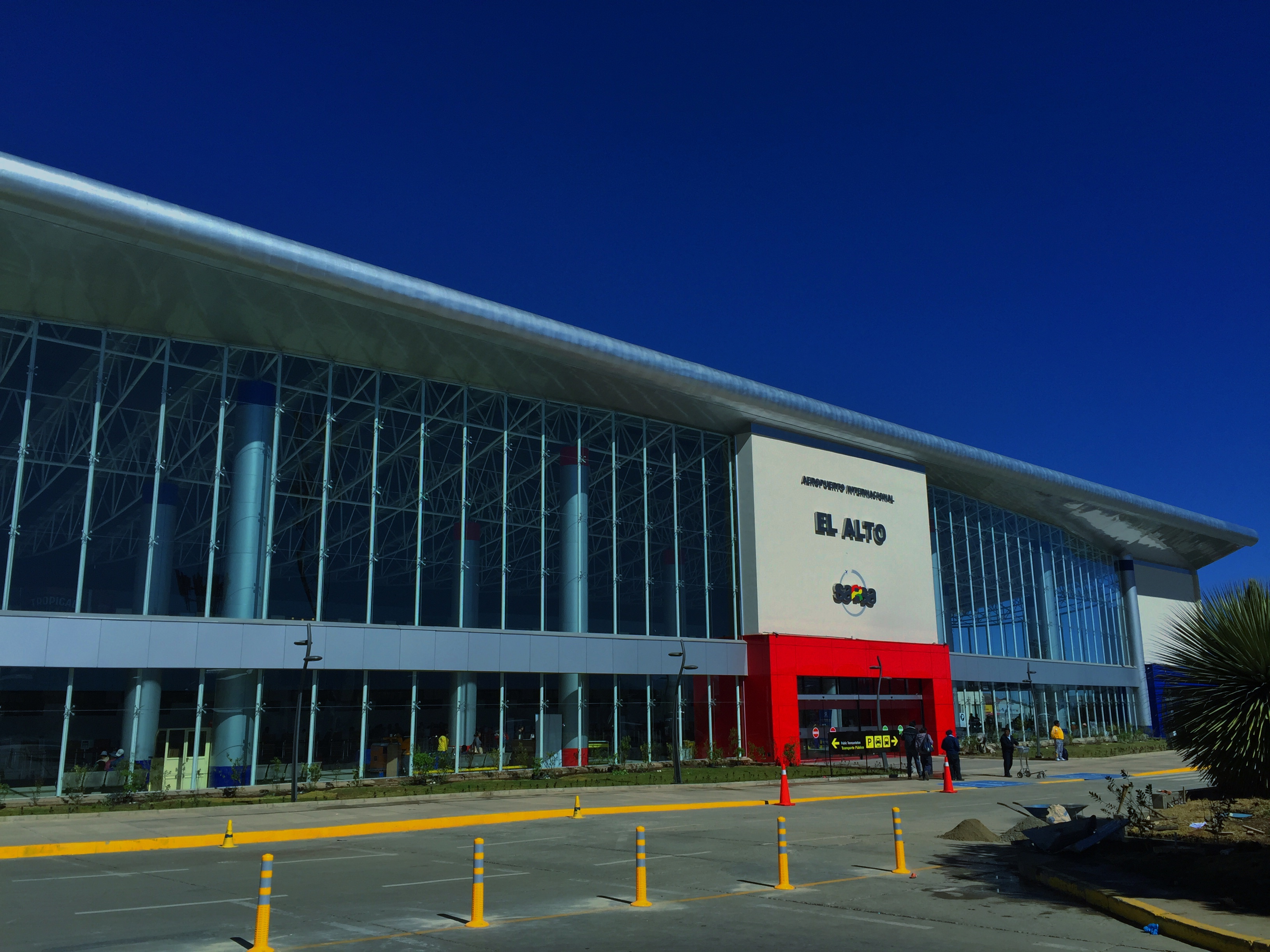
- Main terminal
- IATA: LPB; ICAO: SLLP; WMO: 85201

Summary
- Airport type: Public / Military
- Owner: Government of Bolivia
- Operator: Navegación Aérea y Aeropuertos Bolivianos (NAABOL)
- Serves: La Paz, Bolivia
- Location: El Alto, Bolivia
- Opened: 18 June 1965; 61 years ago
- Focus city for: Boliviana de Aviación
- Elevation AMSL: 4,061.5 m (13,325 ft)
- Coordinates: 16°30′48″S 068°11′32″W
- Website: https://naabol.gob.bo/aeropuerto-internacional-el-alto/

Map
- Location of airport in Bolivia

Runways
| Direction | Length | | Surface |
| Direction | m | ft | Surface |
|---|---|---|---|
| 10R/28L | 4,000 | 13,123 | Asphalt |
| 10L/28R | 2,050 | 6,725 | Grass |

Statistics (2023)
- Passengers: 2,607,457
- Source: SABSA, Airport Statistics

El Alto International Airport (Spanish: Aeropuerto Internacional El Alto) (IATA: LPB, ICAO: SLLP) is an international airport serving La Paz, Bolivia. It is located in the city of El Alto, 13 kilometres (8 mi) west of La Paz. At an elevation of 4,061.5 metres (13,325 ft), it is the highest international airport in the world, the seventh highest commercial airport in the world and the highest commercial airport outside of China.

The airport has been in service since the first half of the 20th century, but was modernized in the late 1960s, when its runway was lengthened and a new passenger terminal with modern facilities was built. The new airport was inaugurated in 1965. El Alto airport was a primary hub for the former Lloyd Aéreo Boliviano, Bolivia's flag carrier which ceased operations in 2007. It serves also as a focus city for Boliviana de Aviación, Bolivia's flag carrier and state-owned airline.

== History ==
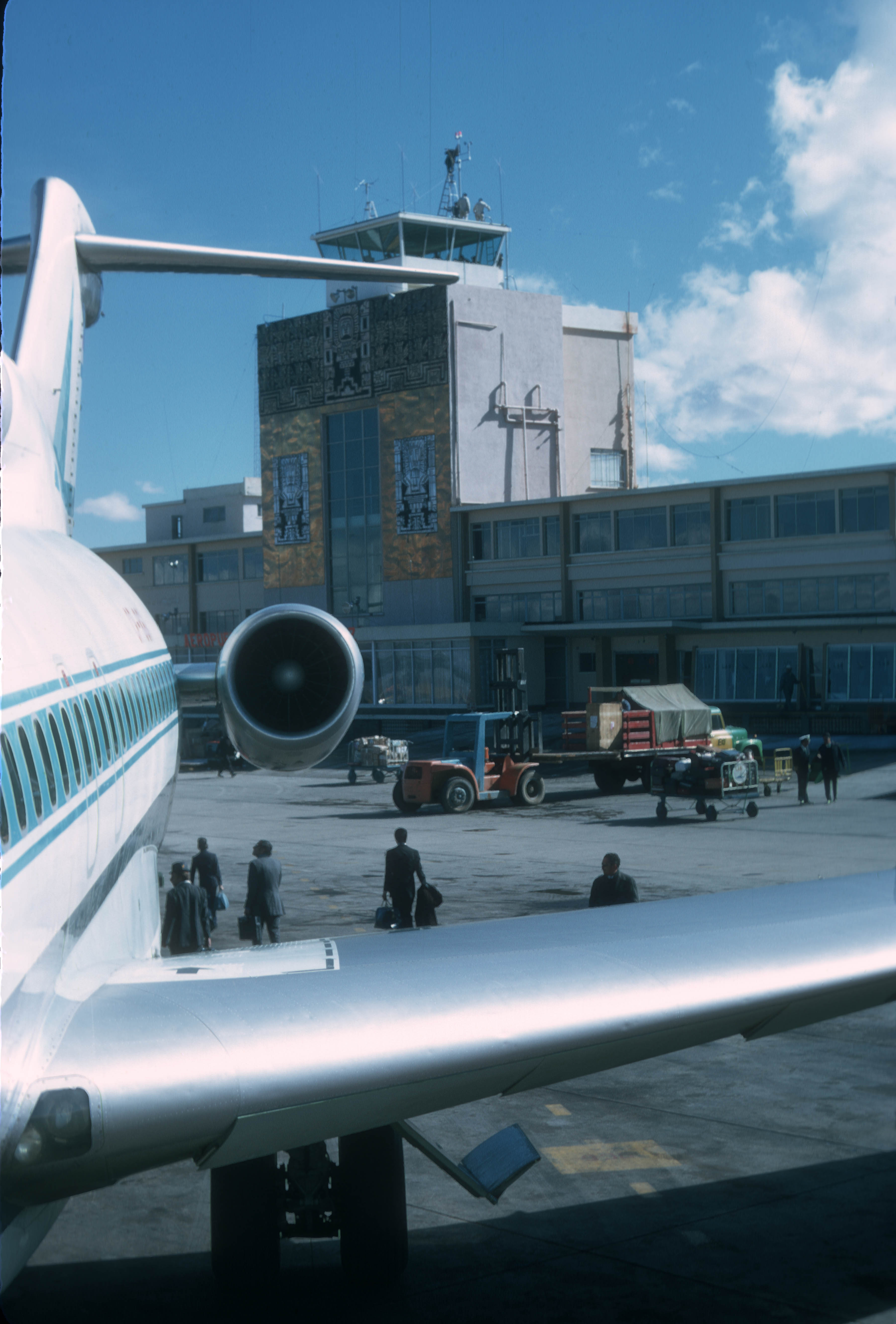
The airport during the 1960s. A LAB Boeing 727 is seen in the foreground with the old terminal and its iconic Tiwanakotan façade in the background.

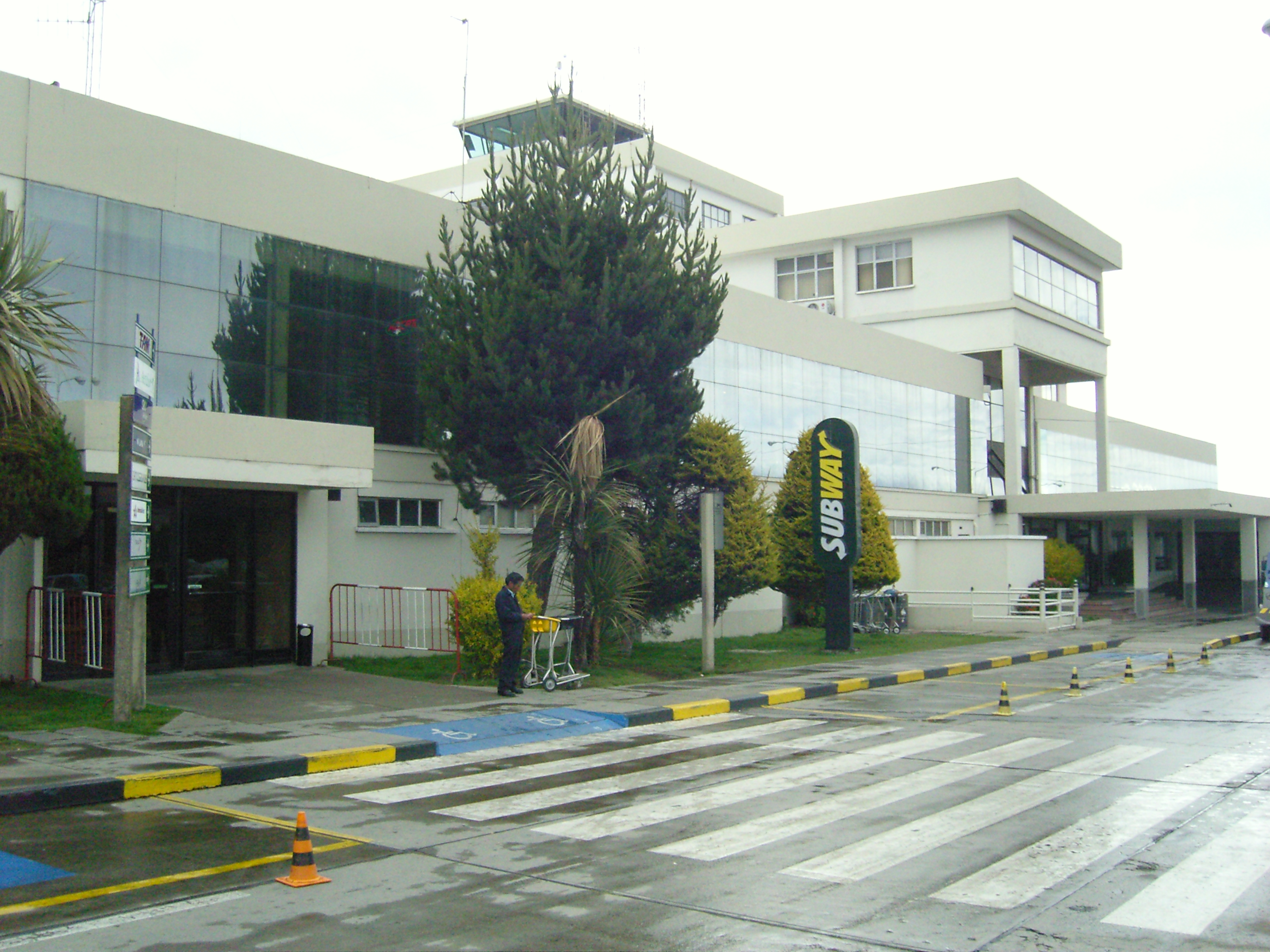
Old terminal

Bolivia is characterized by an extremely varied terrain including rugged mountains, high plateaus, low valleys and tropical forests; this topography has had a negative effect on national transportation, making communication difficult between elevated and low cities along with isolated tropical towns. Aviation is an important means of access for isolated communities in this environment.

Bolivian air transport started in 1916, when the Military School of Aviation (Spanish: Escuela Militar de Aviación) was formed in La Paz. In 1929, the local La Paz Government first planned the construction of an airport; however, it was not officially inaugurated until the 1960s. In 1974, the airport was reconstructed, a new terminal was built, and its facilities were enlarged and modernized.

Until 1999, the airport had John F. Kennedy (JFK) as its official name, although in practice this name was never publicly used. In that year, before the pressure of different sectors, by means of the Law 1944 during the government of Hugo Banzer Suárez, the airport changed its name officially to El Alto International Airport.

=== Modernization ===
In 2006, SABSA (Spanish: Servicios Aeroportuarios Bolivianos S.A.) invested nearly 2.3 million dollars in the reconstruction of the main terminal. The new terminal consists of the enlargement, reshaping and construction of the baggage claim room, the check-in area and the corridor to the air bridges. The administrative offices of AASANA as well as the main hall and the international area were completely modernized.

== Characteristics ==
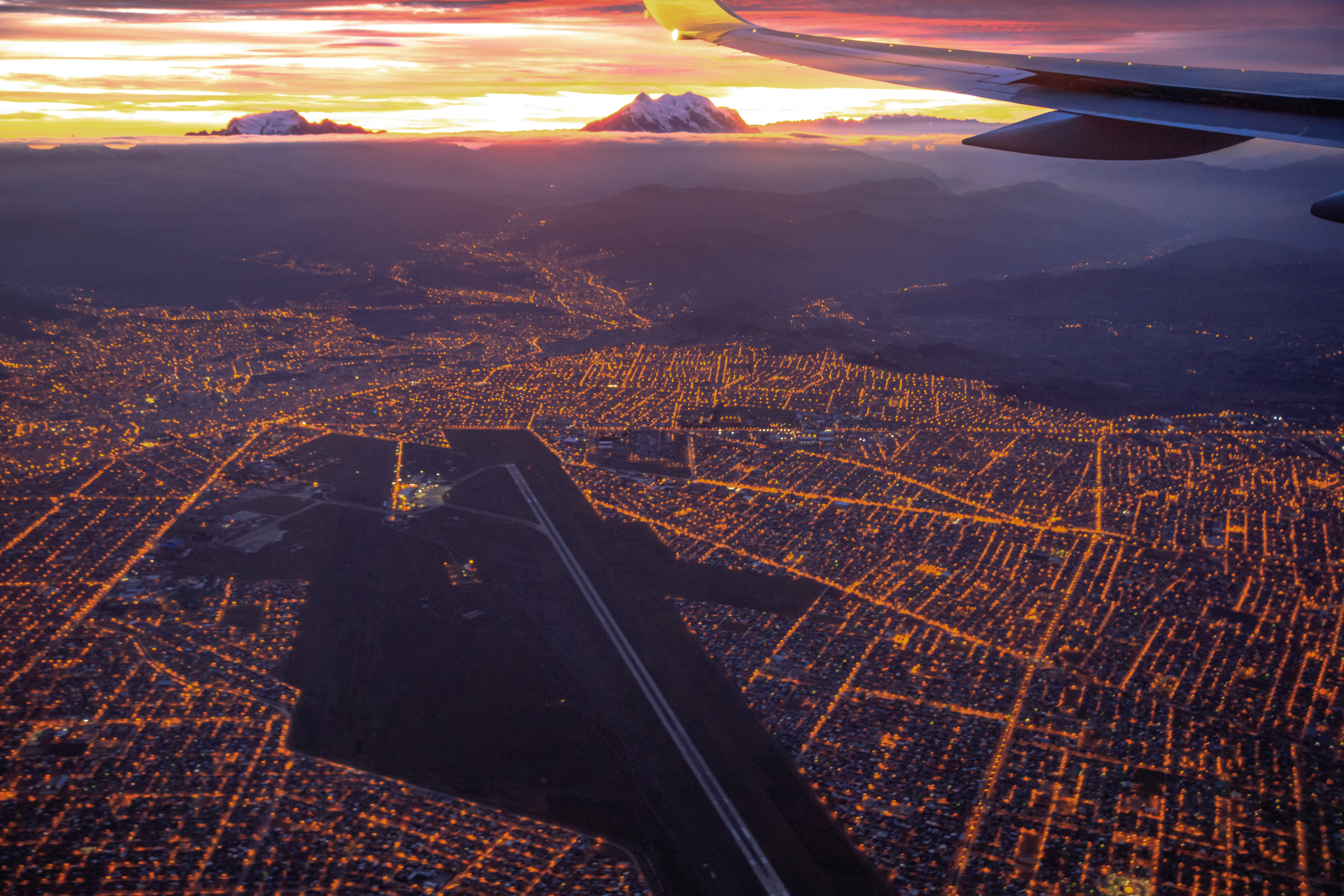
At more than 4,000 m (13,000 ft) above sea level, El Alto is the highest international airport in the world

The new terminal includes various shops offering Bolivian handicrafts as well as bookstores and duty-free shops. There are also restaurants and cafes in the main lobby and in both domestic and international departure areas.

The airport has two runways: The main one "10R/28L" has a concrete surface and is 4,000 metres (13,123 ft) long, allowing large aircraft operations at higher altitudes. A second runway, "10L/28R" is located parallel to the main runway and has a grass surface. The airport is equipped with VOR/DME, DVOR/DME navigation systems, as well as ILS CAT I approach systems.

El Alto is the world's highest international airport, located at 4,062 metres (13,327 ft) above sea level. The average temperature at the airport is 6 °C (43 °F). Because of the thin high altitude air, most commercial wide-body aircraft such as the Boeing 747 and Airbus A330 cannot operate at full load out of El Alto International Airport. As a result, much of the international traffic to and from Bolivia operates out of Viru Viru International Airport in Santa Cruz de la Sierra which is located at a much lower elevation, allowing heavy aircraft operations.

=== Flight testing ===
As one of the world's highest-elevation airports, El Alto offers features taken advantage of by aircraft manufacturers such as Airbus, Bombardier, and Boeing to test high-altitude takeoff and landing. Modern aircraft such as the Airbus A350 XWB, Airbus A330neo and Boeing 787 Dreamliner have used El Alto to perform flight tests for their certification processes.

== Operators ==
From 1997, the airport was managed by TBI plc which owned concessions of the three biggest airports in the country: El Alto International Airport, Jorge Wilstermann International Airport and Viru Viru International Airport through its subsidiary Servicio de Aeropuertos Bolivianos S.A. (SABSA). In 1999 Airport Group International was purchased by TBI plc. In 2004, the company was acquired by the Spanish conglomerate Abertis, hence taking ownership of SABSA. In February 2013, the Government of Bolivia announced the nationalization of SABSA, taking full ownership and operations of Bolivia's main international gateways.

SABSA has been substituted in March 2022 by the newly established government agency Navegación Aérea y Aeropuertos Bolivianos (NAABOL).

== Airlines and destinations ==
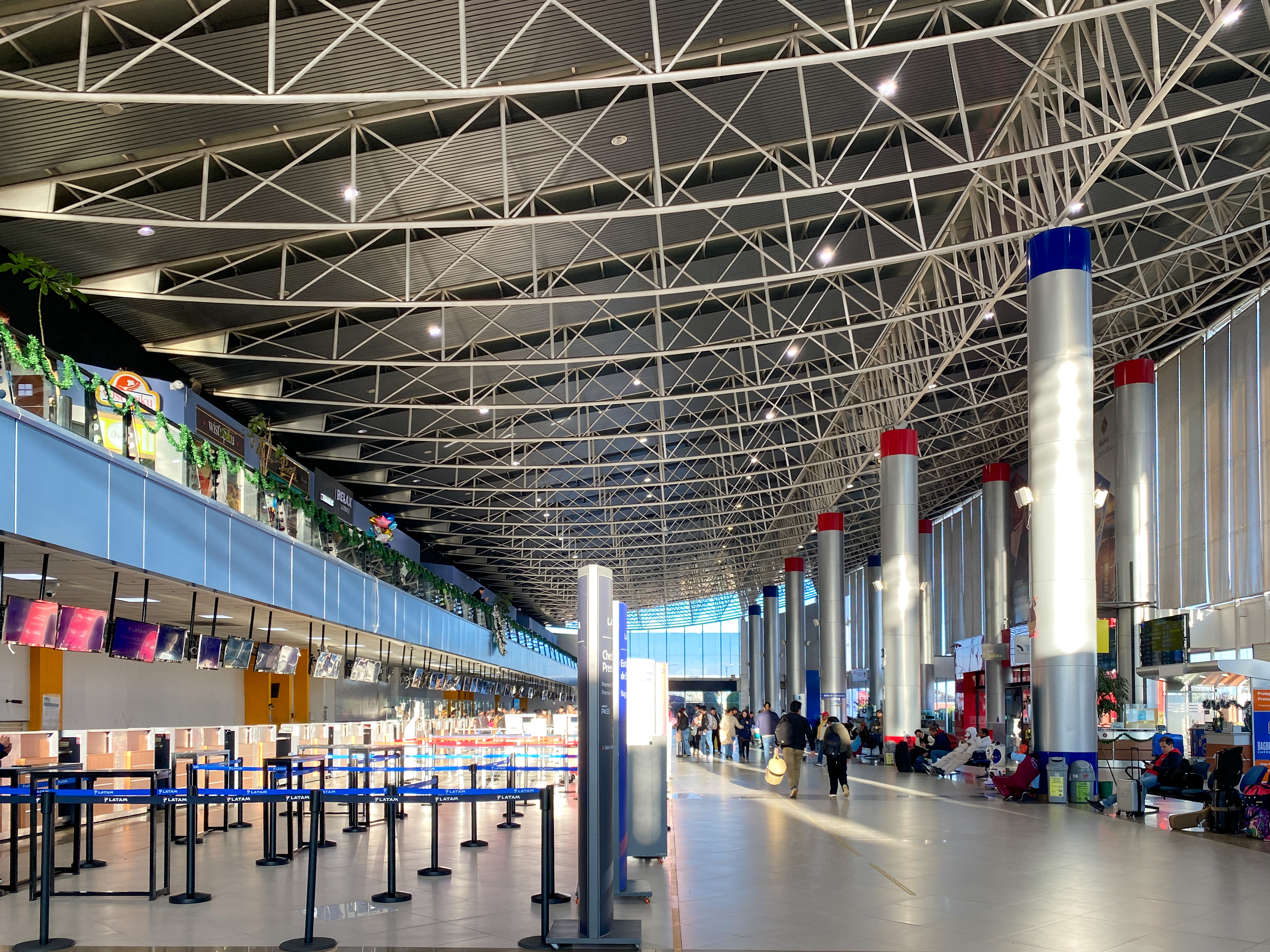
The airport's departures hall

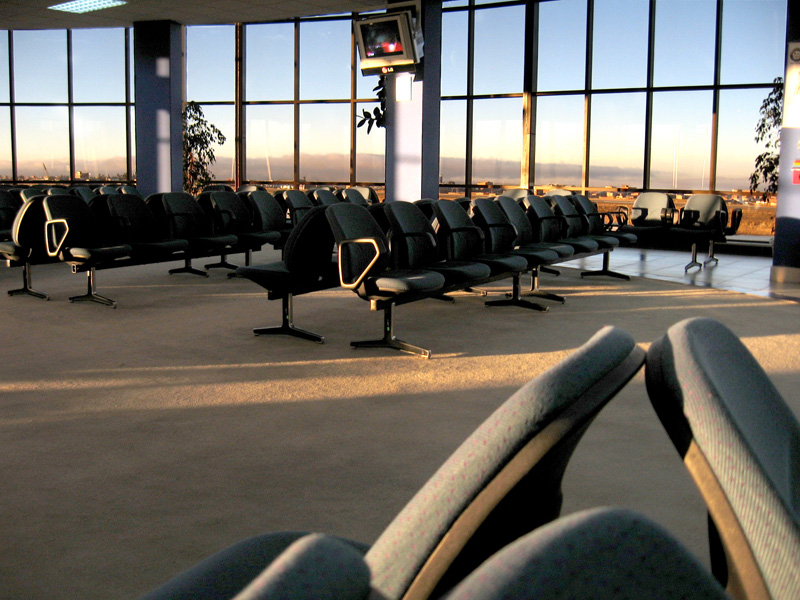
Domestic departures and waiting area in the old terminal.

| Airlines | Destinations |
|---|---|
| Avianca | Bogotá, Cusco |
| Boliviana de Aviación | Cobija, Cochabamba, Iquique, Lima, Santa Cruz de la Sierra–Viru Viru, Santiago de Chile, Sucre, Tarija, Uyuni |
| EcoJet | Cobija, Cochabamba, Rurrenabaque, Santa Cruz, Trinidad |
| LATAM Chile | Santiago de Chile |
| LATAM Perú | Lima |
| TAMep | Cobija, Cochabamba, Santa Cruz de la Sierra–Viru Viru |

== Accidents and incidents ==
- On 14 July 1970, Douglas DC-3 TAM-17 of TAM – Transporte Aéreo Militar was damaged beyond repair in an accident.
- On 4 May 1971, Douglas C-47 TAM-22 of TAM – Transporte Aéreo Militar crashed shortly after take-off on a cargo flight to El Jovi Airport.
- On 17 September 1972, Douglas C-47A CP-565 of Aerolíneas Abaroa crashed on take-off. The aircraft was operating a non-scheduled passenger flight. All four people on board survived.
- On 18 August 1974, a C-141 Starlifter impacted a mountain during approach. All seven crew members were killed.
- On 25 November 1976, Douglas C-47 CP-755 of Aerolíneas La Paz was damaged beyond economic repair in a landing accident. The aircraft was on a cargo flight, all four people on board survived.
- On 1 January 1985, Eastern Air Lines Flight 980 from Asuncion hit Mount Illimani during its descent towards El Alto, killing all 29 people on board the Boeing 727-225; the flight was scheduled to continue to Lima, Guayaquil, Panama City, Miami, and Chicago.
- On 27 February 2026, a C-130 Hercules aircraft of the Bolivian Air Force overshot the airport's runway during landing and collided with several vehicles, killing at least 22 people and injuring 29 others.

== See also ==
- List of airports in Bolivia
- List of highest commercial airports

Records
| Preceded by Cusco Airport | World's highest airport 4,061 m (13,323 ft); 1965–1994 | Succeeded by Qamdo Bamda Airport |
