= Cobija =

- City
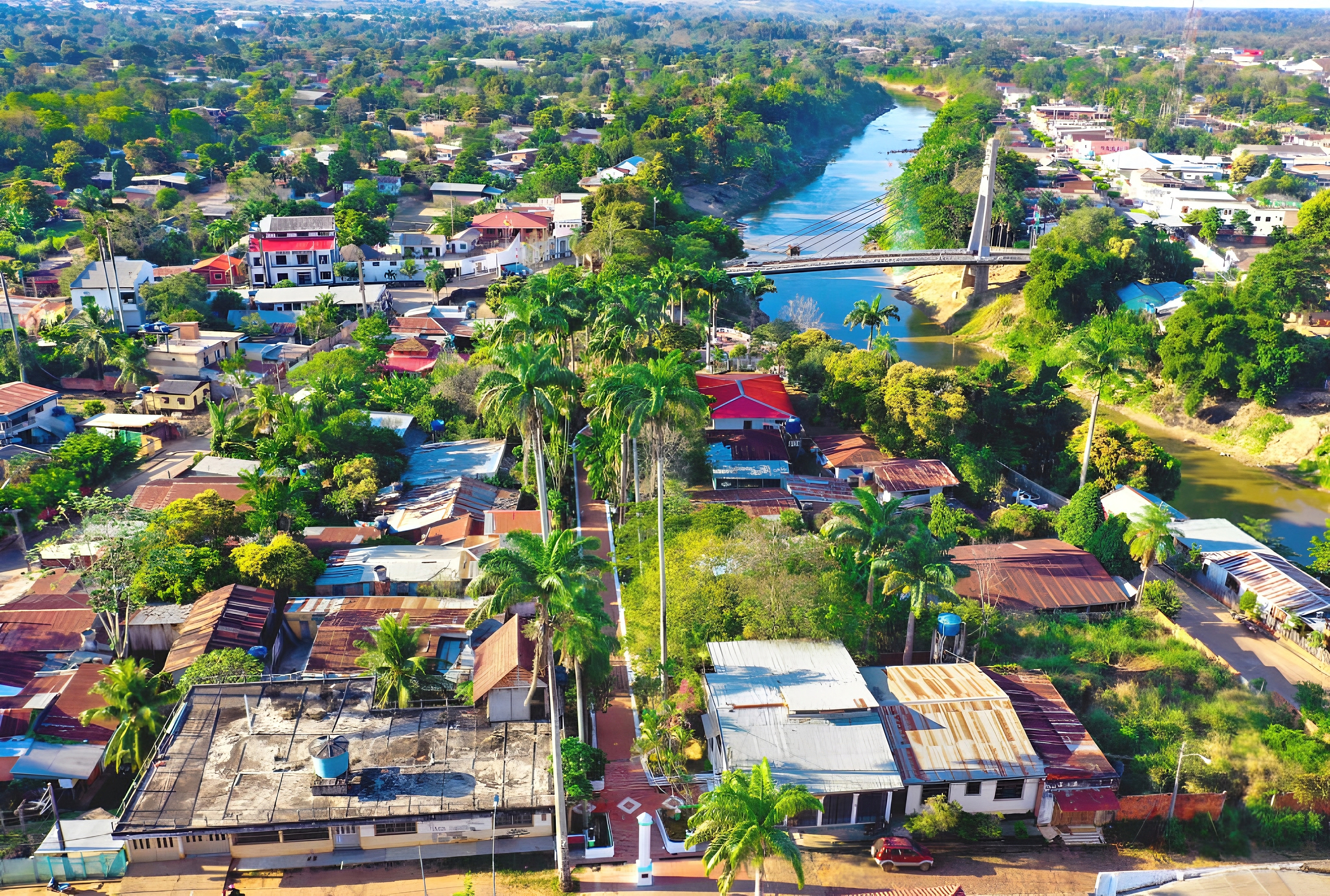
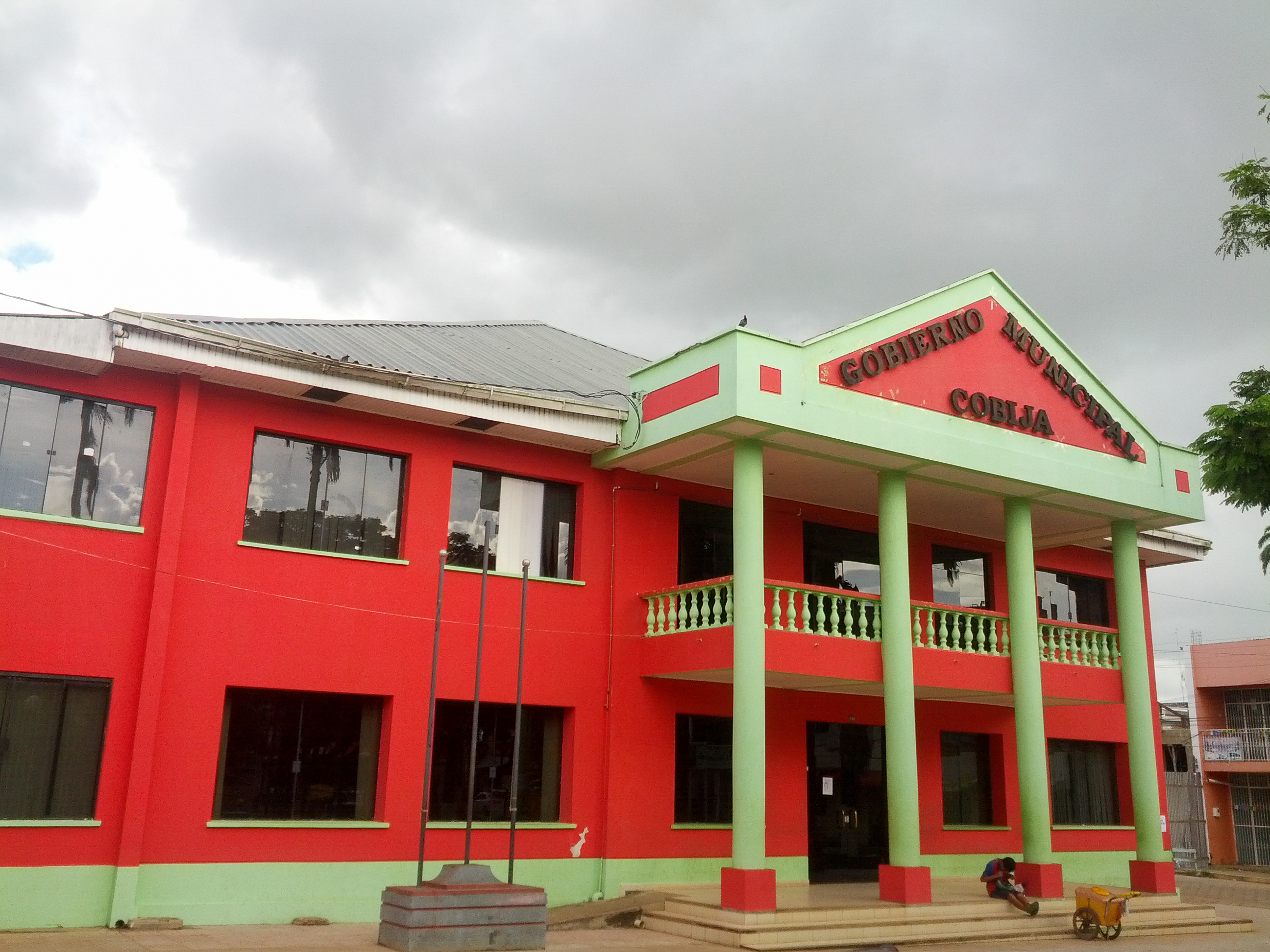
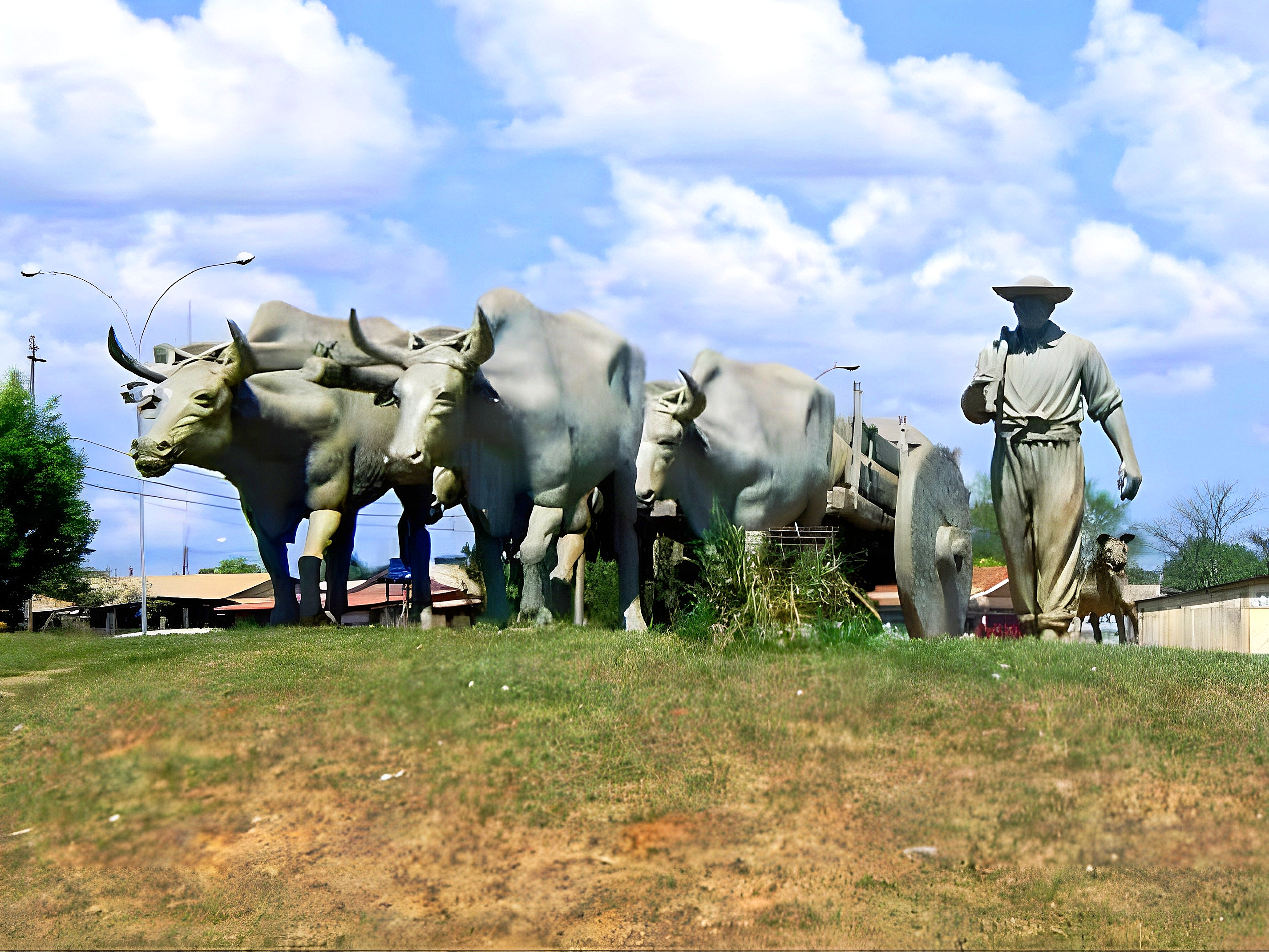
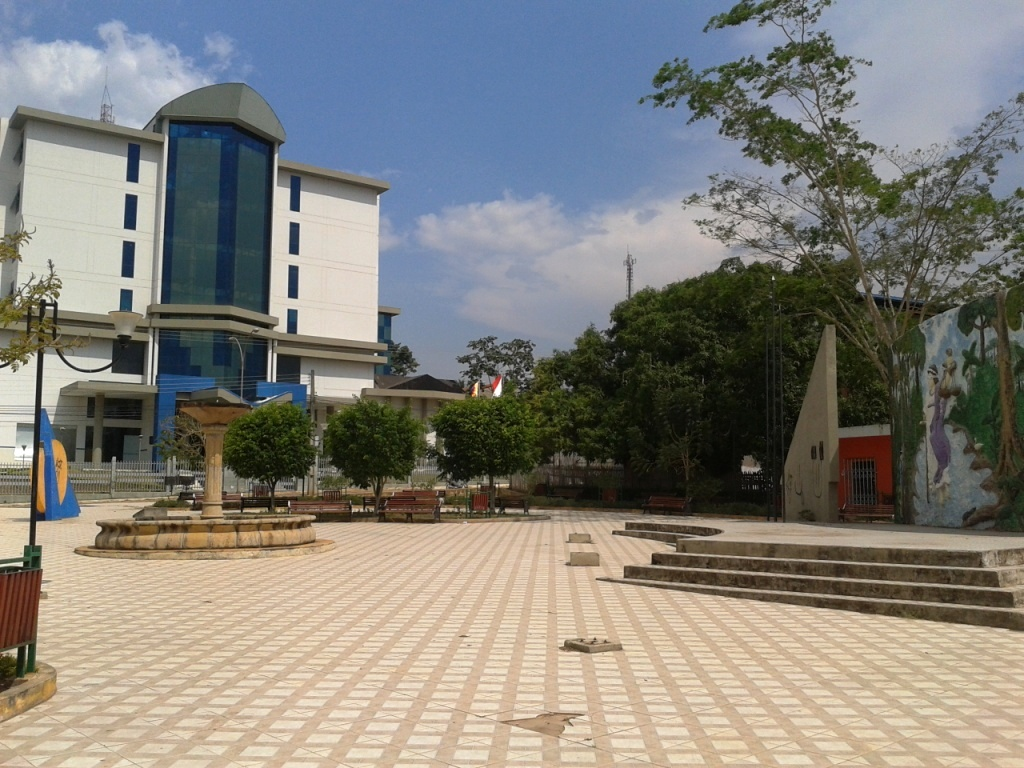
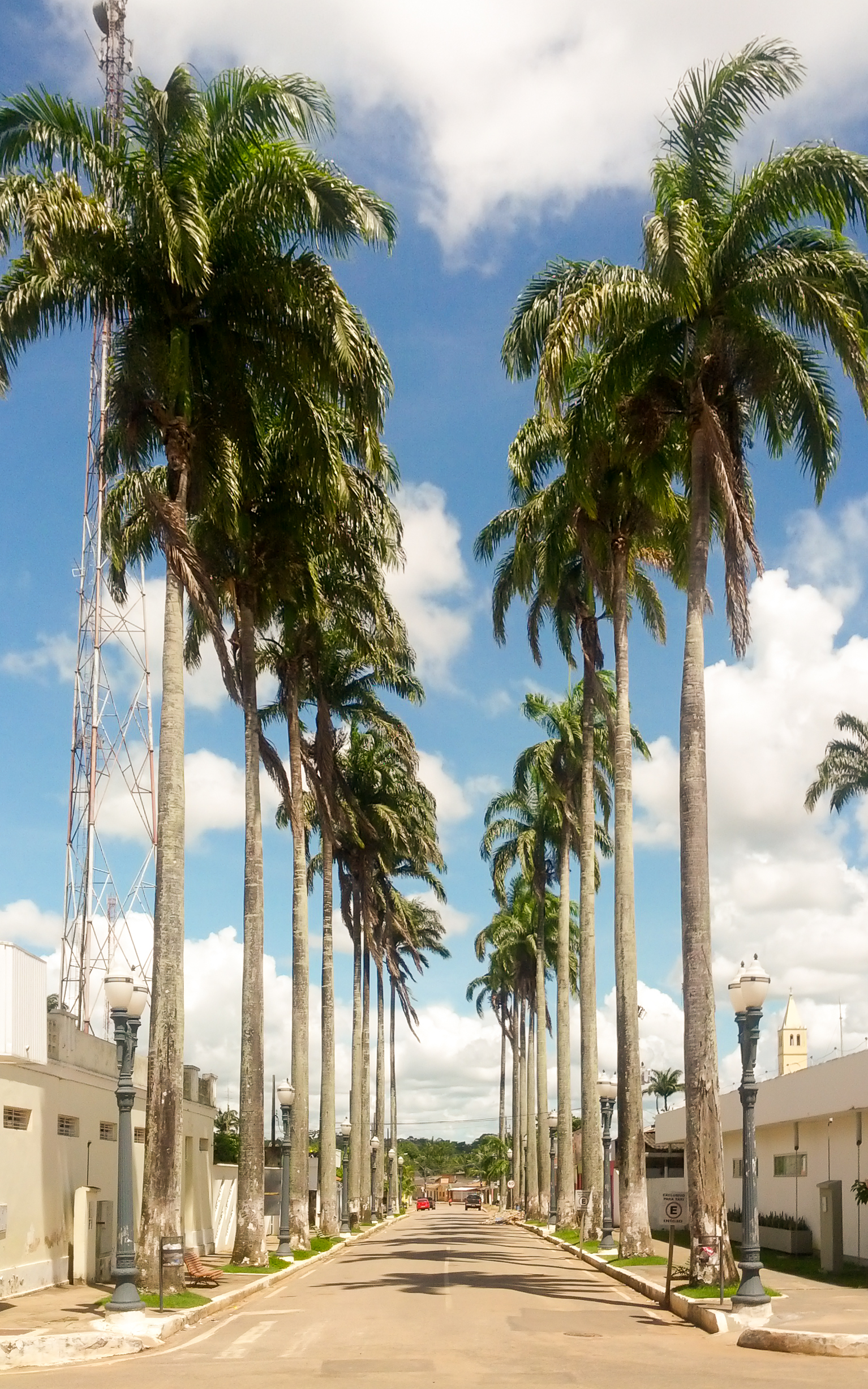
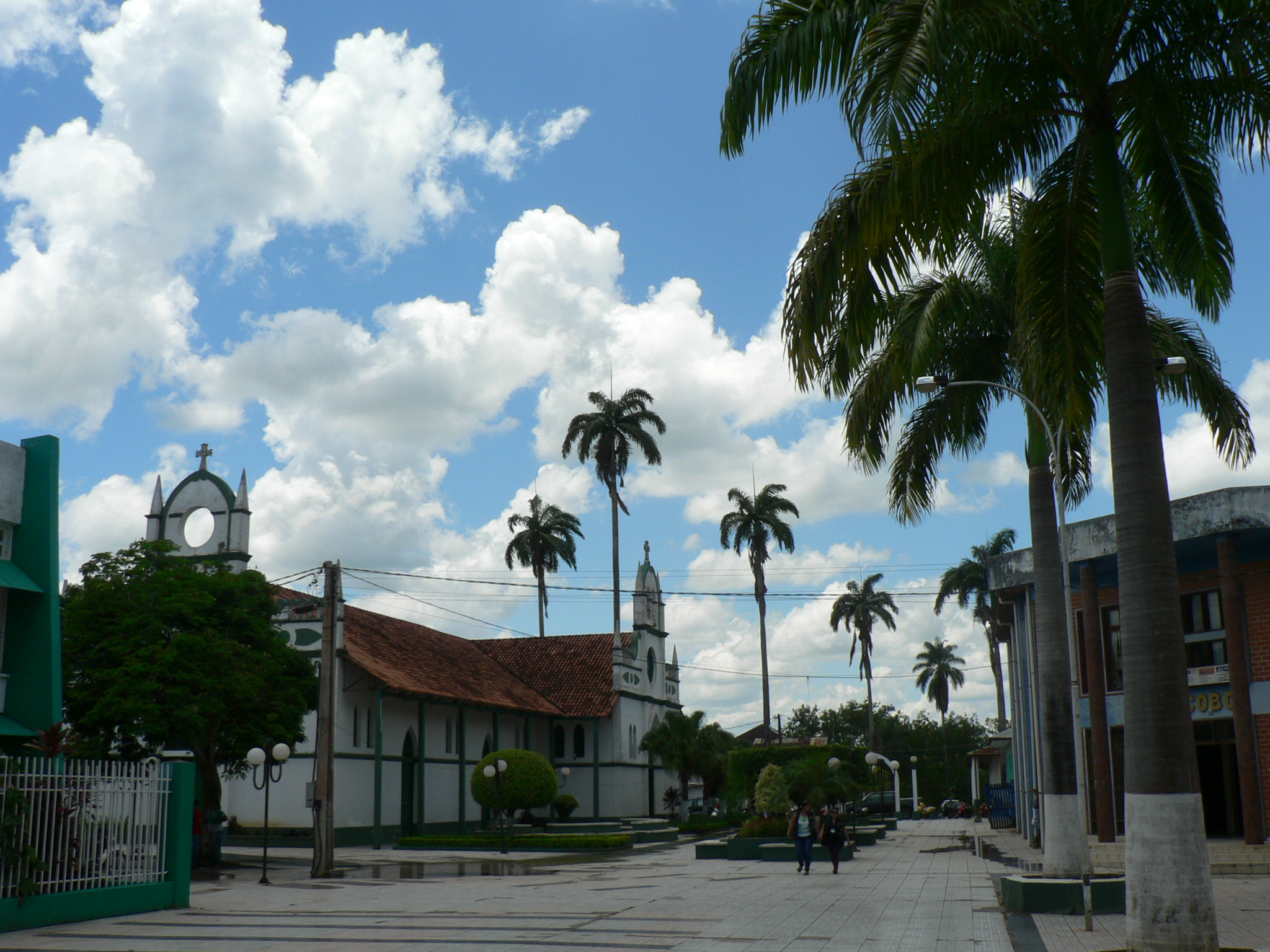
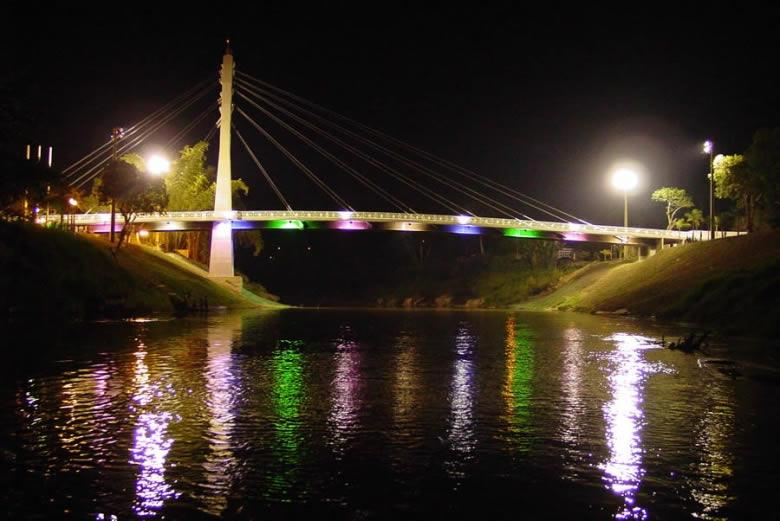
- Aerial view of Cobija Municipal Government Palace Monument to the Highway Effort and its Historic Cart Judicial Plaza Odilon Pratagi Street Square and church Wilson Pinheiro Binational Bridge (Friendship Bridge)

- Flag

- Location in Bolivia Cobija (South America)
- Coordinates: 11°01′50″S 68°46′00″W
- Country: Bolivia
- Department: Pando Department
- Province: Nicolás Suárez
- Founded: 1906

Government
  - Mayor: Ana Lucia Reis Melena

Area
  - Total: 401 km^{2} (155 sq mi)
- Elevation: 280 m (920 ft)

Population (2020)
  - Total: 55,114
  - Density: 137/km^{2} (356/sq mi)
- Time zone: UTC-4 (BOT)
- Area code: +591 842

Cobija is a city in Bolivia, capital of the department of Pando, and is located about 600 km (373 mi.) north of La Paz in the Amazon Basin on the border with Brazil. Cobija lies on the banks of the Rio Acre across from the Brazilian city of Brasiléia. Cobija lies at an elevation of ca. 280 m (920 ft.) above sea level and has a tropical and rainy climate.

Cobija has approximately 55,000 inhabitants, is the seat of a university and capital of the Bolivian Pando Department. Cobija has two airports and is connected by one road to El Choro in the Beni Department, which is not always passable during the rainy season. When the rain allows it, Cobija is connected to the rest of Bolivia also via road. Cobija is connected to Brazil by two bridges.

== History ==
Cobija was founded in 1906 by Colonel Enrique Cornejo, originally under the name of Bahía and received its current name in 1908 in commemoration of the former Bolivian seaport Cobija on the Pacific, which has been a part of Chile since the War of the Pacific. In the early 1900s, Cobija experienced a boom as an India rubber industry center. When the industry collapsed, a major source of income being lost, Cobija became impoverished and its population fell. Nowadays, Cobija is developing again and its population is increasing. Currently, the region's primary industry is Bolivia nuts, although tourism and commerce are growing. There is a Free economic zone in the city, the largest in Bolivia.

== Population ==
The inhabitants of Cobija has risen very strongly during the past three decades to more than four-fold. Currently the estimated population is as much as 80,000 inhabitants with a population growth of 6 to 8% per year.

Year	Population	Census
1992	11,375	census
2001	22,324	census
2012	46,267	census
2024	55,114	census

== Sports ==
The Estadio Roberto Jordán Cuellar is located in Cobija. The football stadium has a capacity of 24,000.

== Climate ==
The city of Cobija sits on a sharp curve of the Acre river, at an altitude of 280 metres (920 ft) above sea level and in the north-western Amazon region of Bolivia. Cobija is classified as a tropical monsoon climate, Am in the Köppen classification system. Cobija has two distinct seasons, with a noticeable dry season and a wet rainy season fed by powerful thunderstorms, with hot temperatures year-round.

Climate data for Cobjia (Captain Aníbal Arab Airport), elevation 235 m (771 ft)
Month	Jan	Feb	Mar	Apr	May	Jun	Jul	Aug	Sep	Oct	Nov	Dec	Year
Record high °C (°F)	37.2 (99.0)	35.5 (95.9)	35.0 (95.0)	36.2 (97.2)	36.0 (96.8)	37.2 (99.0)	38.0 (100.4)	39.5 (103.1)	40.7 (105.3)	40.6 (105.1)	36.6 (97.9)	36.5 (97.7)	40.7 (105.3)
Mean daily maximum °C (°F)	30.8 (87.4)	30.7 (87.3)	31.0 (87.8)	30.9 (87.6)	30.2 (86.4)	30.2 (86.4)	30.7 (87.3)	32.6 (90.7)	32.5 (90.5)	32.4 (90.3)	31.5 (88.7)	31.0 (87.8)	31.2 (88.2)
Daily mean °C (°F)	26.2 (79.2)	26.0 (78.8)	26.2 (79.2)	25.9 (78.6)	24.9 (76.8)	24.2 (75.6)	23.9 (75.0)	25.2 (77.4)	26.0 (78.8)	26.7 (80.1)	26.4 (79.5)	26.2 (79.2)	25.6 (78.2)
Mean daily minimum °C (°F)	21.5 (70.7)	21.4 (70.5)	21.4 (70.5)	20.9 (69.6)	19.5 (67.1)	18.0 (64.4)	16.9 (62.4)	17.9 (64.2)	19.5 (67.1)	20.8 (69.4)	21.2 (70.2)	21.5 (70.7)	20.0 (68.1)
Record low °C (°F)	14.8 (58.6)	15.0 (59.0)	12.8 (55.0)	11.2 (52.2)	8.0 (46.4)	9.4 (48.9)	7.0 (44.6)	7.1 (44.8)	8.0 (46.4)	10.0 (50.0)	10.5 (50.9)	14.5 (58.1)	7.0 (44.6)
Average precipitation mm (inches)	260.1 (10.24)	263.9 (10.39)	244.5 (9.63)	180.5 (7.11)	85.0 (3.35)	32.2 (1.27)	23.2 (0.91)	42.3 (1.67)	98.2 (3.87)	165.9 (6.53)	227.6 (8.96)	252.3 (9.93)	1,875.7 (73.86)
Average precipitation days	18.3	17.0	17.3	12.4	7.8	3.9	2.8	3.5	6.8	11.2	14.1	17.0	132.1
Average relative humidity (%)	84.1	84.7	84.4	83.4	81.7	80.0	75.1	71.8	73.9	77.9	80.9	82.8	80.1
Source: Servicio Nacional de Meteorología e Hidrología de Bolivia

== Consular representation ==
Brazil has a Consulate in Cobija.

== Gallery ==
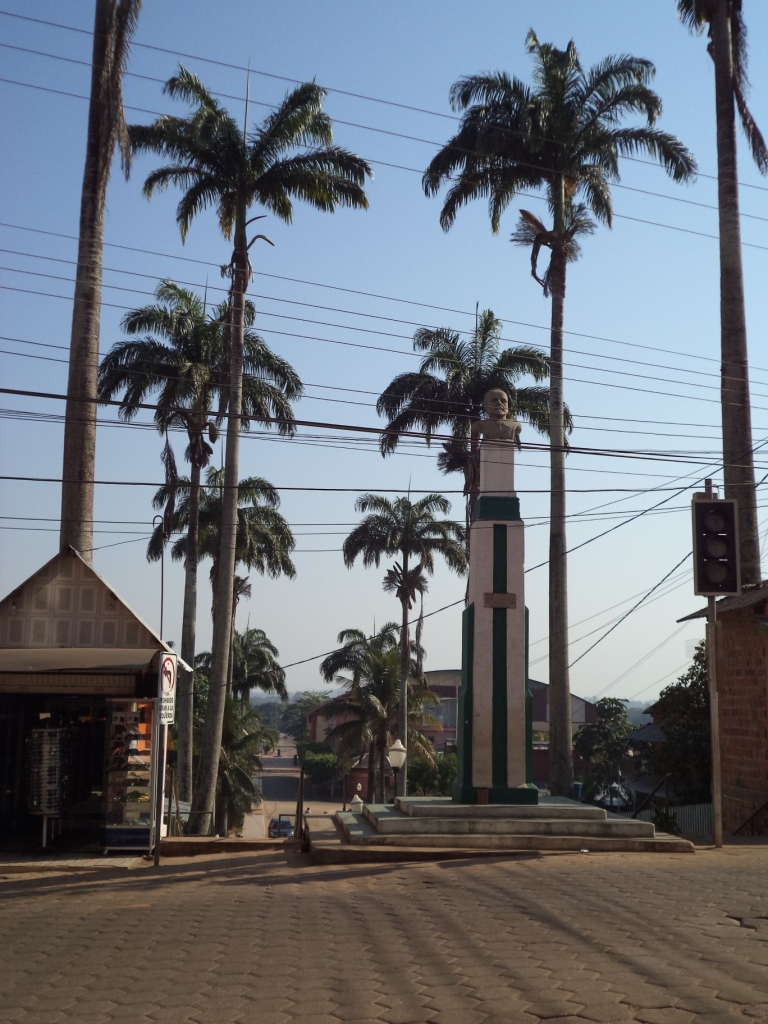
Cobija, Bolivia

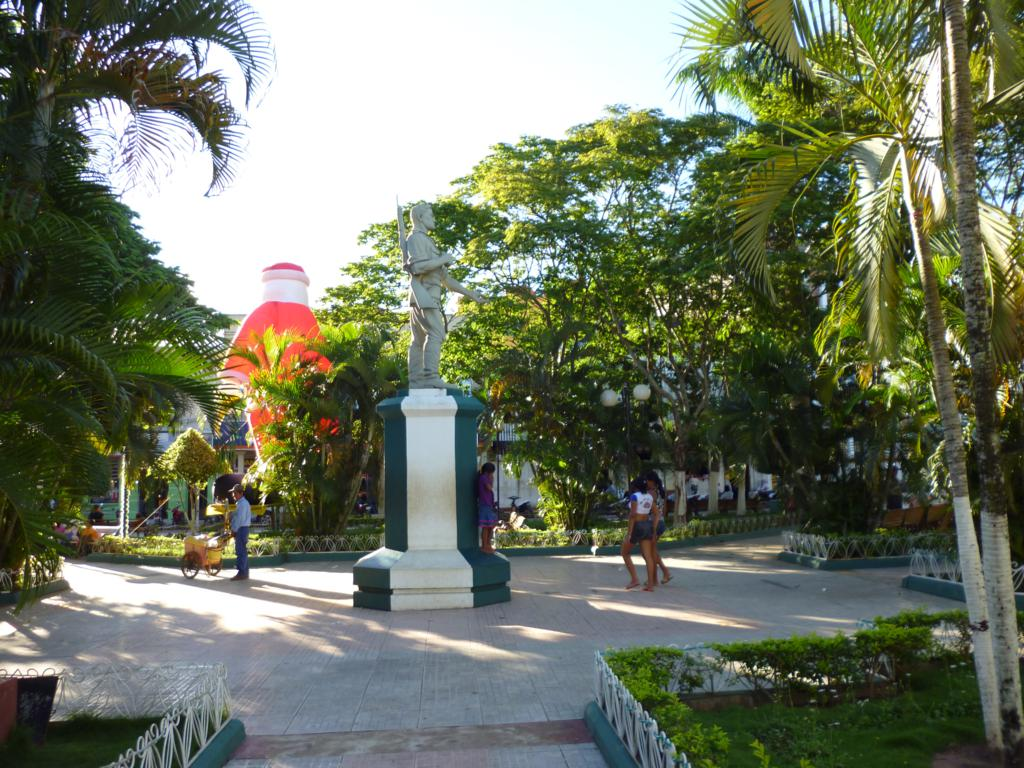
Central Park in Cobija

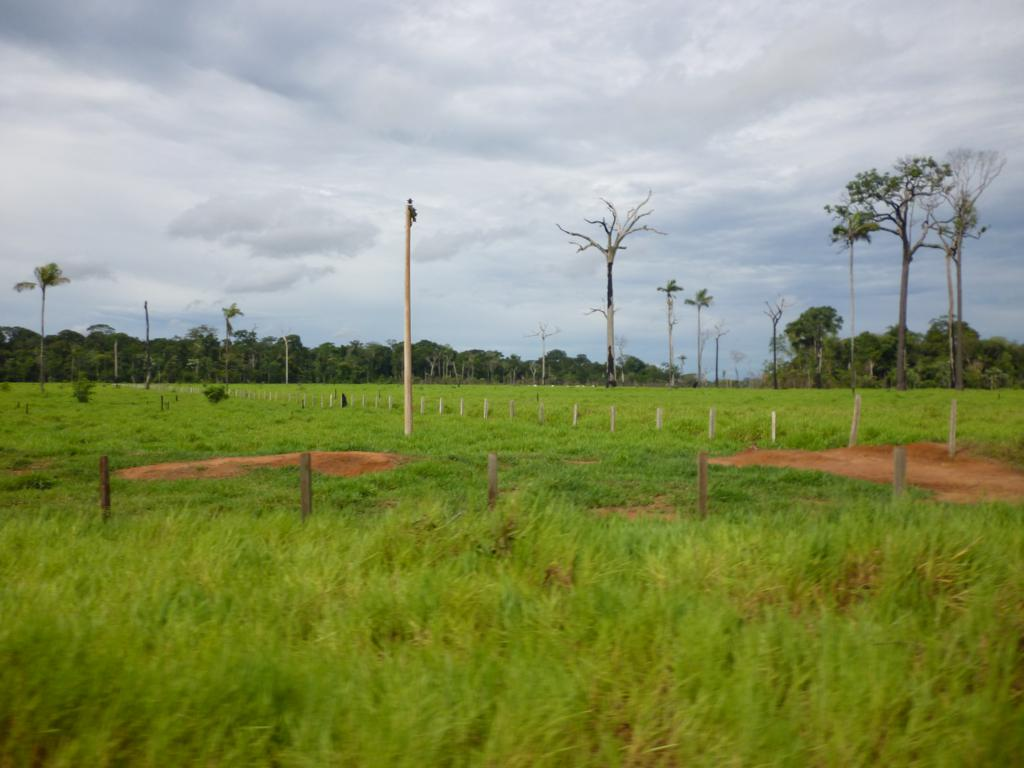
View along the road towards Riberalta

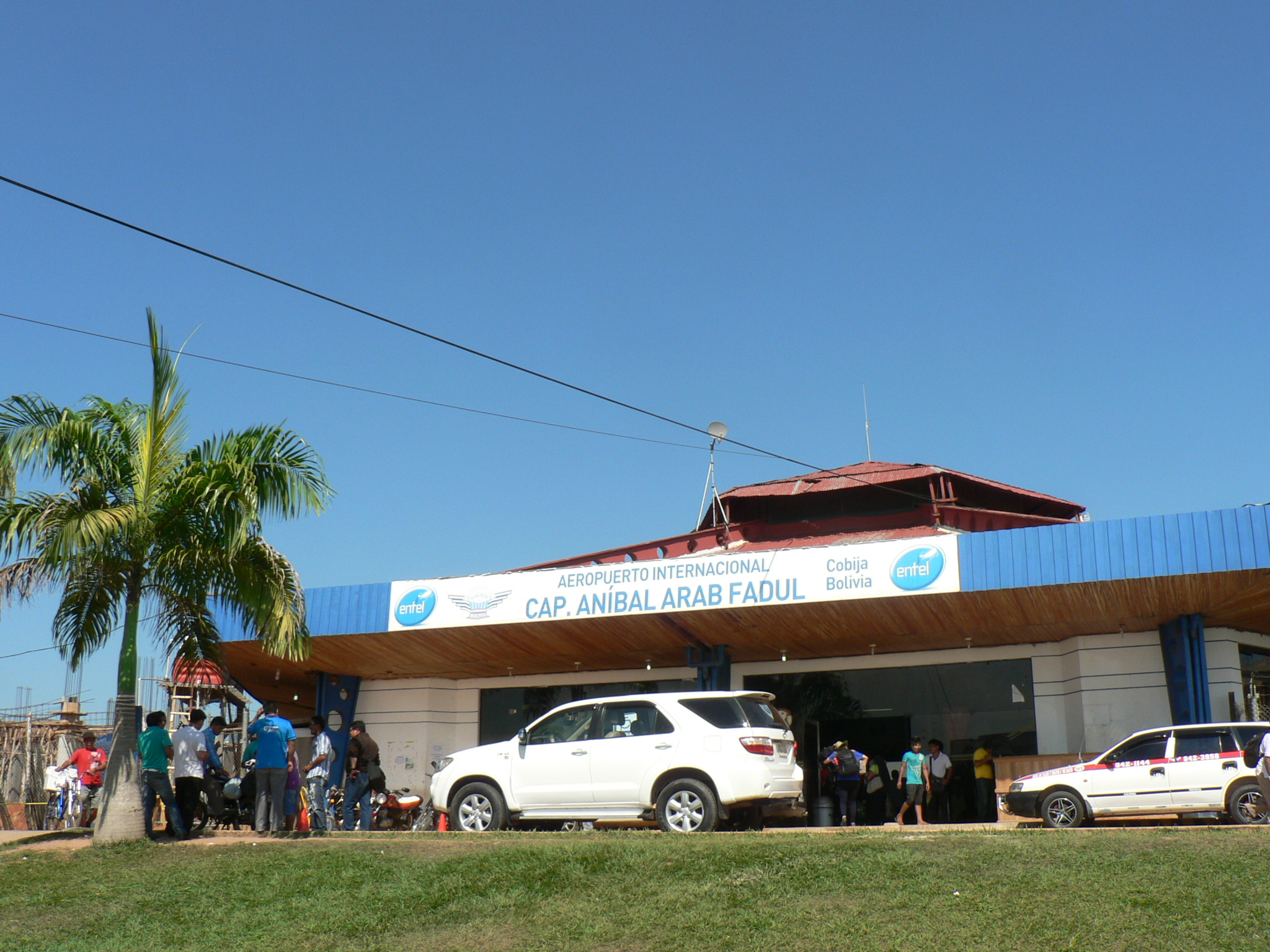
Old facade of Cobija airport, before the reformation.

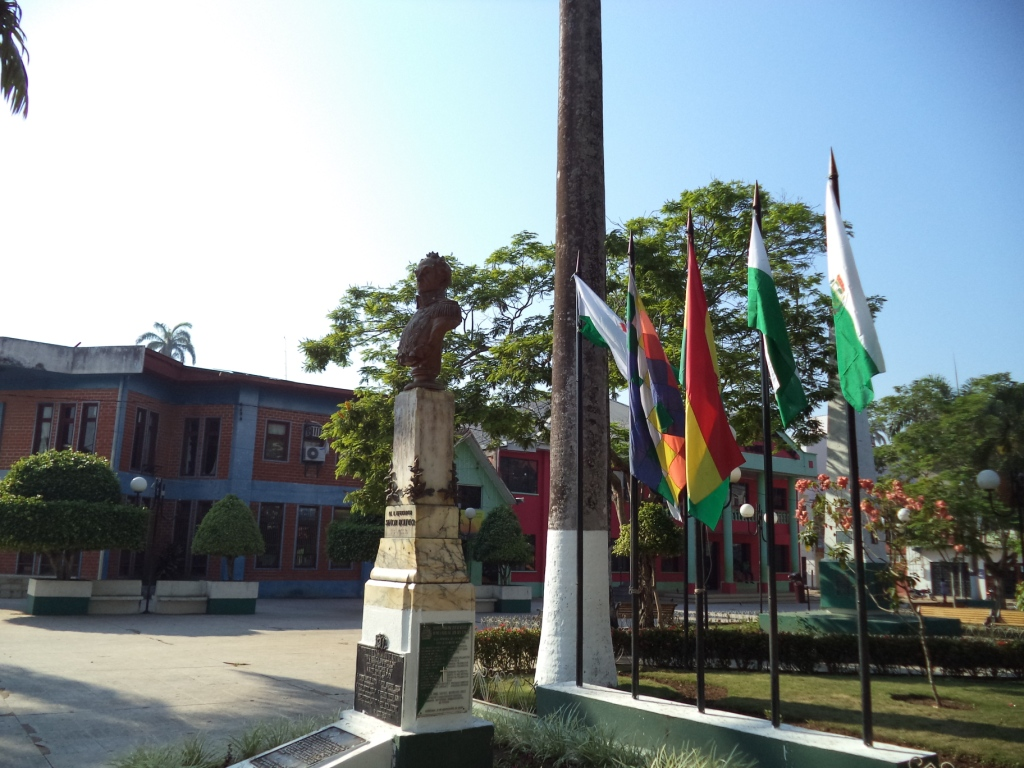
Simón Bolívar bust in Cobija

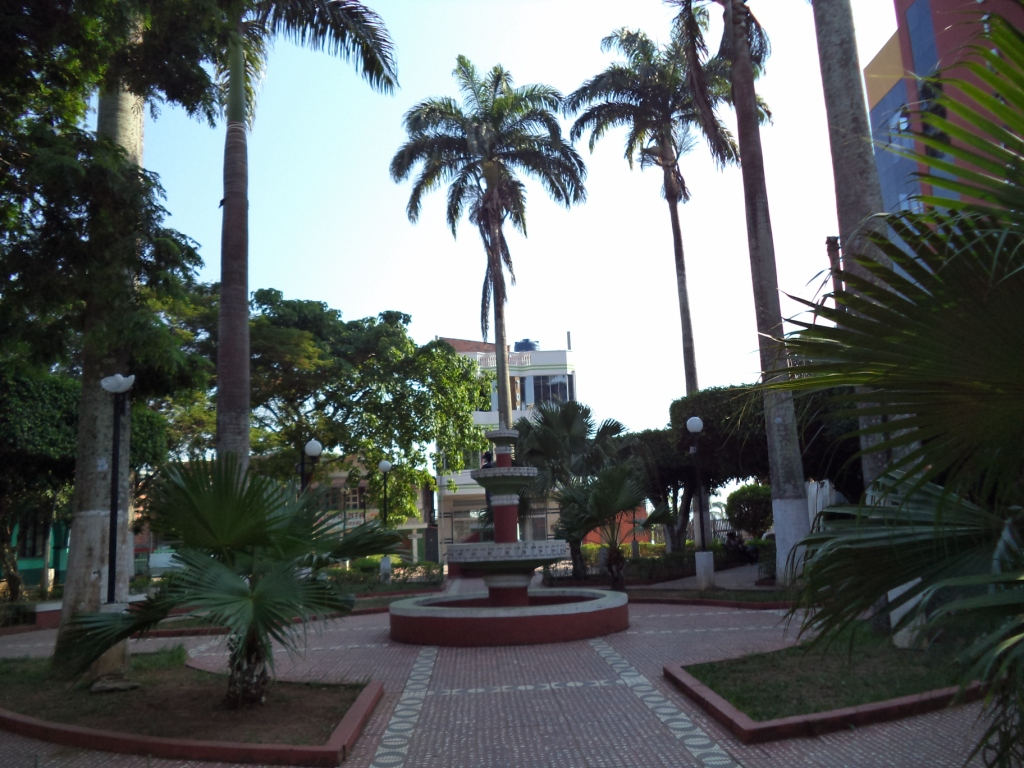
Cobija, Pando, Bolivia

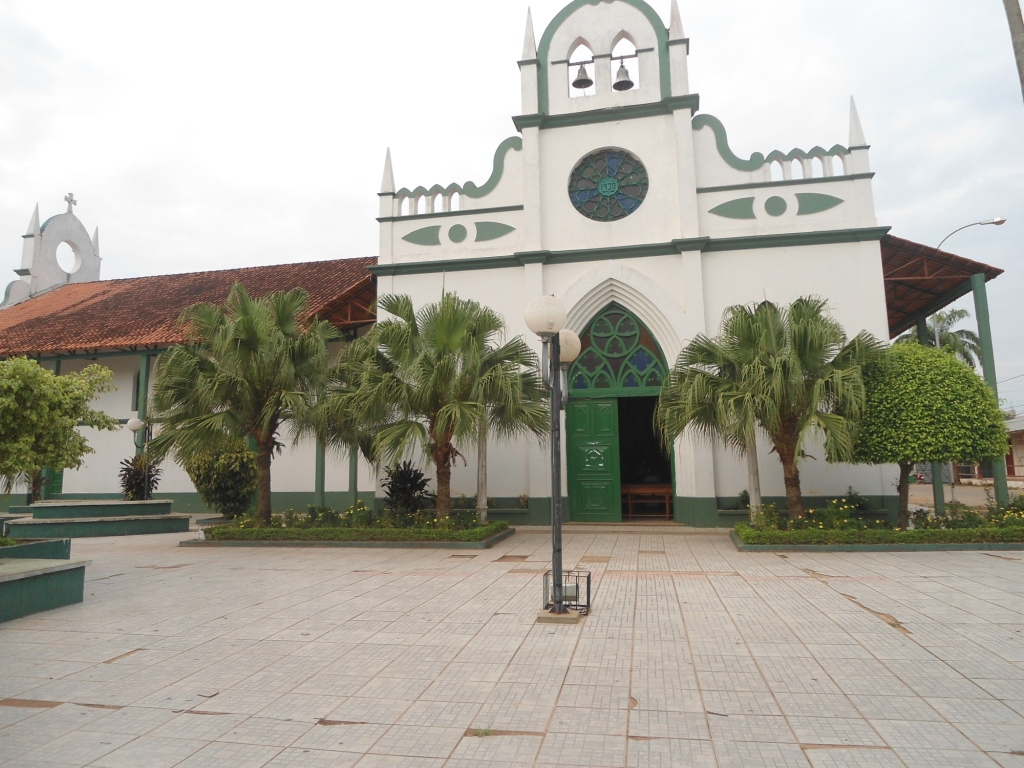
Nuestra Señora del Pilar Cathedral in Cobija and the city main square

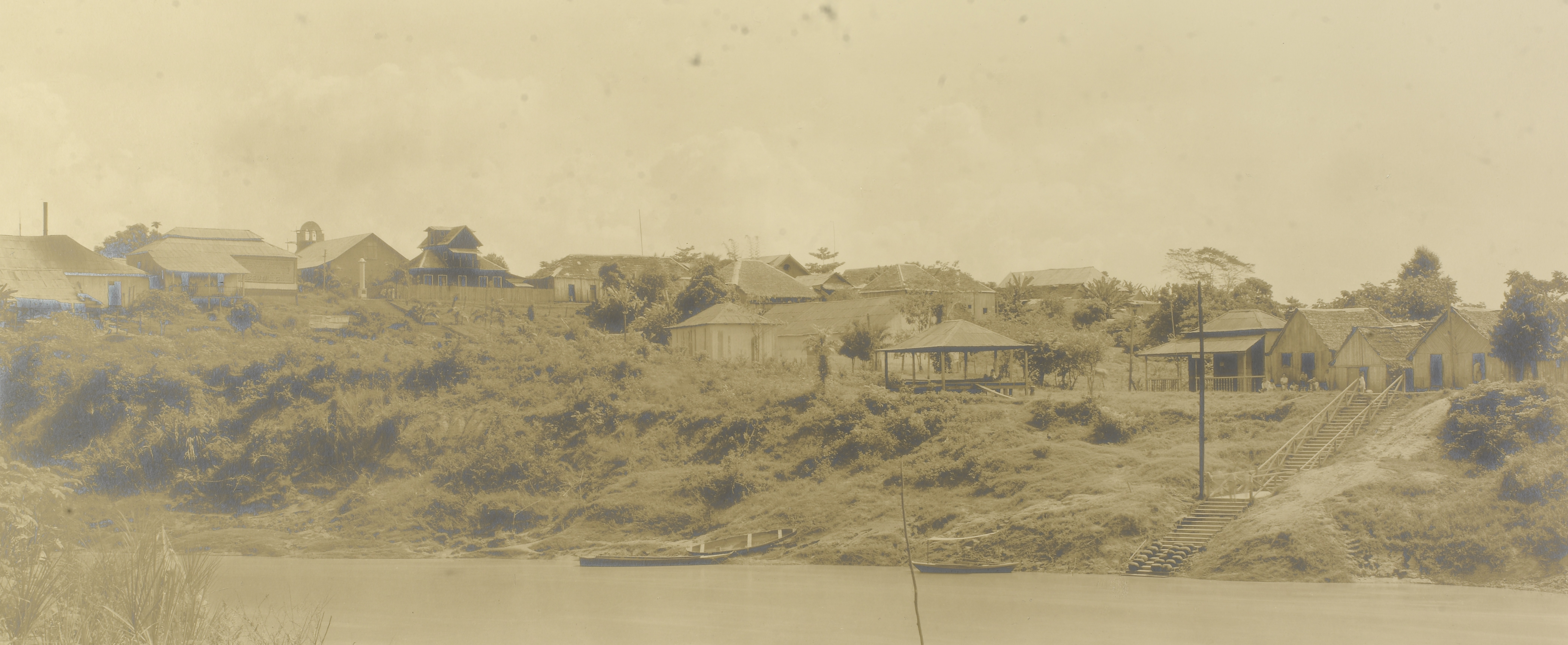
Cobija, 1930.

== Transportation ==
Cobija is served by major Bolivian airlines at Captain Aníbal Arab Airport and by buses to Riberalta. The Interoceanic Highway passes through the city of Cobija.
