= Jorge Wilstermann International Airport =

Airport in Cochabamba, Bolivia

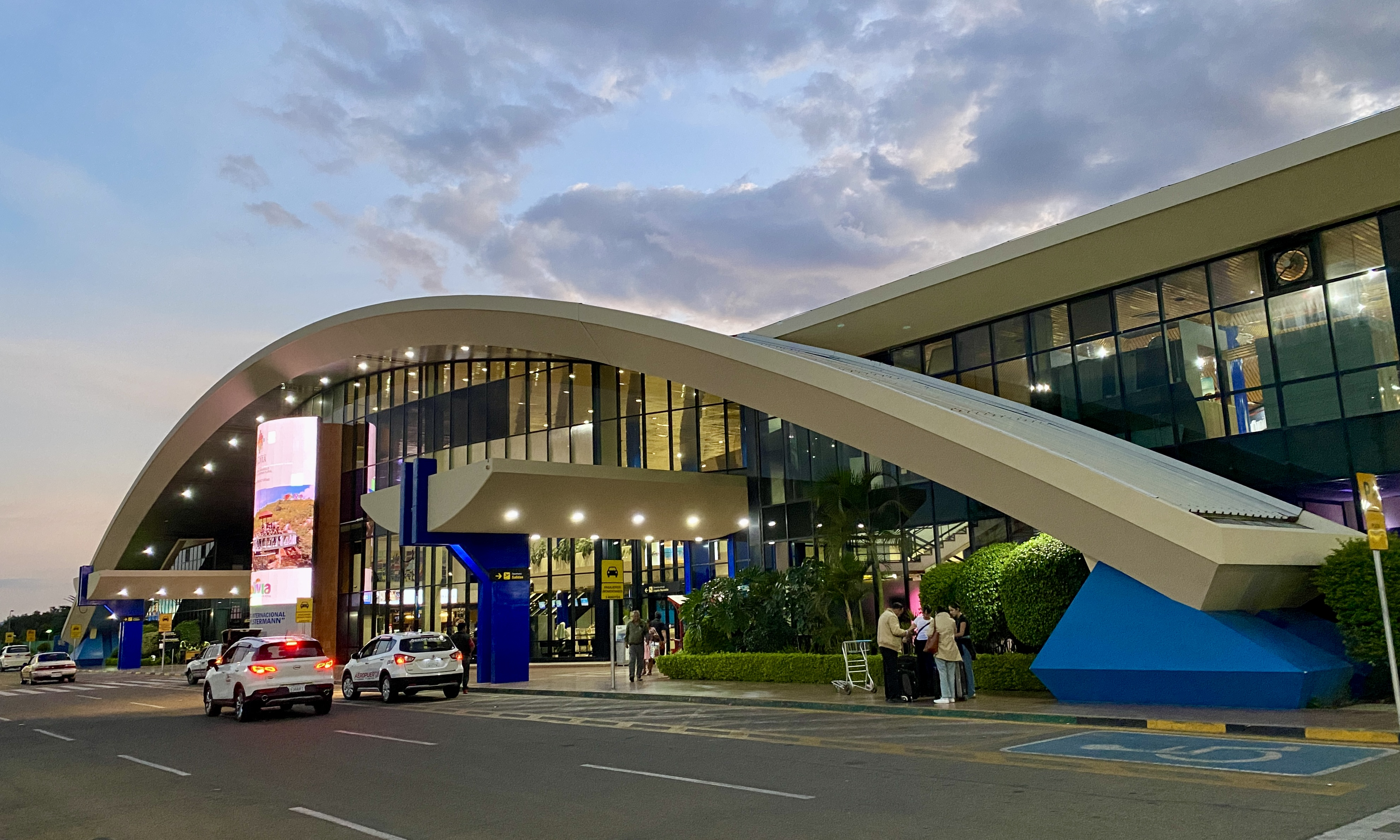
- IATA: CBB; ICAO: SLCB

Summary
- Airport type: Public / Military
- Owner: Ministry of Public Works, Services and Housing of Bolivia
- Operator: NAABOL
- Serves: Cochabamba, Bolivia
- Location: Cochabamba
- Elevation AMSL: 8,360 ft (2,550 m)
- Coordinates: 17°25′15″S 66°10′37″W
- Website: https://www.naabol.gob.bo

Map
- Location of airport in Bolivia

Runways
Direction	Length		Surface
Direction	m	ft	Surface
14/32	3,798	12,461	Asphalt
04/22	2,649	8,691	Asphalt

Statistics (2023)
- Passengers: 2,688,223
- Sources: AASANA WAD GCM

Jorge Wilstermann International Airport (Spanish: Aeropuerto Internacional Jorge Wilstermann, IATA: CBB, ICAO: SLCB) is a high elevation international airport serving Cochabamba, the capital of the Cochabamba Department of Bolivia. The facility is named after Jorge Wilstermann, an early Bolivian commercial aviator. The airport used to be the main base of operations for Bolivia's former flag carrier Lloyd Aéreo Boliviano and currently serves as the main domestic hub for Boliviana de Aviación due to its geographical location at the center of Bolivia.

== History ==
SABSA has been substituted in March 2022 by the newly established government agency Navegación Aérea y Aeropuertos Bolivianos (NAABOL). This state-owned agency now manages the airports in Bolivia.

== Airlines and destinations ==
Airlines	Destinations
Boliviana de Aviación	São Paulo–Guarulhos

== See also ==
- Transport in Bolivia
- List of airports in Bolivia
