= List of accidents and incidents involving the Fairchild Swearingen Metroliner =

This is a list of accidents and incidents involving the Fairchild Swearingen Metroliner series of aircraft.

== 1980s ==
=== 1980 ===
- On June 12, 1980, a Metro II operating as Air Wisconsin Flight 965 suffered an engine failure following massive water ingestion during a thunderstorm; the crew lost control and crashed near Valley, Nebraska. Both crew members and 11 passengers died; two passengers survived with serious injuries.

=== 1984 ===
- On January 30, 1984, a Metro II operated by Britt Airways crashed shortly after takeoff from Terre Haute, Indiana, during a repositioning flight to Evansville, Indiana. Three Britt employees, including its Director of Operations and Chief Pilot, were killed. The plane, N63Z, was destroyed. The cause was undetermined.

=== 1987 ===
- On January 15, 1987, a Metro II operating as Skywest Airlines Flight 1834 collided with a single engine Mooney M-20 near Kearns, Utah. All eight people on the Metro II and both pilots on the Mooney were killed.
- On February 5, 1987, a Metroliner III was landing when the visibility went below what the flight crew was trained for. On the late and low approach the aircraft belly landed and hit a snow bank. All 14 occupants survived.

=== 1988 ===
- On January 19, 1988, a Fairchild Metro III, operated by Trans-Colorado Airlines as Flight 2286, crashed near Bayfield, Colorado. Both crew members and seven of the 15 passengers died. Of the surviving passengers, only one was uninjured.
- On February 8, 1988, a Metro III operating as Nürnberger Flugdienst Flight 108 was struck by lightning, following which the electrical system failed. The right wing separated from the aircraft during an uncontrolled descent and the aircraft disintegrated and crashed near Kettwig, Germany. Both crew members and all 19 passengers died; it is currently the deadliest accident involving the Metroliner.
- On February 19, 1988, a Fairchild Metro operating as AVAir Flight 3378 crashed a mile from the runway after takeoff from Raleigh-Durham International Airport, North Carolina killing both crew members and all 10 passengers. Pilot error was found to be the cause.
- On November 18, 1988, Air Littoral Flight 440, a Swearing SA-226 Metroliner, operating a regular service from Montluçon – Guéret Airport to Orly Airport, climbed to 2,000 feet before impacting the ground due to an uncommanded stick-shaker push set off by the stall warning unexpectly activating, resulting in all four passengers and crew to perish.

=== 1989 ===
- On January 21, 1989, a Fairchild Metro II (OY-ARI) operating a charter flight attempted to make an emergency landing with one engine at Örnsköldsvik (OER) in IFR conditions but failed to feather the propeller making it hard to line up with the runway. It crashed in deep snow 30 m left of the runway injuring one passenger and destroying the aircraft.
- On September 26, 1989, Skylink Airlines Flight 070, a Fairchild Metro III, was on a scheduled flight from Vancouver (YVR) to Terrace (YXT), British Columbia with two pilots and five passengers on board. The aircraft crashed one quarter mile to the west of Terrace Airport while the crew was attempting to carry out a missed approach in IFR conditions. The aircraft was destroyed by the impact and a post-crash fire. All seven occupants were fatally injured in the crash.

== 1990s ==
=== 1991 ===
- On February 1, 1991, SkyWest Airlines Flight 5569, operated with a Metro III, was waiting on a runway at Los Angeles International Airport when a Boeing 737 operating USAir Flight 1493 collided with it, resulting in the death of the ten passengers and two crew members on board the Metro.

=== 1992 ===
- On August 25, 1992, a Lone Star Airlines Swearingen SA 227-AC Metro III on a test flight crashed after takeoff 1 km southeast of Memorial Field Airport due to improper maintenance of all primary flight control cables. All three occupants were killed.

=== 1995 ===
- On May 1, 1995, a Metro 23 operating as Bearskin Airlines Flight 362 (with a crew of two and one passenger on board) collided at 4,500 feet above sea level with an Air Sandy Piper PA-31 Navajo (with one pilot and four passengers on board) while on approach to Sioux Lookout Airport, destroying both aircraft and killing all persons on both aircraft.
- On September 16, 1995, a Tamair Metro III, VH-NEJ, crashed shortly after takeoff from Tamworth, NSW, Australia, killing two trainees, with the check and training captain surviving with serious injuries. There were no other passengers or crew. The crash occurred following a "V1 cut" at night and raised many questions regarding the safety of asymmetric training operations at night.

=== 1998 ===
- On June 18, 1998, Propair Flight 420, a Metro II flying from Dorval International Airport (now Montreal-Trudeau International Airport) to Peterborough Airport in Peterborough, Ontario, experienced a left wheel well fire when the overheated brake and wheel assembly was retracted into the enclosed wheel well. The heat dissipated to the tire and the surrounding structures, eventually causing a fire. During the attempted emergency landing at Mirabel Airport, the landing gear was extended on short final and when the aircraft was over the runway, the left wing broke upwards, the fuselage pivoted to the left and struck the ground. All 11 occupants were fatally injured.

== 2000s ==
=== 2001 ===
- On February 8, 2001, a Swearingen SA227 "Merlin" plane owned by Northern Illinois Flight Center that was landing from Chicago disappeared for 15 hours. Paul Welke, the owner of Island Airways, then flew as part of the rescue operation, finding 42 year old Mirth Gault and her children, ages 13, 9 and 5, alive next to the crashed aircraft debris. The crash killed both crew members.
- On October 10, 2001, a Merlin IVA operating as Flightline Flight 101 from Spain to Algeria crashed into the Mediterranean Sea off the Columbretes Islands in Valencia, Spain, killing all 10 people on board.

=== 2002 ===
- On 12 April 2002, Tadair Flight 306, operated by a Fairchild Swearingen Metroliner EC-GKR a cargo flight from Madrid–Barajas Airport to Palma de Mallorca. Flight 306 crashed on landing on runway 24L, killing both pilots.
- On December 24, 2002, a North Flying Swearingen Metroliner III contracted to Ben Air for mail services crashed right after takeoff at Aberdeen Airport in Scotland. The aircraft slid along a field, through a fence, and onto a road, where it struck a car. Both pilots and all occupants of the car survived. It was found that a bird strike occurred, but the accident was attributed to inappropriate crew actions.

=== 2005 ===
- On May 3, 2005, a Metro III operating a cargo flight as Airwork Flight 23 broke up in midair and crashed near Stratford, New Zealand. Both crew members died.
- On May 7, 2005, a Transair Metro 23 crashed near Lockhart River, north of Cooktown, Queensland in Australia. A total of 15 people died in what is, as of December 2009, the worst airline crash in Australia since the 1960s.

=== 2008 ===
- On June 19, 2008, a Fairchild SA-226 Merlin, a coastguard airframe, was being used to conduct pilot flight-skills tests for the Trondheim-based operator Helitrans, the pilots lost control during a stall exercise, and just 37 seconds after the control loss, and with an eventual sink rate of 10,000 ft/min, the turboprop hit the sea in a near-horizontal attitude, 18 nm west of Bergen, killing all three on board.

== 2010s ==
=== 2011 ===
- On February 10, 2011, Manx2 Flight 7100, a Metro III owned by the Spanish airline Air Lada operating on behalf of Manx2, was on a flight from Belfast, Northern Ireland to Cork, Ireland. The aircraft crashed on landing in fog, resulting in the death of six people.
- On September 6, 2011, Aerocon Flight 238 from El Trompillo Airport, Santa Cruz de la Sierra, Bolivia to Teniente Jorge Henrich Arauz Airport, Trinidad, Bolivia crashed on approach to Trinidad. The flight was operated by Swearingen SA-227 Metroliner CP-2548. Eight of the nine people on board were killed.

=== 2012 ===
- On 15 February 2012, a Toll Aviation Fairchild Metro III freighter came to rest on its fuselage at about 2:30 am. Neither of the two pilots were injured. The landing gear on the light plane failed to go down during testing after maintenance.
- On June 6, 2012, a SA227-C metro en route from Montevideo Carrasco, MVD to Buenos Aires Ezeiza (EZE) crashed into the Rio de la Plata close to the coast of Montevideo south of Flores Island. It was registered as CX-LAS operating a freight flight on behalf of DHL.

=== 2013 ===
- On November 3, 2013, Aerocon Flight 25, a SA227-BC Metro III, registration CP-2477, crashed when it was trying to land at Riberalta Airport (northern Bolivia) killing eight of the 18 people on board.
- On November 10, 2013, Bearskin Airlines Flight 311, a Swearingen SA227-AC Metro III, crashed on final approach to its destination of Red Lake, Ontario, Canada en route from Sioux Lookout, Ontario. The aircraft experienced a near total failure of the left engine at 500 ft AGL which, combined with the aircraft being in the landing configuration, caused a loss of airspeed resulting in an unrecoverable situation. Safety systems to assist in the handling with one engine out did not activate since the engine did not completely shut down; the scenario gave conflicting information to the pilots who did not have time to identify the nature of the failure. Two crew members and three passengers were killed in the crash. Two passengers sustained injuries but survived.
- On December 2, 2013, a Metroliner property of IBC Airways, flying from Las Américas International Airport, Dominican Republic, crashed in the municipality of Arecibo, Puerto Rico. Two people were killed in the accident.

=== 2015 ===
- On April 13, 2015, a Carson Air SA-226 Metro II, operating Carson Air Flight 66, disappeared somewhere in the North Shore Mountains after taking off from Vancouver International Airport for Prince George Airport. Debris was found near the area where the aircraft was last tracked.
- On June 2, 2015, an Aeronaves TSM Fairchild (Swearingen) SA226TC Metro II, registration XA-UKP (msn TC-376 built 1980) crashed shortly after take-off from Querétaro international airport, Querétaro State, Mexico.

=== 2016 ===
- On October 24, 2016, a CAE Aviation SA227-AT Merlin IVC crashed shortly after take-off from Malta International Airport. All five people on board were killed. The aircraft was taking part in a French-led surveillance operation to counter people-smuggling.
- On December 6, 2016, a Swearingen SA227-AC Metro III cargo plane, operating as Key Lime Air flight LYM308, crashed north of Pelham, Georgia, USA, on a flight from Panama City, Florida to Albany, Georgia. The pilot, the sole occupant, was killed. Weather in the area was poor, with a thunderstorm in the vicinity of the destination airport.

=== 2018 ===
- On March 29, 2018, a flight operated by the former airline Amaszonas, also using a Fairchild Swearingen Metroliner, suffered an accident after colliding with birds and crashing near a highway. However, all occupants survived, with only one person sustaining an ankle injury.

== 2020s ==
=== 2020 ===
- On February 24, 2020, a Fairchild SA227-DC Metro 23 aircraft, operated by Perimeter Aviation as Bearskin Airlines Flight 344, crashed about 4:10 p.m. CT at Dryden airport in Ontario. Transportation Safety Board of Canada investigations found pilot error was the result due to an incomplete pre-taxi checklist. The aircraft left the runway while taxiing and crashed into a snowbank at speed with left propeller fragments penetrating the aircraft interior and injuring passengers. Multiple passengers were injured but there were no fatalities.

=== 2021 ===
- On May 12, 2021, a Cirrus SR22, N416DJ and Key Lime Air Flight 970, a Swearingen SA-226-TC Metro II N280KL collided on approach to Centennial Airport in Colorado. The Cirrus made a safe off-airport parachute-assisted landing, while the Key Lime pilot landed safely at Centennial despite the loss of a section of the cabin roof and damage to the empennage. There were no injuries.
- On December 10, 2021, a SA 227-DC Metroliner, operating as Castle Aviation Flight 921, crashed in Bedford, New Hampshire, on approach to nearby Manchester-Boston Regional Airport. The pilot was the only person on board the plane, which was delivering medical supplies. The sole occupant was killed.

=== 2022 ===
- On November 15, 2022, an SA227-AT Expediter crashed on the Western Lakes Golf Club in Pewaukee, Wisconsin, 6 km short of Runway 10 at Waukesha County Airport. The plane was flying from New Orleans to Waukesha to deliver dogs to the Humane Animal Welfare Society of Waukesha. All three persons and all 53 dogs on the aircraft survived.
