= Aerocon =

Airline of Bolivia

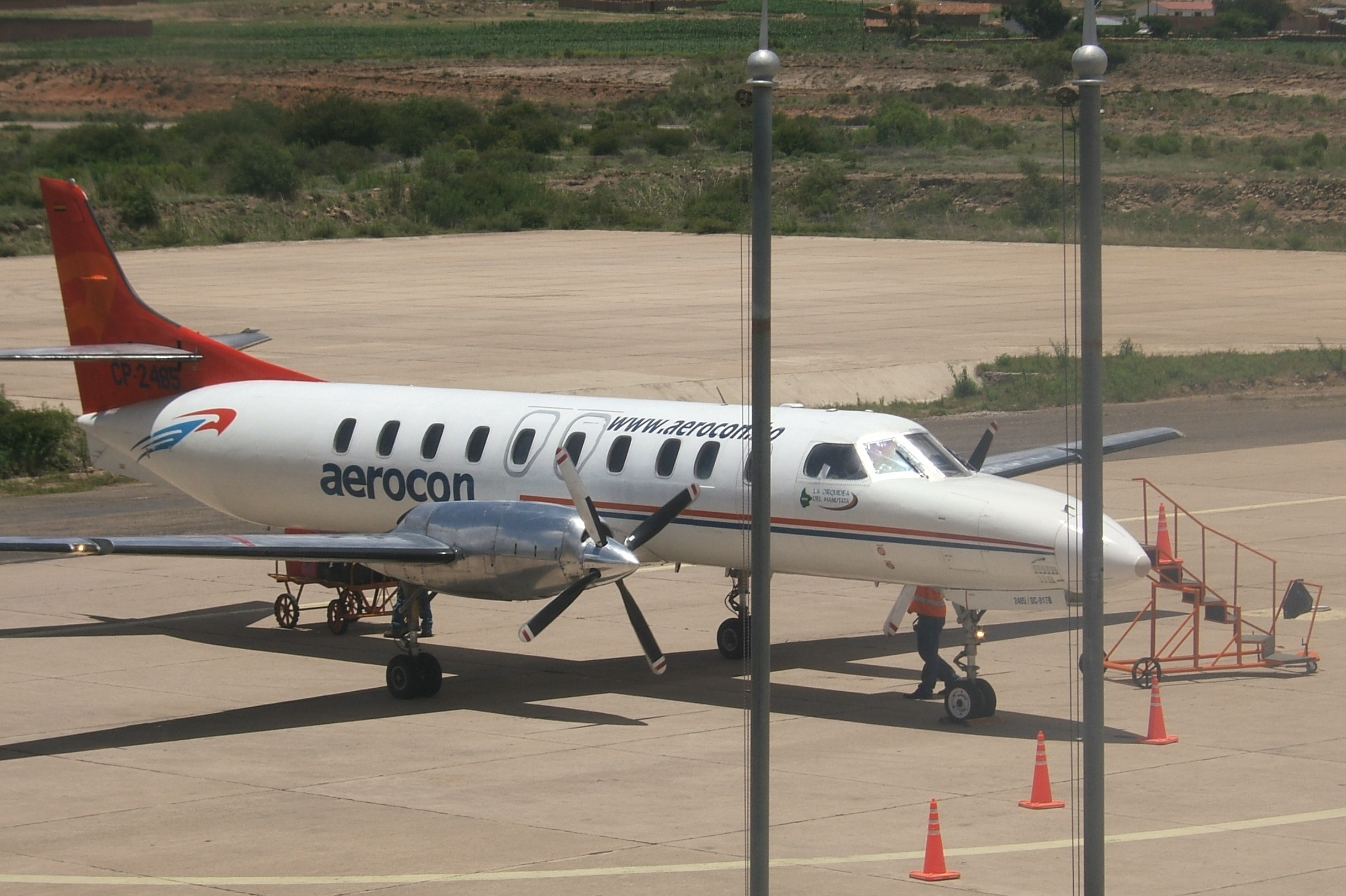
IATA	ICAO	Call sign
A4	AEK	AEROCON
- Founded: 2005
- Ceased operations: 2015
- Fleet size: 9
- Destinations: 0
- Headquarters: El Trompillo Airport; Santa Cruz de la Sierra, Bolivia
- Website: http://www.aerocon.bo/

Aero Comercial Oriente Norte Ltda., doing business as Aerocon, was a Bolivian airline. Its national office was in Hangar 93 in El Trompillo Airport in Santa Cruz de la Sierra.

It started its operations in 2005. In 2006, the airline transferred its operational base to Trinidad. It was also called the Airline of Beni Department. It operated from Trinidad to Cobija, Cochabamba, Guayaramerín, La Paz, Riberalta, Santa Cruz, Yacuiba, Sucre, and Tarija but in 2015 it stopped operating due to finance problems and resulting severe security issues.

== Destinations ==
In January 2013, Aerocon offered scheduled flights to the following destinations:

Bolivia

- Cobija - Captain Aníbal Arab Airport
- Cochabamba - Jorge Wilstermann International Airport
- Guayaramerín - Guayaramerín Airport
- La Paz - El Alto International Airport
- Oruro - Juan Mendoza Airport
- Potosí - Captain Nicolas Rojas Airport
- Puerto Suarez - Puerto Suárez International Airport
- Riberalta - Riberalta Airport
- Rurrenabaque - Rurrenabaque Airport
- Santa Cruz - El Trompillo Airport
- Sucre - Juana Azurduy de Padilla International Airport
- Tarija - Capitán Oriel Lea Plaza Airport
- Trinidad - Teniente Jorge Henrich Arauz Airport
- Yacuiba - Yacuiba Airport

== Fleet ==
Aerocon fleet
Aircraft	Total	Orders	Passengers	Notes
Fairchild Metro 23	4	0	19	
Fairchild Metro III	5	0	19	
Total	9	0		

== Accidents and incidents ==
- On 7 September 2011, Aerocon Flight 238 from El Trompillo Airport, Santa Cruz de la Sierra to Teniente Jorge Henrich Arauz Airport, Trinidad, Bolivia crashed on approach to Trinidad. The flight was operated by a Fairchild SA227-BC Metro III. There were nine people on board, of whom eight were killed.
- On 3 November 2013, Aerocon Flight 25 crashed when it was trying to land at Riberalta Airport, Bolivia. The flight was operated by a Swearingen SA227-BC Metro III. There were 18 people on board, of whom eight were killed.
