= Aerocon Flight 25 =

2013 aviation accident

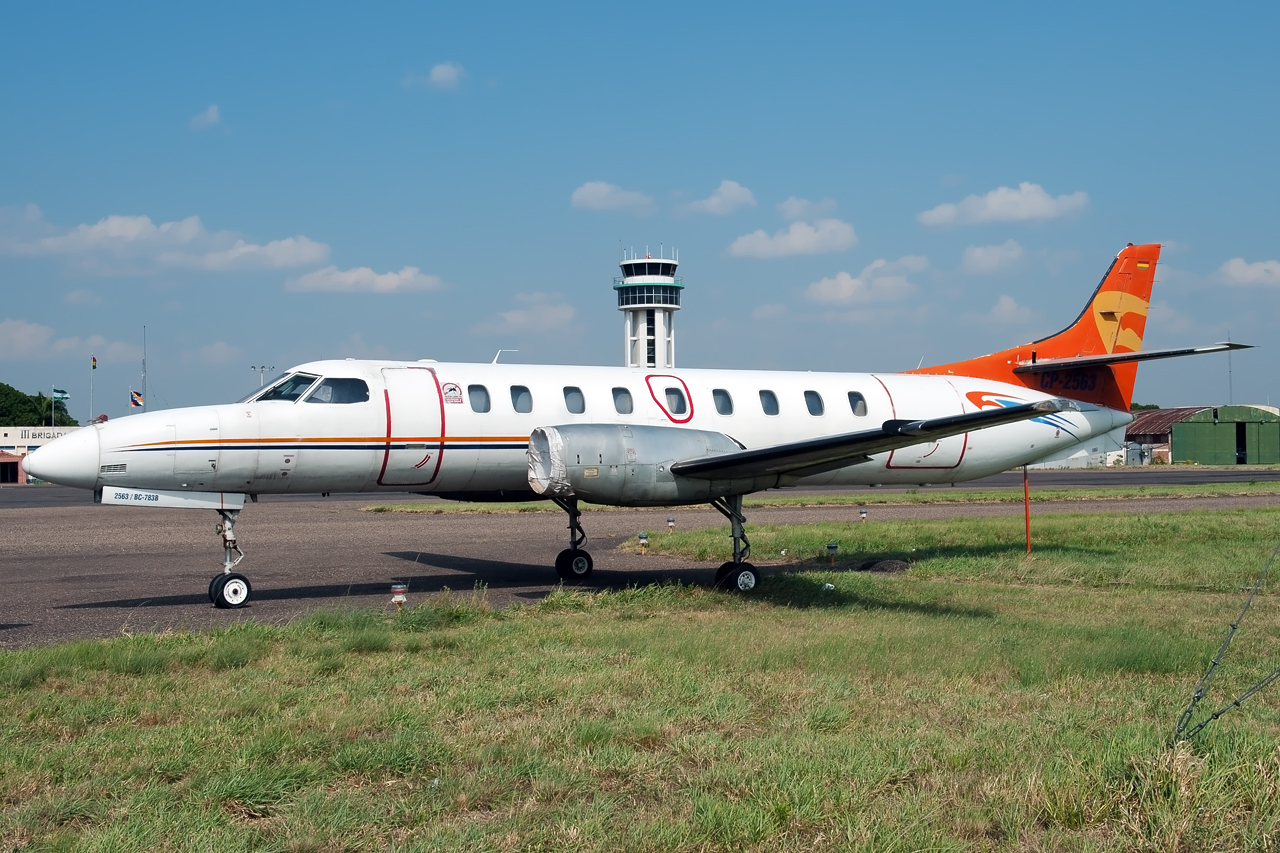
- An Aerocon Swearingen Metro III similar to the plane involved in the accident

Accident
- Date: 3 November 2013
- Summary: Crashed on the runway on landing due to windshear
- Site: Riberalta, Bolivia

Aircraft
- Aircraft type: Swearingen SA-227AC Metro III
- Operator: Aerocon
- IATA flight No.: A425
- ICAO flight No.: AEK25
- Call sign: AEROCON 25
- Registration: CP-2754
- Flight origin: Teniente Jorge Henrich Arauz Airport, Trinidad, Beni, Bolivia
- Destination: Riberalta Airport, Riberalta, Bolivia
- Occupants: 18
- Passengers: 16
- Crew: 2
- Fatalities: 8
- Injuries: 10
- Survivors: 10

On 3 November 2013, Aerocon Flight 25, a domestic passenger flight operated by a SA-227AC Metro III, crashed upon landing at Riberalta Airport, Bolivia, due to windshear. Of the 18 people on board, 10 people survived; the remaining eight passengers died in the accident, including a six-year-old girl.

== Passengers and crew ==
=== Passengers ===
There were 16 passengers on board the plane, all of Bolivian nationality: eight of them died and the other 10 survived.

=== Crew ===
The flight was piloted by Captain Kevin Roca Alpire, and co-pilot Cecilia Tapia Salinas. Both pilots survived the crash.

== Aircraft ==
The aircraft involved was a Swearingen SA-227AC Metro III built in 1988, with serial number 721 and powered by two Garrett TPE331 engines. It was in service with Aerocon and was registered as CP-2754.

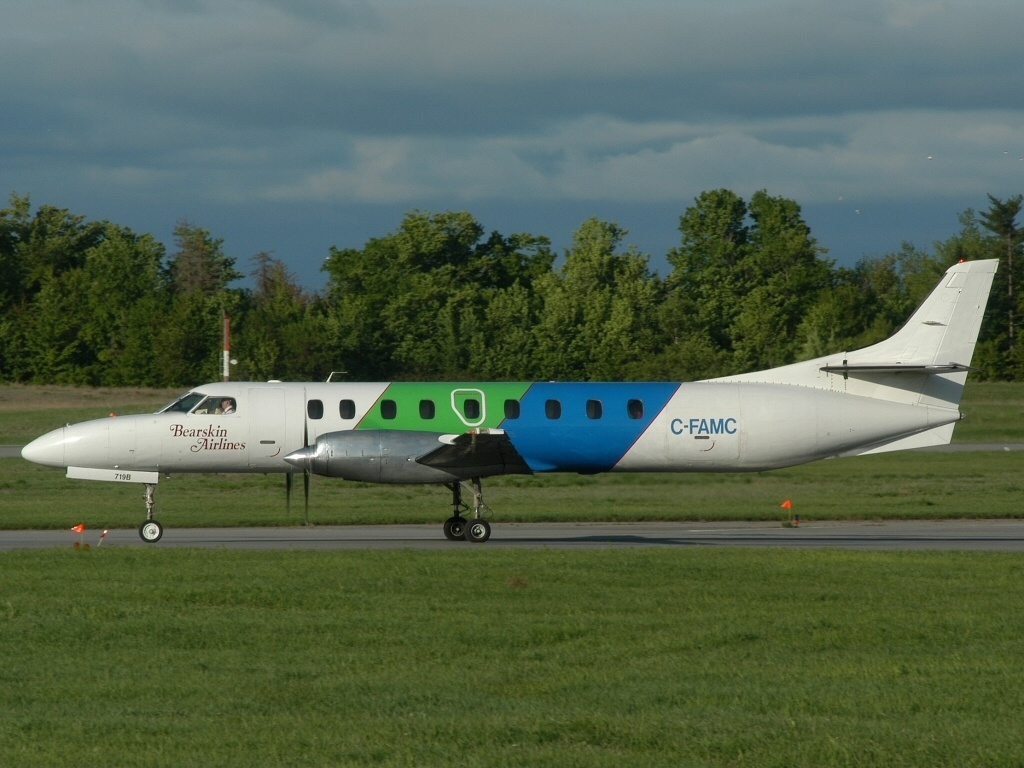
The aircraft involved, while in service with Bearskin Airlines (C-FAMC)

Its previous operators included Textron Financial (N27239), Mesaba Airlines (N438MA), Bearskin Airlines (C-FAMC), Lynx Air International, and Locair, before being acquired by Aerocon in 2013 under the registration CP-2754

== Accident ==
The flight took off from Teniente Jorge Henrich Arauz Airport in Trinidad at 14:58 local time on a domestic flight to Riberalta Airport, Riberalta. The Riberalta tower controller cleared the flight for an approach to runway 32, followed by a circling approach to runway 14. The controller reported winds at 7 knots. Visibility was 3,000 meters due to rain.

The flight reported passing the BIXIN waypoint at 15:55. At 15:57, the crew reported passing the EDNAX waypoint, located 5 nautical miles (9.3 km) from the threshold of runway 32. The controller then warned the crew that the runway was wet and that visibility was reduced due to rain and fog. Upon landing, the aircraft veered to the right and went off the runway, overturning in a nearby field and catching fire shortly after impact. Around 500 people rushed to help the victims. Armed with sticks, metal bars, and other objects, they forced open the aircraft to rescue the injured. They managed to pull out only ten survivors; the other eight perished in the fire, including a six-year-old girl identified as Rossío Álvarez.

== Reactions ==
Bolivian president Evo Morales sent his condolences to the families of the victims and asked for an investigation to be started, he also requested sanctions for the airline, Aerocon, due to its alleged poor safety standards; according to the bolivian government this was the fourth accident for Aerocon since 2012. The day after the accident, 4 November, the General Directorate of Civil Aviation (Dirección General de Aeronáutica Civil, or DGAC) formed a commission to investigate the accident.

== Consequences ==
The accident not only revealed deficiencies in operational safety oversight by the Directorate General of Civil Aeronautics (DGAC), but it also exposed the fact that Riberalta Airport lacked a fire truck or any equipment to handle emergencies of any kind, according to experts. The mayor of Riberalta, Mauro Cambero, revealed that there was no firefighting vehicle available to respond to such tragedies, stating that more lives could have been saved if the fire had been controlled in time:

This has exposed the limitations of our airport, in a city of more than 100,000 inhabitants, and that AASANA does not have the necessary equipment or a fire truck, said Cambero.

Meanwhile, the former governor of Beni, Ernesto Suárez, blamed the government for failing to invest in the Administration of Airports and Auxiliary Air Navigation Services (AASANA) in terms of equipment and other resources that could help prevent accidents:

Unfortunately, AASANA is under the control of the national government, and investments are not being prioritized properly. I think it’s great to invest in football fields, that’s fine, but saving lives should also be a priority. I’m talking about securing necessary equipment to save lives at airports and ensuring proper conditions, said Suárez.

== Investigation ==
The investigation was conducted by the Directorate General of Civil Aeronautics (DGAC), which had access to the flight recorder audio that captured the cockpit conversation between the pilot and the co-pilot. The audio lasted 33 minutes, during which 17 instances were recorded where the crew discussed the bad weather conditions in Riberalta, as well as their contact with the control tower in Guayaramerín, which was considered as an alternative landing site.

In the audio, the co-pilot can be heard mentioning the presence of a cumulonimbus (a black water-laden cloud) at the runway threshold, which obstructed visibility. What ultimately caused the aircraft to crash was actually a windshear from behind, which pushed it downward, causing the aircraft to lose lift, overturn, and crash onto the runway.

After nearly two years, it was concluded that the accident was not only due to human error and bad weather but also the shared responsibility of other entities tasked with overseeing aviation operations.
