= Flight 66 =

Flight 66 may refer to the following aviation accidents:

- Eastern Air Lines Flight 66, crashed on 24 June 1975
- Flying Tiger Line Flight 066, crashed on 19 February 1989
- Carson Air Flight 66, crashed on 13 April 2015
- Air France Flight 66, engine failure on 30 September 2017
