= EcoJet (Bolivian airline) =

Bolivian airline

IATA	ICAO	Call sign
8J	ECO	ECOJET
- Founded: 21 May 2013; 13 years ago
- Hubs: Jorge Wilstermann International Airport
- Fleet size: 4
- Destinations: 9
- Headquarters: Cochabamba, Bolivia
- Key people: Ervin Gonzales (Chairman); Linder Delgadillo (CEO)
- Website: https://flyecojet.aero/

Línea Aérea EcoJet S.A. (stylized as ecojet) is a Bolivian domestic airline headquartered in Santa Cruz de la Sierra, Bolivia. It started scheduled passenger operations on November 24, 2013, with two 93-seat Avro RJ85 aircraft. The airline linked its home city of Cochabamba, strategically located in the center of the country, with 9 major domestic destinations, reaching all the main centers of population. Ecojet is a private airline that competed with state-owned airline Boliviana de Aviación in the Bolivian domestic market. Its main hub is Jorge Wilstermann International Airport in the city of Cochabamba.

== History ==
Ecojet was established on May 21, 2013, and started operations with an inaugural flight linking Cochabamba with Sucre using an Avro RJ85.

== Destinations ==
The airline flies to nine destinations.

City	IATA	ICAO	Airport	Refs
Cobija	CIJ	SLCO	Cobija Airport	
Cochabamba	CBB	SLCB	Jorge Wilstermann International Airport	
Guayaramerin	GYA	SLGY	Guayaramerín Airport	
La Paz	LPB	SLLP	El Alto International Airport	
Riberalta	RIB	SLRI	Riberalta Airport	
Santa Cruz	VVI	SLVR	Viru Viru International Airport	
Sucre	SRE	SLAL	Alcantarí Airport	
Tarija	TJA	SLTJ	Capitán Oriel Lea Plaza Airport	
Trinidad	TDD	SLTR	Teniente Jorge Henrich Arauz Airport	

== Fleet ==
=== Current fleet ===
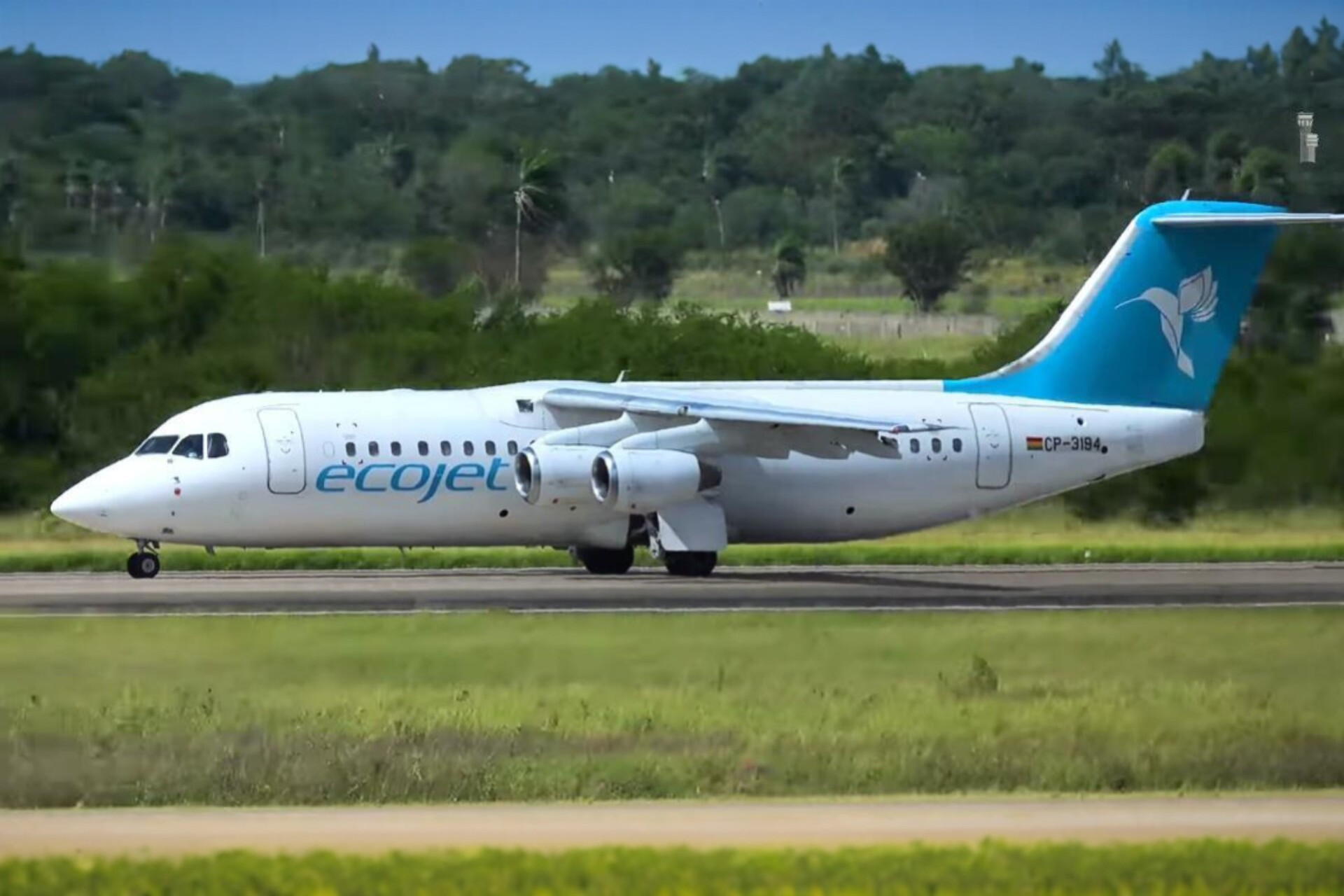
An Ecojet Avro RJ85 (CP-2788) taxiing at Viru Viru International Airport

As of August 2025, EcoJet operates the following aircraft:

EcoJet fleet
Aircraft	In service	Orders	Passengers	Notes
Avro RJ85	3	—	93	
Avro RJ100	1	—	112	
Total	4	—		

=== Former fleet ===
EcoJet formerly operated the following aircraft:

EcoJet former fleet
Aircraft	Total	Introduced	Retired	Notes
Boeing 737-300	1	2019	2021	Sold to RUTACA Airlines

== See also ==
- List of airlines of Bolivia
