= Aerocon Flight 238 =

2011 aviation accident

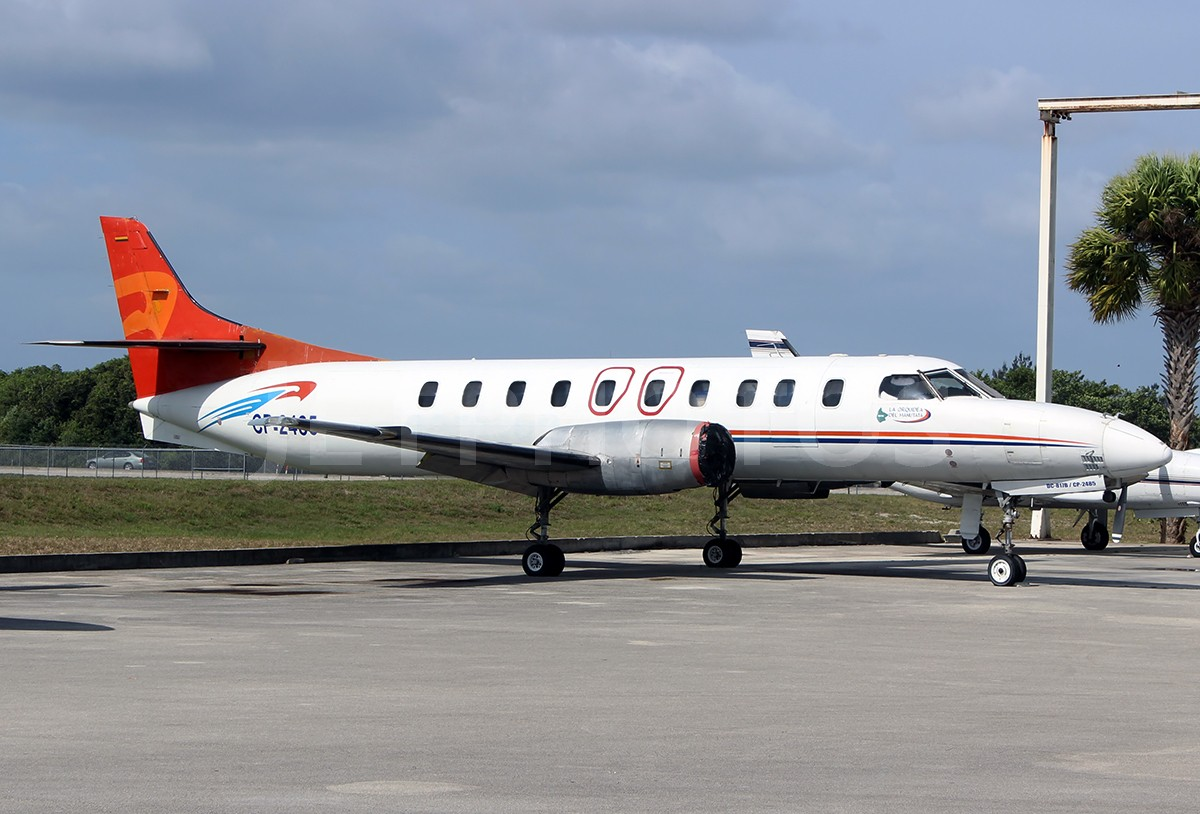
- A Fairchild Metro similar to the accident aircraft

Accident
- Date: 6 September 2011
- Summary: Controlled flight into terrain
- Site: Near Teniente Jorge Henrich Arauz Airport, Trinidad, Bolivia

Aircraft
- Aircraft type: Fairchild SA227-BC Metro III
- Operator: Aerocon
- Registration: CP-2548
- Flight origin: El Trompillo Airport, Santa Cruz de la Sierra, Bolivia
- Destination: Teniente Jorge Henrich Arauz Airport, Trinidad, Bolivia
- Occupants: 9
- Passengers: 7
- Crew: 2
- Fatalities: 8
- Injuries: 1
- Survivors: 1

On 6 September 2011, Aerocon Flight 238, a Fairchild Metro III regional passenger aircraft on a service from Santa Cruz de la Sierra to Trinidad, Bolivia, crashed on approach to Trinidad, killing eight of the nine people on board.

== Accident ==
The aircraft had taken off from El Trompillo Airport, Santa Cruz de la Sierra, for its hour-long, 380 kilometres (240 mi; 210 nmi) flight to Trinidad.

At about 19:00 local time (23:00 UTC) the aircraft was reported to be 19 kilometres (12 mi; 10 nmi) north of its destination when contact was lost. A search by the Bolivian Air Force was initiated. At around 12:30 local time on 8 September, the wreckage of the aircraft was spotted at a location 29 kilometres (18 mi; 16 nmi) north east of Trinidad Airport. Initial reports stated that there were no survivors.

Helicopters reached the crash site at 16:40 local time and it was discovered that eight of the nine people on board the aircraft had been killed in the crash. The survivor was discovered at around 09:00 local time on 9 September, having walked away from the wreckage in search of help. He sustained a head wound and severe bruising but did not have any broken bones. He was airlifted to a hospital.

A minute's silence was held in the Senate of Bolivia in memory of those who were killed.

== Aircraft ==
The aircraft involved was Fairchild SA227-BC Metro III, registration CP-2548, c/n BC-768B. The aircraft had first flown in 1992 and had served with several airlines before its sale to Aerocon in January 2009.

== Investigation ==
Bolivia's Directorate General of Civil Aviation opened an investigation into the accident. The cockpit voice recorder and flight data recorder were recovered from the wreckage and sent to Brazil for analysis.

It was reported in September 2011, that a required VOR radio beacon had been out of service since 20 August, 2011 and that the crew was attempting a non-precision approach at the time of the accident.
