= Guayaramerín Airport =

Airport in Bolivia

Cap. de Av. Emilio Beltrán Airport Guayaramerín Airport
- IATA: GYA; ICAO: SLGM

Summary
- Airport type: Public
- Serves: Guayaramerín, Bolivia
- Elevation AMSL: 459 ft / 140 m
- Coordinates: 10°53′20″S 65°22′50″W

Map
- Location of airport in Bolivia

Runways
| Direction | Length | | Surface |
| Direction | m | ft | Surface |
|---|---|---|---|
| 16/34 | 1,800 | 5,906 | Asphalt |
- Sources: SkyVector Google Maps

Capitán de Av. Emilio Beltrán Airport (IATA: GYA, ICAO: SLGM) is an airport serving the Mamoré River town of Guayaramerín in the Beni Department of Bolivia.

The airport is 5 kilometres (3.1 mi) south of Guayaramerín and replaces the former airport ((ICAO: SLGY)) near the river.

== Airlines and destinations ==
| Airlines | Destinations |
|---|---|
| EcoJet | Santa Cruz de la Sierra–Viru Viru, Trinidad |

== Accidents and incidents ==
- On 9 January 2012, a TAM flight from Riberalta Airport, Bolivia to Guayaramerín Airport operated by a Xian MA-60 FAB-96 landed with the undercarriage not deployed due to a fault, resulting in substantial damage to the aircraft. There were no injuries amongst the five crew members and sixteen passengers.

== See also ==
- Transport in Bolivia
- List of airports in Bolivia
