= 1976 Lloyd Aéreo Boliviano Boeing 707 crash =

Deadliest plane crash in Bolivia

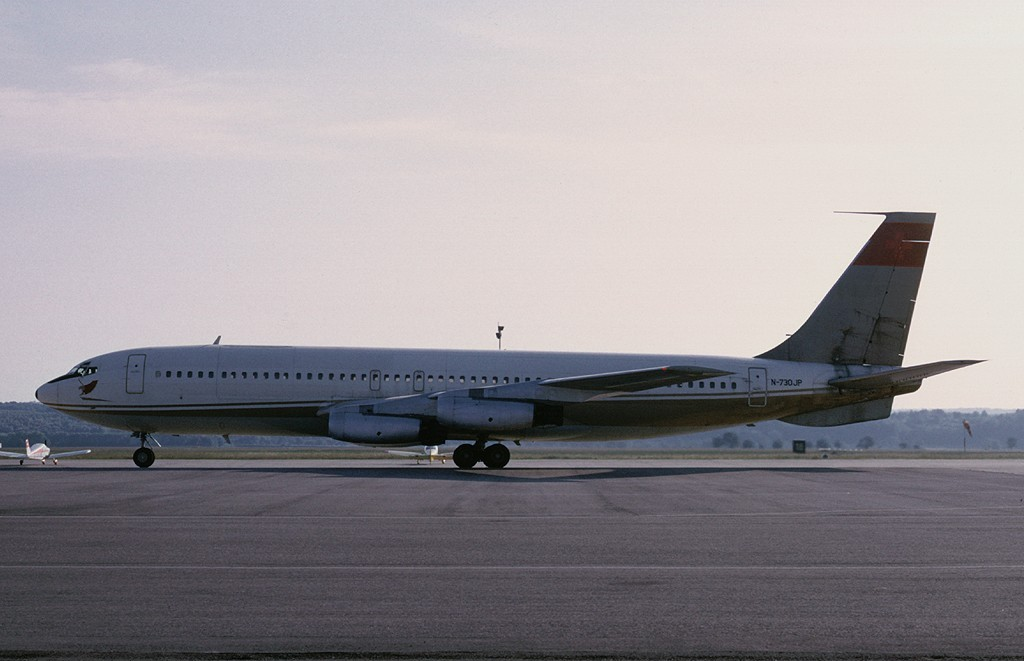
- N730JP, the aircraft involved in the accident, seen in 1975

Accident
- Date: 13 October 1976; 50 years ago
- Summary: Engine failure after takeoff, pilot error
- Site: Estadio Willy Bendeck, near El Trompillo Airport, Santa Cruz de la Sierra, Bolivia
- Total fatalities: 91 (Note: Although some sources indicate 91 fatalities, this is the most approximate number available.)
- Total injuries: over 100

Aircraft
- Aircraft type: Boeing 707-131F
- Operator: Jet Power Inc (owner), for Lloyd Aéreo Boliviano
- Registration: N730JP
- Flight origin: El Trompillo Airport, Santa Cruz de la Sierra, Bolivia
- Destination: Miami International Airport, Miami, Florida
- Occupants: 3
- Passengers: 0
- Crew: 3
- Fatalities: 3
- Survivors: 0

Ground casualties
- Ground fatalities: 88
- Ground injuries: over 100

On 13 October 1976, a Boeing 707, a chartered cargo aircraft operated for Lloyd Aéreo Boliviano (LAB) crashed shortly after takeoff at El Trompillo Airport, Santa Cruz de la Sierra, Bolivia, into a residential neighbourhood. All three crew on board were killed, along with 88 other fatalities on the ground, bringing the total up to 91. It is the deadliest air disaster to happen on Bolivian soil.

== Background ==
Lloyd Aéreo Boliviano, also known as LAB, was the flag carrier of Bolivia. It was founded in 1925, and it had been existing for 51 years at the time of the accident. The aircraft, a then 17 year old Boeing 707-131F (CN/MSN: 17671), manufactured 30 June 1959, was originally delivered to Trans World Airlines (TWA) on 14 July 1959, and was assigned its aircraft registration (or tail number) N744TW. In 1971, it was pulled out of TWA service, and then went through a 5-year period of constant leasing and returning; with some of the airlines being Ryan International Airlines and Air India. In October 1976, the aircraft was leased by LAB from its owner Jet Power Inc of Miami, Florida, by this time registered N730JP, and was put into charter service.

== Accident ==
On 13 October 1976, the Boeing 707 was scheduled for take-off at 13:30 hours (local time) from El Trompillo. The three American flight crew consisted of Captain Charles Baldwin, First Officer Lee Marsh, and Flight Engineer Leslie Bennett. As it was a cargo aircraft it had no passengers at the time of the crash. Its previous flight was from Houston, Texas to El Trompillo Airport, and had been carrying oil well machinery and other general cargo. The aeroplane struggled to get airborne, taking off close to the end of the runway. At 13:32, according to eyewitness accounts, there was an explosion and a fire in one of the left Pratt & Whitney J57 / JT3C engines before the plane crashed. It went through a busy street, then it crashed into a school and the south side of the Willy Bendeck stadium (current Ramón Tahuichi Aguilera Stadium) 560 meters from the end of the runway. The Boeing 707's left wing struck vegetation at 35 degrees, and then hit the ground upside down. 91 were killed, in over 100 were injured. According to a government spokesman, at least half of the dead were children because the plane crashed into a school.

== Cause ==
The Flight Data Recorder was not serviceable at the time of the crash, and the Cockpit Voice Recorder did not obtain much information, as the cockpit microphone was inoperative. It was determined that improper flight preparation due to pilot fatigue was the main cause of the accident. Unlike the reports, the witnesses say that an engine failed during takeoff, which meant that the aircraft had insufficient thrust to stay airborne.

== Aftermath ==
As soon as news of the crash spread out, the Bolivian president and his wife rushed to the crash scene, while Bolivian doctors were sent to aid the injured. The U.S. Ambassador authorized the use of $25,000 for purchasing 5,000 pounds of supplies. Six members of the U.S. Military Burn Team, along with two FAA and four NTSB representatives, were sent to the crash site to assist those injured by the crash. Other countries such as Brazil and Germany sent medical teams and cash to help assist victims and repair damages.

== See also ==
- Sudan Airways Flight 2241
- Aeroservicios Ecuatorianos Flight 767-103
- Nigeria Airways Flight 2120
