= Fairchild Swearingen Metroliner =

Small airliner and executive aircraft family by Swearingen, later Fairchild

Metroliner
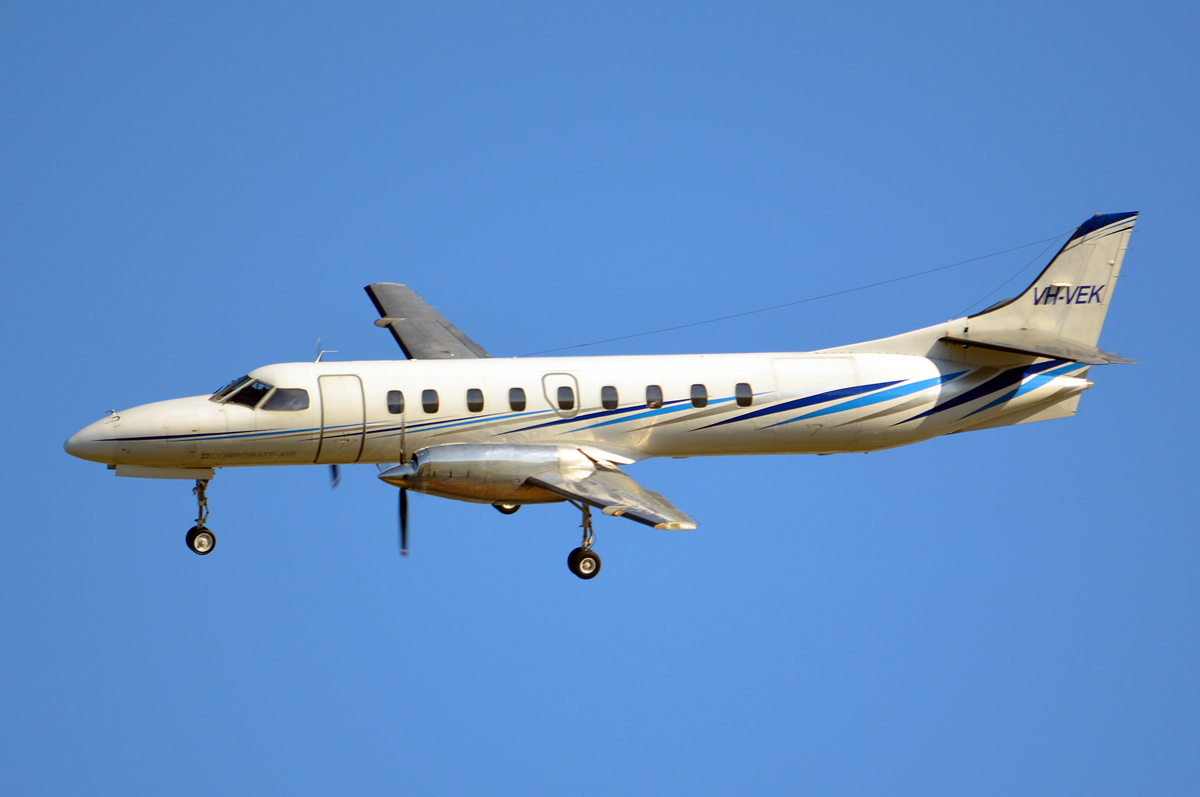
- The Metro is a low wing, twin turboprop, small airliner with a retractable undercarriage

General information
- Type: Regional airliner
- Manufacturer: Fairchild
- Status: In service
- Primary users: Ameriflight Perimeter Aviation; Sharp Airlines; Aeronaves TSM
- Number built: >600

History
- Manufactured: 1968–2001
- Introduction date: 1972
- First flight: August 26, 1969
- Developed from: Swearingen Merlin
- Variant: Fairchild C-26 Metroliner

The Fairchild Swearingen Metroliner (previously the Swearingen Metro and later Fairchild Aerospace Metro) is a 19-seat, pressurized, twin-turboprop airliner first produced by Swearingen Aircraft and later by Fairchild Aircraft at a plant in San Antonio, Texas.

== Design ==
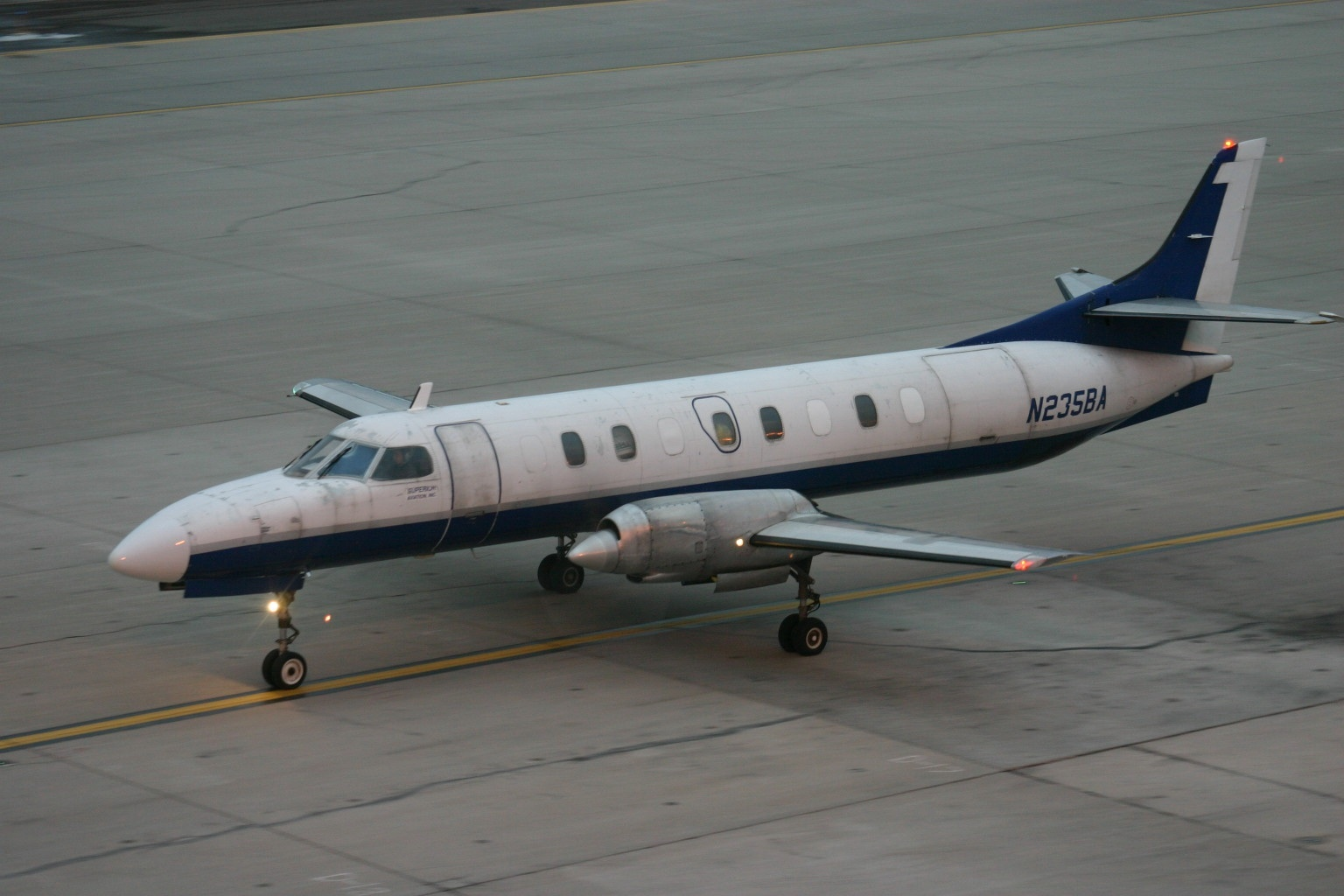
A Metro II converted for cargo with a large freight door on the left side at the rear.

The Metroliner was an evolution of the Swearingen Merlin turboprop-powered business aircraft. Ed Swearingen, a Texas fixed-base operator and aeronautical engineer, started the developments that led to the Metro through gradual modifications to the Beechcraft Twin Bonanza and Queen Air business aircraft, which he dubbed Excalibur.

A new fuselage (but with a similar nose) and vertical fin were then developed, married to salvaged and rebuilt (wet) Queen Air wings and horizontal tails, and Twin Bonanza landing gear; this became the SA26 Merlin, more or less a pressurized Excalibur. Through successive models (the SA26-T Merlin IIA and SA26-AT Merlin IIB) the engines were changed to Pratt & Whitney Canada PT6, then Garrett TPE331 turboprops. These were marketed as business aircraft seating eight to ten passengers.

An all-new aircraft was built and named the SA226-T Merlin III with a new nose, wings, landing gear, cruciform horizontal tail (Note: This and subsequent Merlin and Metro models have a trimmable horizontal stabilizer (THS) usually used on jet aircraft, one of only a small number of turboprop aircraft to have this design feature (the competing Beechcraft Model 99 being another).) and inverted inlet Garrett engines. Ultimately a stretch of the Merlin III was designed, sized to seat 22 passengers and called the SA226-TC Metro. Because FAA regulations limited an airliner to no more than 19 seats if no flight attendant was to be carried, the aircraft was optimized for that number of passengers, with 4 feet and 9 inches of headroom within the passenger cabin. The standard engines offered were two TPE331-3UW turboprops driving three-bladed propellers. A corporate version called the SA226-AT Merlin IVA was also marketed and initially sales of this version were roughly double that of the Metro.

== Development ==
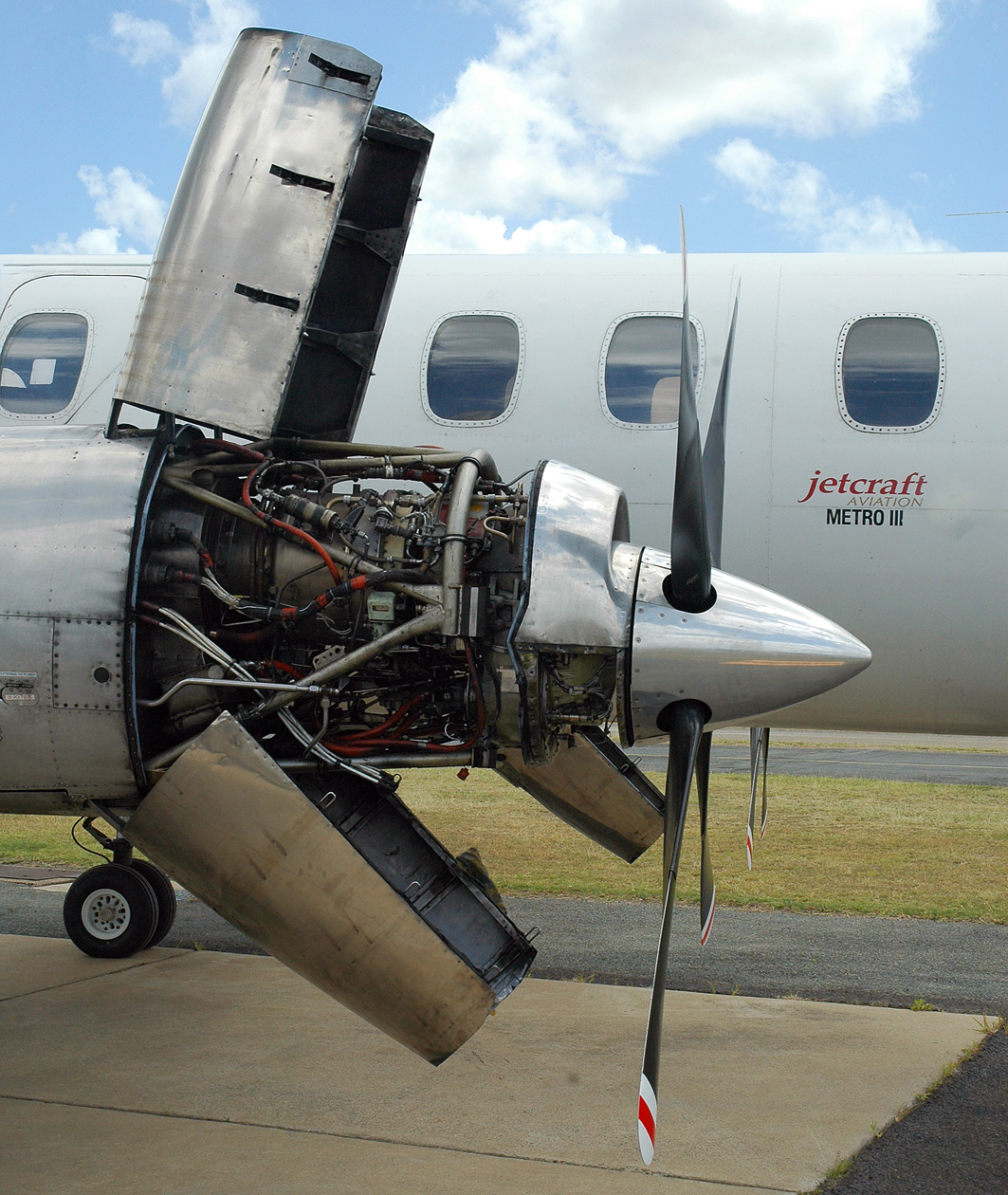
The Garrett TPE331 installation

Prototype construction of the Metro began in 1968 and the first flight was on August 26, 1969. Swearingen Aircraft encountered financial difficulties at this stage, and late in 1971 Fairchild (which was marketing the Metro and building its wings and engine nacelles), bought 90% of Swearingen and the company was renamed Swearingen Aviation Corporation. At this point, the previously cash-strapped company was able to put the Metro into production.

In 1974, the original Metro models were replaced by the SA226-TC Metro II after about 20 Metros and about 30 Merlin IVAs had been built. (Note: The article "Final Metro Delivery" in Airways magazine Issue 64 states that Metro deliveries totalled 18. The Metro production list shows that by the end of 1974, 22 Merlins had been built.) Among the changes made were larger, squared-oval windows and optionally, a small rocket-assisted take off engine in the tail cone, to improve takeoff performance out of "hot & high" airfields in the event of an engine failure.

The Metro and Metro II were limited to a maximum weight of 12,500 pounds (5,700 kg) by the requirements of the Special Federal Regulation 23 that the aircraft had been certified against. The Metro II was re-certified as the Metro IIA in 1980 with a maximum weight of 13,100 pounds (5,900 kg) and the Metro II's TPE331-3 engines replaced by -10 engines of increased power.

The SA227-AC Metro III followed, also initially certified in 1980 for up to 14,000 pounds (6,400 kg), increasing to 14,500 pounds (6,600 kg) as engines and structures were upgraded. An option for up to 16,000 pounds (7,300 kg) was offered. Among external improvements to the Metro III were a 10 ft (3.0 m) increase in wing span, four-bladed props, redesigned "quick-access" engine cowlings and numerous drag-reducing airframe modifications, including landing gear doors that closed after the gear was extended.

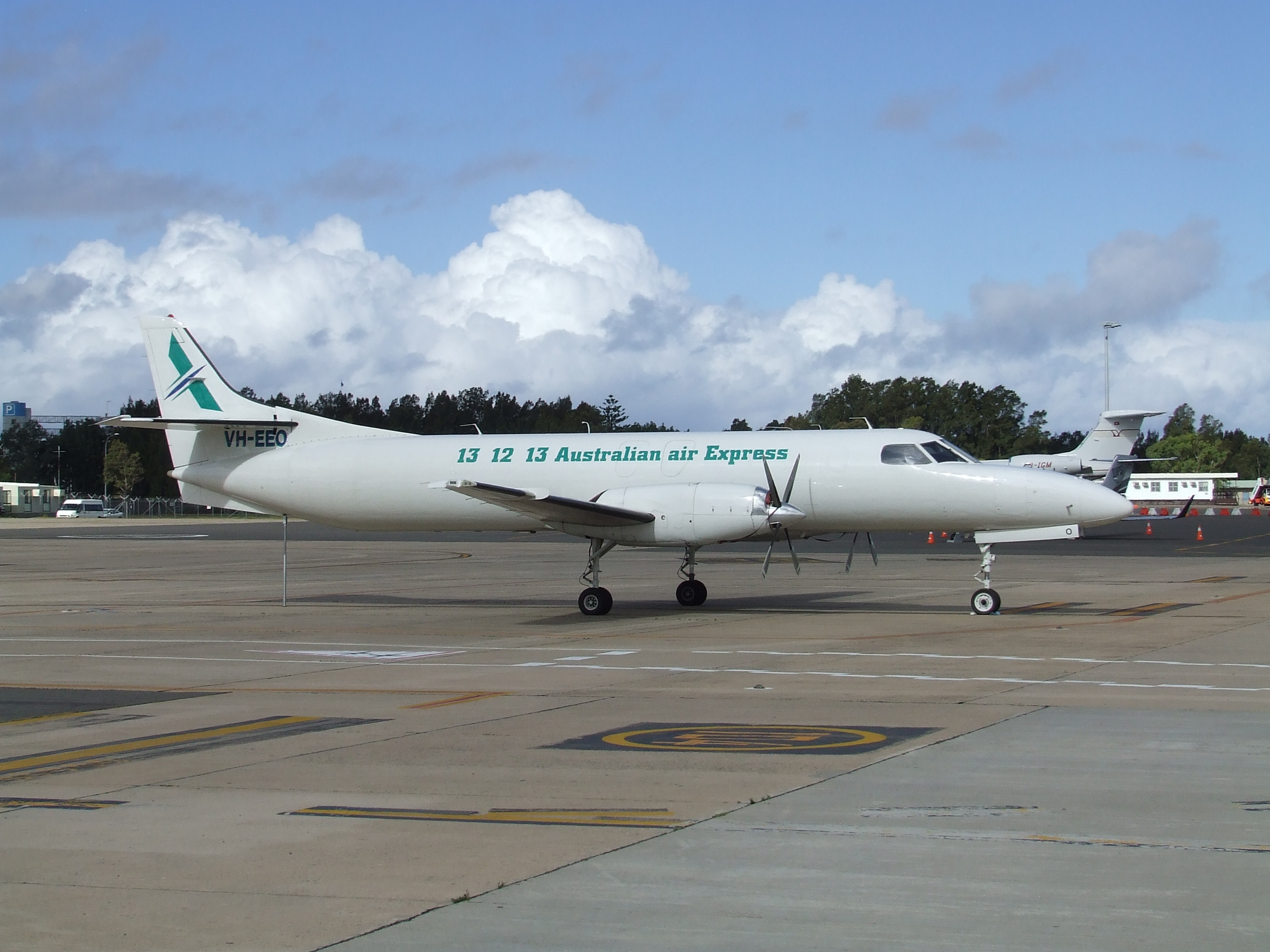
A purpose-built SA227-AT Expediter freighter without cabin windows

Once again a corporate version was offered as the Merlin IVC (the model name chosen to align with the contemporaneous short-fuselage Merlin IIIC). A version with strengthened floors and the high gross weight option was offered as a cargo aircraft known as the Expediter. Both the Expediter and the Merlin IVC were designated the SA227-AT. Finally, due to reliability problems with Garrett engines in the second half of the 1980s, the Metro IIIA was offered with two Pratt & Whitney Canada PT6A-45R turboprops in place of the Garrett units but none were actually delivered. A special model was the SA227-BC Metro III built for Mexican airline AeroLitoral, which took delivery of 15 of the 18 of this model that were produced.

Improvements beyond the Metro III provided better systems, more power and a further increase in takeoff weight. This design effort resulted in the SA227 CC (for Commuter Category) and SA227-DC models, initially called the Metro IV then renamed Metro 23, so named as they were designed for certification under FAR Part 23 (Amendment 34) standards. A Metro 23 EF with an external pod under the lower fuselage for greater baggage capacity was also offered as well as an Expediter 23 and Merlin 23. The SA227-CC was an interim model with TPE331-11U engines and only a handful were built.

=== Further development ===
In the 1960s, Swearingen Aircraft developed a prototype SA-28T eight-seat jet aircraft with a flapless delta wing. It shared the tail and cockpit with the Merlin/Metro. The two engines were to be Garrett TFE731 turbofans then in development; they were originally to be mounted on the aft fuselage, however during the course of design work their location was moved to under the high-mounted wing. Early flights were to be undertaken with General Electric CJ610 engines fitted. Development continued after Fairchild acquired the company, but the project was shut down nine weeks from first flight. It was later cut up as scrap and the fuselage used as a Metro display at trade shows.

At the 1987 Paris Air Show, Fairchild released details of proposed developments of the Metro designated the Metro V and Metro VI. These versions would have featured a longer fuselage with a taller "stand-up" cabin providing 69 in (180 cm) of interior height for passengers; a redesigned, longer wing; engines moved further out on the wing from the fuselage; a "T-tail" and various system improvements. A Merlin V corporate version of the Metro V was also planned. The Metro V was to be fitted with the same engines as the Metro 23 and the Metro VI was to be fitted with more powerful TPE331-14 engines. The Metro VI was shelved within months of being announced due to a lack of customer interest, but Fairchild did not proceed with the Metro V either.

One version that did see the light of day was the Metro 25, which featured an increased passenger capacity of 25 at the expense of the baggage space found in earlier models; the deletion of the left rear cargo door, the addition of a passenger door on the right-hand rear fuselage, and a belly pod for baggage. A Metro III was converted as a Metro 25 demonstrator, it flew in this configuration in October 1989. Also mooted but not built was the Metro 25J, which would have been another jet-powered aircraft with TFE731s in over-wing pods.

The type certificates for Metro and Merlin aircraft are currently held by M7 Aerospace.

== Operational history ==
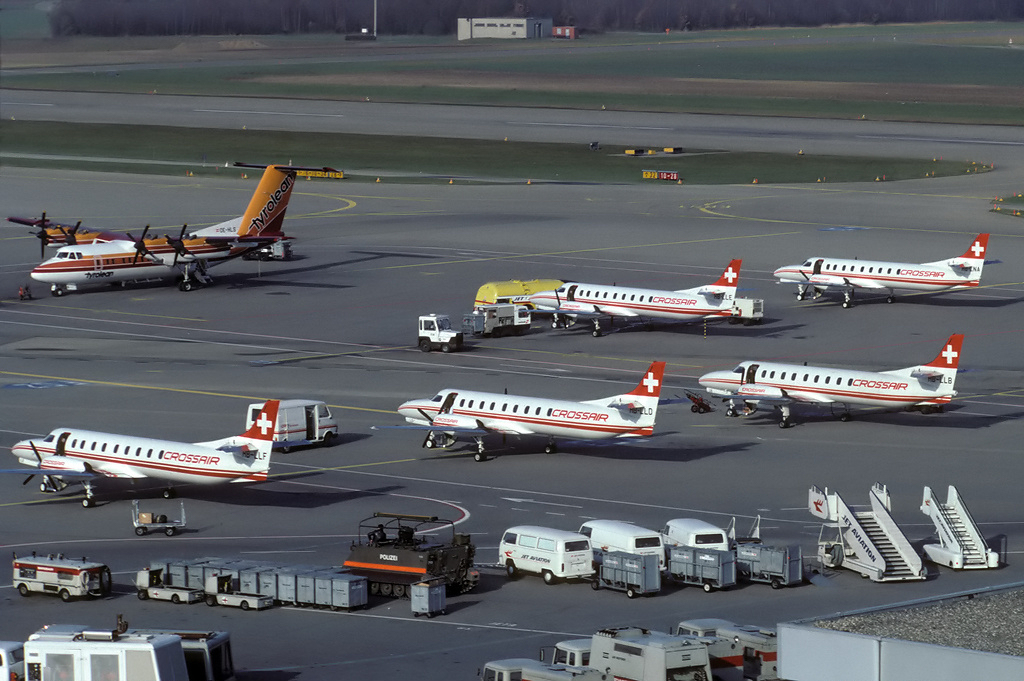
Five of Crossair's nine SA-227s at Zurich 1981

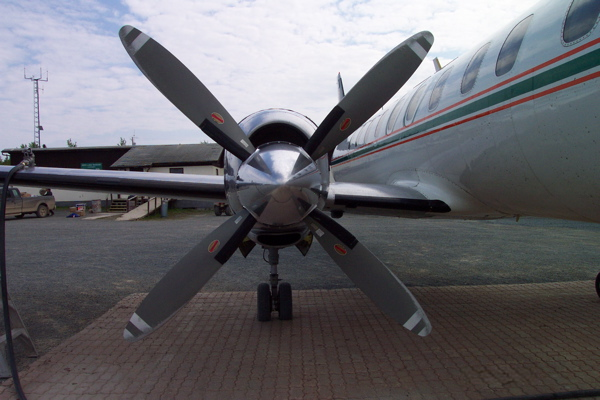
One of the advantages of the Perimeter Aviation modifications was using a four-bladed propeller that was less susceptible to stone chips on gravel runways

Two of the original Metro model were delivered in 1972 to Société Minière de Bakwanga (MIBA) in Kinshasa, Zaire, the first customer to put the Metro into service. The first airline to put them into service was Commuter Airlines in January 1973, followed shortly after by Air Wisconsin.

At least one Metro IIA flies in Canada with Perimeter Aviation. Two SA227-CCs are today registered with Canadian operator Bearskin Lake Air Service Ltd., while another two are operating in New Zealand. A fifth also flew with Bearskin Airlines, but was destroyed in a mid-air collision in 1995.

In service with Perimeter Aviation in Canada, this long-term operator of the Metro II and III made a number of modifications to suit its use in northern and remote Canadian sites where rudimentary gravel "strips" were common. Some of the many innovative changes to the design of the Metro allowed the aircraft to fly more efficiently, as well as cutting down on the "noise factor" that was attributed to the early models. The airline installed Garrett engines with quieter and more efficient four-bladed Hartzell propellers. More recently, in 2016, 5-blade composite propellers are being installed, further enhancing performance and reducing noise levels. Their Metros are also all equipped with modern avionics suites, including the recent installation of Garmin 950 glass cockpits and GPS satellite tracking.

Many of the improvements resulting in the Metro 23 came about during work to produce the military C-26B model for the United States Air Force.

A Metro III aircraft was modified for the Colombian Air Force for counternarcotics reconnaissance purposes. The Colombian National Police also operates several Metro 23 aircraft for counternarcotics reconnaissance purposes. In addition, the Peruvian Air Force operates a Metro 23 and the Trinidad and Tobago Coast Guard operates a Metro III, both similarly configured. A "Regional Security System" Metro III with a large belly radome has been seen in the Caribbean.

In civilian service the type has proved to be popular, with sales in the 19-seat airliner market rivalled only by the Beechcraft 1900. (Note: The long-fuselage SA226/SA227 series has slightly outsold the Beechcraft 1900 series, but many were built as Merlin corporate aircraft. The similarly sized de Havilland Canada DHC-6 Twin Otter has outsold both types but is a different class of aircraft.) It is especially popular in Australia. Since the first example (a Merlin IVA) arrived in 1975, almost 20% of the fleet has operated there, and, as of December 2008, 61 Metros and Expediters are registered in Australia, more than all of its market rivals combined.

Metro production ended in 1998; by this time, regional jets were in vogue and turboprop types were out of favour with airlines. At the time, several airframes remained unsold at the factory. In 2001, the last aircraft, Metro 23 c/n DC-904B, was finally delivered to National Jet Aviation Services of Zelienople, Pennsylvania, an air charter operator. A total of 703 Metro, Expediter, Merlin IV series and C-26 series aircraft were built. In addition, 158 other SA226- and SA227-series aircraft were built as short-fuselage Merlin IIIs, IIIAs and IIIBs. (Note: 123 SA226-Ts (of which 31 were Merlin IIIBs built with assigned C/Ns intermingled with those of Metro IIs), and Merlin IIICs and 300s (35 SA227-TTs, of which 25 were IIICs and 10 were 300s; again with assigned C/Ns intermingled with Metros, in this case Metro III/Merlin IVCs). In addition, three SA226-ATs were converted on the production line as SA226-TCs; four SA226-TCs were similarly converted as SA226-ATs; and one short-fuselage SA227-TT was converted as a long-fuselage SA227-AC. These eight aircraft each had two different constructor's numbers of various model names.)

== Variants ==
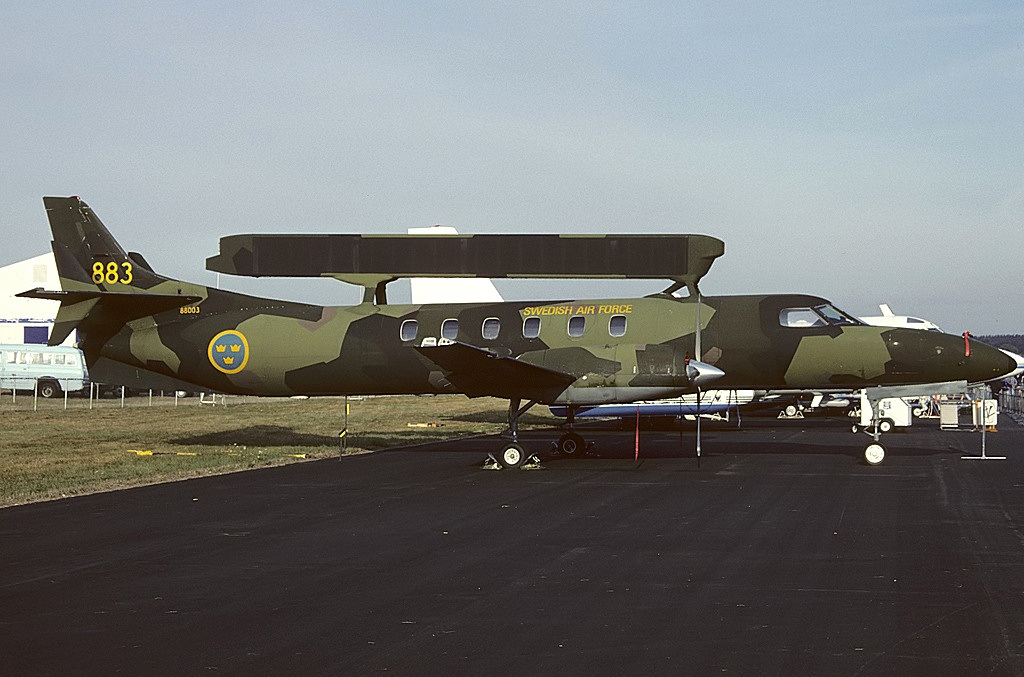
This Metro III was used in Sweden for Erieye/FS-890 AEW trials.

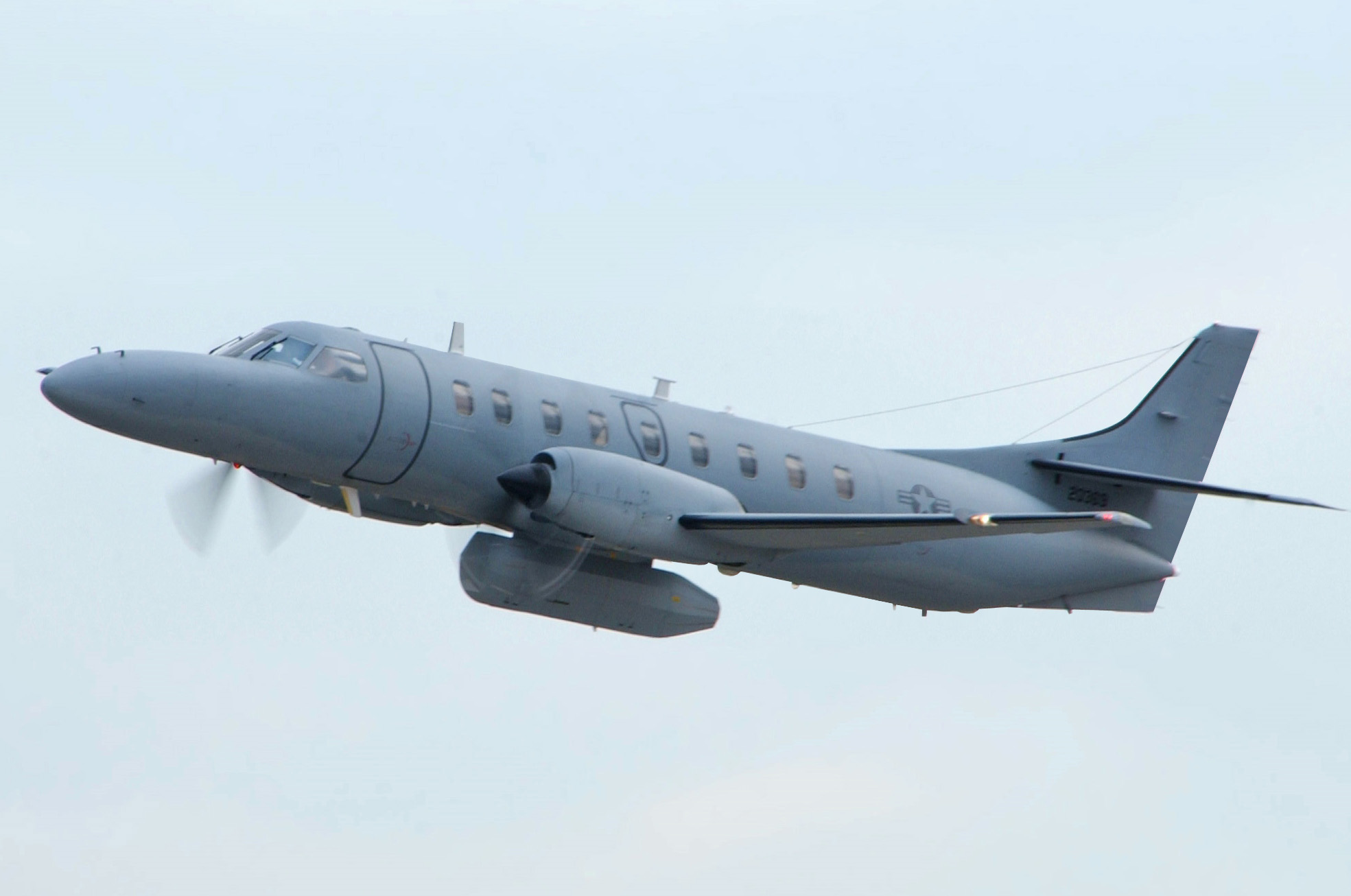
Fairchild RC-26 with a ventral radar

=== SA226 series ===
- SA226-TC Metro and Metro II - 198 built
- SA226-AT Merlin IVA - 56 built

=== SA227 series ===
- Metro III - 291 built
  - SA227-AC - 273 built (11 to US Armed Forces as C-26As)
  - SA227-BC - 18 built (3 to US Armed Forces as C-26Bs)
- SA227-AT - 43 built
  - Merlin IVC - 21 built
  - Expediter - 22 built
- Metro 23 - 115 built
  - SA227-CC- 5 built
  - SA227-DC - 110 built (37 to U.S. Armed Forces as C-26Bs)

=== Military ===
- Fairchild C-26 Metroliner - C-26A, C-26B and RC-26B versions for the U.S. military.
- TP 88 - Metro III (two aircraft) delivered to the Swedish Air Force for use as a VIP transports. The first was delivered in 1984, and this was replaced by the second (TP 88B) in 1986 and remained in use until 1993. A third dubbed TP 88C, was acquired in 1987 and was used for Erieye/FS-890 AEW trials.

== Operators ==
As of July 2019, 196 Metroliners were in airline service; airline operators with three or more aircraft were:

- 45: Ameriflight
- 32: Perimeter Aviation
- 28: Aeronaves TSM
- 17: Key Lime Air
- 16: Sharp Airlines
- 10: Encore Air Cargo
- 5: Flightline
- 4: Carson Air
- 3: Berry Aviation
- 3: Swiftair Hellas
- 5: Bin Air
- 5: Skippers Aviation
- 3: Casair
- 3: Link Airways

== Aircraft on display ==
- N566UP - SA227-AT Merlin IV C Expediter, built in San Antonio, Texas in October 1983. On display at Texas Air Museum – Stinson Chapter.
- SA227 On display at Motorization Museum in Oława in Oława (near Wrocław), Poland.

== Accidents and incidents ==
Metroliner schematic

- On June 12, 1980, a Metro II operating as Air Wisconsin Flight 965 suffered engine failure following massive water ingestion during a thunderstorm; the crew lost control and crashed near Valley, Nebraska. Both crew members and 11 passengers died; two passengers survived with serious injuries.
- On January 30, 1984, a Metro II operated by Britt Airways crashed shortly after takeoff from Terre Haute, Indiana, on a repositioning flight to Evansville, Indiana. Three Britt employees, including its Director of Operations and Chief Pilot, were killed. The plane, N63Z, was destroyed. The cause was undetermined.
- On January 15, 1987, a Metro II operating as Skywest Airlines Flight 1834 collided with a single engine Mooney M-20 near Kearns, Utah. All eight people on the Metro II and both pilots on the Mooney were killed in the accident.
- On January 19, 1988, a Fairchild Metro III, operated by Trans-Colorado Airlines as Continental Express Flight 2286, crashed near Bayfield, Colorado. Both crew members and seven of the 15 passengers died. Of the surviving passengers, only one was uninjured.
- On February 8, 1988, a Metro III operating as Nürnberger Flugdienst Flight 108 suffered a lightning strike, following which the electrical system failed. The right wing separated from the aircraft during an uncontrolled descent and the aircraft disintegrated and crashed near Kettwig, Germany. Both crew members and all 19 passengers died; the deadliest accident involving the Fairchild Metroliner.
- On February 19, 1988, a Fairchild Metro operating as AVAir Flight 3378 crashed one mile from the runway after takeoff from Raleigh-Durham International Airport, North Carolina killing both crew members and all 10 passengers. Pilot error was found to be the cause.
- On January 21, 1989, a Fairchild Metro II (OY-ARI) operating a charter flight attempted to make an emergency landing with one engine at Örnsköldsvik (OER) in IFR conditions but failed to feather the propeller making it hard to line up with the runway. The aircraft crashed in deep snow 30 m left of the runway injuring one passenger and destroying the aircraft.
- On September 26, 1989, Skylink Airlines Flight 070, a Fairchild Metro III was on a scheduled flight from Vancouver (YVR) to Terrace (YXT), British Columbia with two pilots and five passengers on board. The aircraft crashed one quarter mile to the west of Terrace Airport while the crew was attempting to carry out a missed approach in IFR conditions. The aircraft was destroyed by the impact and a post-crash fire. All seven occupants were killed in the crash.
- On February 1, 1991, SkyWest Airlines Flight 5569, operated with a Metro III, was waiting on a runway at Los Angeles International Airport when USAir Flight 1493 collided with it, resulting in the death of the ten passengers and two crew members on board the Metro.
- On August 25, 1992, a Lone Star Airlines Swearingen SA 227-AC Metro III on a test flight crashed after takeoff 1 km SE of Memorial Field Airport due to improper maintenance of all primary flight control cables. All three occupants were killed.
- On May 1, 1995, a Metro 23 operating as Bearskin Airlines Flight 362 (with a crew of two and one passenger on board) collided at 4,500 feet above sea level with an Air Sandy Piper PA-31 Navajo (with one pilot and four passengers on board) while on approach to Sioux Lookout Airport, destroying both aircraft and killing all persons on both aircraft.
- On September 16, 1995, a Tamair Metro III, VH-NEJ, crashed shortly after takeoff from Tamworth, NSW, Australia, killing two trainees, with the check and training captain surviving with serious injuries. There were no other passengers or crew. The crash occurred following a "V1 cut" at night and raised many questions regarding the safety of asymmetric training operations at night.
- On June 18, 1998, Propair Flight 420, a Metro II flying from Dorval International Airport (now Montreal-Trudeau International Airport) to Peterborough Airport in Peterborough, Ontario, experienced a left wheel well fire when the overheated brake and wheel assembly was retracted into the enclosed wheel well. The heat dissipated to the tire and the surrounding structures, eventually causing a fire. During the attempted emergency landing at Mirabel Airport, the landing gear was extended on short final and when the aircraft was over the runway, the left wing broke upwards, the fuselage pivoted to the left and struck the ground. All 11 occupants were killed.
- On February 8, 2001, a Swearingen SA227 "Merlin" plane owned by Northern Illinois Flight Center that was landing from Chicago disappeared for 15 hours. Paul Welke, the owner of Island Airways, then flew as part of the rescue operation, finding 42 year old Mirth Gault and her children, ages 13, 9 and 5, alive next to the crashed aircraft debris. The crash killed both crew members.
- On October 10, 2001, a Merlin IVA operating as Flightline Flight 101 from Spain to Algeria crashed into the Mediterranean Sea off the Columbretes Islands in Valencia, Spain, killing all 10 people on board.
- On December 24, 2002, a North Flying Swearingen Metroliner III contracted to Ben Air for mail services crashed right after takeoff at Aberdeen Airport in Scotland. The aircraft slid along a field, through a fence, and onto a road, where it struck a car. Both pilots and all occupants of the car survived. It was found that a bird strike occurred, but the accident was attributed to inappropriate crew actions.
- On May 3, 2005, a Metro III operating a cargo flight as Airwork Flight 23 broke up in midair and crashed near Stratford, New Zealand. Both crew members died.
- On May 7, 2005, a Transair Metro 23 crashed near Lockhart River, north of Cooktown, Queensland in Australia. A total of 15 people died in what is, as of December 2009, the worst airline crash in Australia since the 1960s.
- On June 19, 2008, a Fairchild SA-226 Merlin, a coastguard airframe, was being used to conduct pilot flight-skills tests for the Trondheim-based operator Helitrans, the pilots lost control during a stall exercise, and just 37 seconds after the control loss, and with an eventual sink rate of 10,000 ft/min, the turboprop hit the sea in a near-horizontal attitude, 18 nm west of Bergen, killing all three on board.
- On February 10, 2011, Manx2 Flight 7100, a Metro III owned by the Spanish airline Air Lada operating on behalf of Manx2, was on a flight from Belfast, Northern Ireland to Cork, Ireland. The aircraft crashed on landing in fog, resulting in the death of six people.
- On September 6, 2011, Aerocon Flight 238 from El Trompillo Airport, Santa Cruz de la Sierra, Bolivia to Teniente Jorge Henrich Arauz Airport, Trinidad, Bolivia crashed on approach to Trinidad. The flight was operated by Swearingen SA-227 Metroliner CP-2548. Eight of the nine people on board were killed.
- On June 6, 2012, a SA227-C metro en route from Montevideo Carrasco, MVD to Buenos Aires Ezeiza (EZE) crashed into the Rio de la Plata close to the coast of Montevideo south of Flores Island. It was registered as CX-LAS operating a freight flight on behalf of DHL.
- On November 3, 2013, Aerocon Flight 25, a SA227-BC Metro III, registration CP-2477, crashed when it was trying to land at Riberalta Airport (northern Bolivia) killing eight of the 18 people on board.
- On November 10, 2013, Bearskin Airlines Flight 311, a Swearingen SA227-AC Metro III, crashed on final approach to its destination of Red Lake, Ontario, Canada en route from Sioux Lookout, Ontario. The aircraft experienced a near total failure of the left engine at 500 ft AGL which, combined with the aircraft being in the landing configuration, caused a loss of airspeed resulting in an unrecoverable situation. Safety systems to assist in the handling with one engine out did not activate since the engine did not completely shut down; the scenario gave conflicting information to the pilots who did not have time to identify the nature of the failure. Two crew members and three passengers were killed in the crash. Two passengers sustained injuries but survived.
- On December 2, 2013, a Metroliner property of IBC Airways, flying from Las Américas International Airport, Dominican Republic, crashed in the municipality of Arecibo, Puerto Rico. Two people were killed in the accident.
- On April 13, 2015, a Carson Air SA-226 Metro II, operating Carson Air Flight 66, disappeared somewhere in the North Shore Mountains after taking off from Vancouver International Airport for Prince George Airport. Debris was found near the area where the aircraft was last tracked.
- On June 2, 2015, an Aeronaves TSM Fairchild (Swearingen) SA226TC Metro II, registration XA-UKP (msn TC-376 built 1980) crashed shortly after take-off from Querétaro international airport, Querétaro State, Mexico.
- On October 24, 2016, a CAE Aviation SA227-AT Merlin IVC crashed shortly after take-off from Malta International Airport. All five people on board were killed. The aircraft was taking part in a French-led surveillance operation to counter people-smuggling.
- On December 6, 2016, a Swearingen SA227-AC Metro III cargo plane, operating as Key Lime Air flight LYM308, crashed north of Pelham, Georgia, USA, on a flight from Panama City, Florida to Albany, Georgia. The pilot, the sole occupant, was killed. Weather in the area was poor, with a thunderstorm in the vicinity of the destination airport.
- On March 29, 2018, a flight operated by the former airline Amaszonas, also using a Fairchild Swearingen Metroliner, suffered an accident after colliding with birds and crashing near a highway. However, all occupants survived, with only one person sustaining an ankle injury.
- On February 24, 2020, a Fairchild SA227-DC Metro 23 aircraft, operated by Perimeter Aviation as Bearskin Airlines Flight 344, crashed about 4:10 p.m. CT at Dryden airport in Ontario. Transportation Safety Board of Canada investigations found pilot error was the result due to an incomplete pre-taxi checklist. The aircraft left the runway while taxiing and crashed into a snowbank at speed with left propeller fragments penetrating the aircraft interior and injuring passengers. Multiple passengers were injured but there were no fatalities.
- On May 12, 2021, a Cirrus SR22 N416DJ and Key Lime Air Flight 970, a Swearingen SA-226-TC Metro II N280KL collided on approach to Centennial Airport in Colorado. The Cirrus made a safe off-airport parachute-assisted landing, while the Key Lime pilot landed safely at Centennial despite the loss of a section of the cabin roof and damage to the empennage. There were no injuries.
- On December 10, 2021, a SA 227-DC Metroliner, operating as Castle Aviation Flight 921, crashed in Bedford, New Hampshire, on approach to nearby Manchester-Boston Regional Airport. The pilot was the only person on board the plane, which was delivering medical supplies. The sole occupant was killed.
- On November 15, 2022, an SA227-AT Expediter crashed on the Western Lakes Golf Club in Pewaukee, Wisconsin, 6 km short of Runway 10 at Waukesha County Airport. The plane was flying from New Orleans to Waukesha to deliver dogs to the Humane Animal Welfare Society of Waukesha. All three persons and all 53 dogs on the aircraft survived.

== Specifications (Metro III) ==
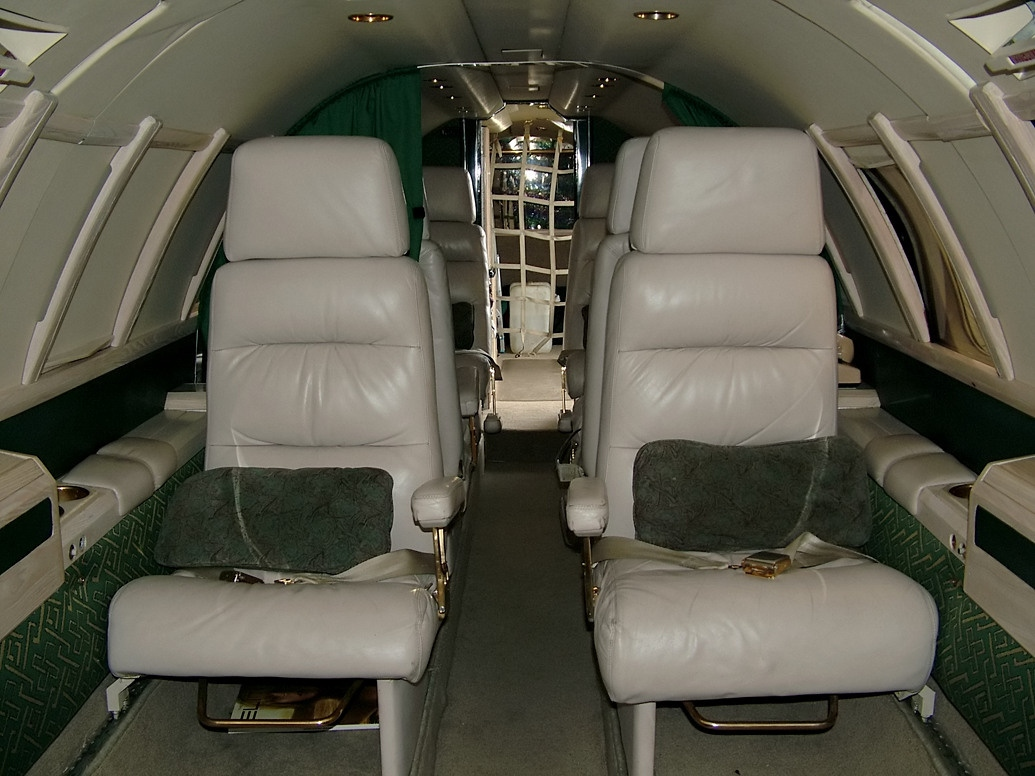
One-by-one seating, the cabin does not allow standing up unless one is incredibly short

Data from The Encyclopedia of World Aircraft.

General characteristics

- Crew: 2 (captain & first officer), 1 in cargo-only configuration
- Capacity: 19 passengers
- Length: 59 ft 4 in (18.08 m)
- Wingspan: 57 ft 0 in (17.37 m)
- Height: 16 ft 8 in (5.08 m)
- Wing area: 310 sq ft (29 m^{2})
- Airfoil: NACA 65A215
- Empty weight: 8,737 lb (3,963 kg)
- Max takeoff weight: 14,500–16,000 lb (6,577–7,257 kg) depending on model (Note: The 14,500 lb (6,577 kg) model may be modified to a max weight of 15,000 lb (6,804 kg), but the landing weight for that model remains at 14,000 lb (6,350 kg).)
- Powerplant: 2 × Garrett AiResearch TPE-331 (Note: -11U-601G, -611G or -612G depending on propeller fitted) turboprop engines, 1,000 shp (750 kW) each or 1,100 shp (820 kW) each with alcohol-water injection
- Propellers: 4-bladed McCauley 4HFR34C652 or Dowty Rotol R.321/4-82-F/8

Performance

- Maximum speed: 311 kn (358 mph, 576 km/h)
- Cruise speed: 278 kn (320 mph, 515 km/h)
- Range: 594 nmi (684 mi, 1,100 km)
- Service ceiling: 25,000 ft (7,600 m)

== See also ==
Related development

- Swearingen Merlin
- Fairchild C-26 Metroliner

Aircraft of comparable role, configuration, and era

- Beechcraft 1900
- British Aerospace Jetstream
- Embraer EMB 110 Bandeirante
- Dornier 228

Related lists

- List of military aircraft of the United States
