= Skylink Airlines Flight 070 =

1989 plane crash in British Columbia, Canada

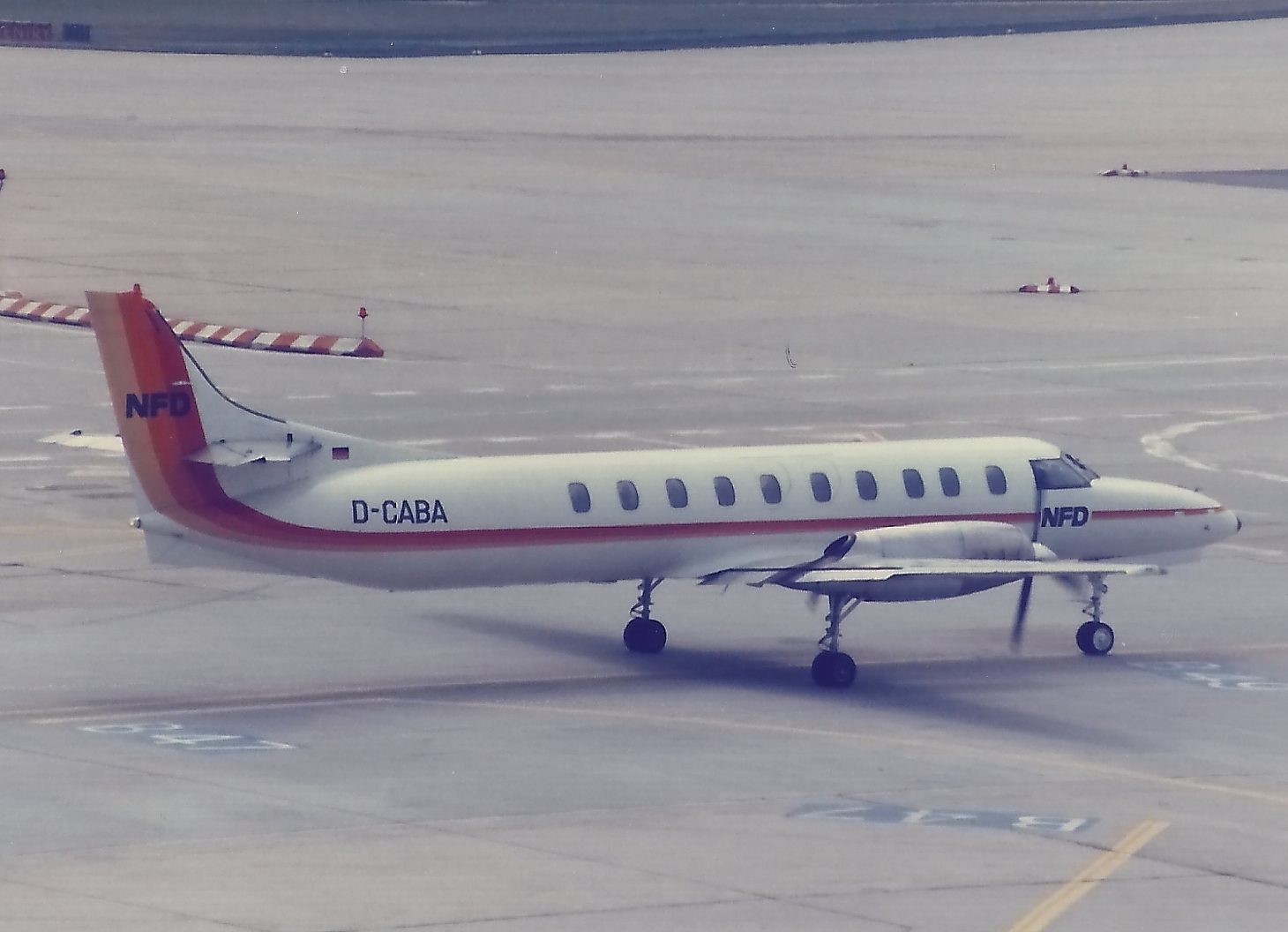
- The aircraft involved in the accident, photographed in 1985 while in service with Nürnberger Flugdienst

Accident
- Date: 26 September 1989
- Summary: Controlled flight into terrain caused by pilot error
- Site: Northwest Regional Airport Terrace-Kitimat, British Columbia, Canada

Aircraft
- Aircraft type: Swearingen SA227-AC Metro III
- Operator: Skylink Airlines
- Registration: C-GSLB
- Flight origin: Vancouver International Airport, British Columbia, Canada
- Destination: Northwest Regional Airport Terrace-Kitimat, British Columbia, Canada
- Occupants: 7
- Passengers: 5
- Crew: 2
- Fatalities: 7
- Survivors: 0

Skylink Airlines Flight 070 was a regularly scheduled charter flight from Vancouver to Terrace, British Columbia, Canada. On September 26, 1989, the Swearingen SA227-AC Metro lll operating the flight crashed prior to landing at Northwest Regional Airport. Both pilots and 5 passengers onboard were killed. The investigation found that the pilots mishandled a missed approach in IFR conditions and continued the approach without getting visual confirmation of the runway. As well, they became spatially disoriented during the go-around procedure, which caused the aircraft to enter a dive and impact the ground.

== Aircraft and crew ==
The aircraft involved was a Swearingen SA227-AC Metro lll (serial number 481), registration C-GSLB, built in 1981. It had a total of 11,177 flight hours prior to the accident. The crew consisted of a 33 year old captain who had accumulated a total of 2981 flying hours, of which 659 were on the accident aircraft type and a total of 291 flight hours in the past 90 days. The 28 year old first officer had accumulated a total of 1298 flight hours, of which 240 were on the accident aircraft type and a total of 302 flight hours in the past 90 days. The two had flown together numerous times and were well-certified and trained on the Metro lll.

== Accident ==
The flight was scheduled to take off at 6:30 pm local time, but for undetermined reasons, returned to the terminal, causing a 21 minute delay in the departure time. The flight took off at 6:51 pm local time. The flight was uneventful until the approach into Terrace. At 8:11 PDT, the crew requested a descent clearance to 15,000 feet. At the moment there was thick fog at the airports location. They had to circle and wait as a Learjet flying ahead had missed its first approach to runway 27 at Terrace Airport and was granted a second approach clearance. However, plans changed as at 8:20 PDT, the Learjet landed on Runway 15 without having to execute this approach. Flight 070 was then given clearance to land on runway 27. The crew decided to execute a circling approach onto runway 27. During the descent, at an altitude of 6800 feet, the aircraft was configured for landing and all final checks were complete. After crossing the Terrace non-directional beacon at 1650 feet, the crew confirmed visual contact with the ground. At 8:27 PDT, at an altitude of 1200 feet, the captain stated "Runway in sight", seeing the lights of runway 27 ahead. Witnesses on the ground reported the aircraft descending steadily and level towards the runway and everything seemed normal. However, on final approach, witnesses on the ground stated "hearing the engines of the aircraft" but could not visually see the aircraft due to the thick fog and cloud cover. They predicted the aircraft flying lower than normal and slightly left of the centerline of the runway based on the location of the engine noise. Minutes after fully extending the flaps on final approach, the crew initiated a missed approach. The aircraft pitched up sharply at a rate of approximately 1200 feet per minute. Seconds later, the aircraft stalled and began a nosedive to the ground at a rate of 3000 feet per minute. During the descent, the co-pilot shouted "Descending" twice. Witnesses reported the engine noise to be steady prior to impact. A few seconds later, the aircraft struck trees of a forest on the west side of runway 15 just inside the airport perimeter. The aircraft then struck the ground a second time outside the airport perimeter, approximately 800 feet from the initial tree strike. A fire erupted following the ground impact and the aircraft burned down. The airplane was destroyed and all seven occupants were killed.

== Investigation ==
The Transportation Safety Board (TSB) of Canada was deployed to investigate the crash. The official accident report concluded that the probable cause of the accident was: The crew continued with the approach beyond the missed approach point without establishing the required visual references. The evidence indicates that, while subsequently carrying out a missed approach in IFR conditions, the aircraft was flown into the ground in a manner consistent with disorientation caused by a somatogravic illusion. Contributing to the occurrence were the inadequacy of the company's operating procedures and standards, and the inadequate definition of the visual references required for a circling approach.

== Television adaption ==
The crash was featured in The New Detectives (1996), Season 2, Episode 11 titled "Witness to Terror" including a full reconstruction and interviews.
