= Flightline Flight 101 =

2001 aviation accident in the Mediterranean Sea

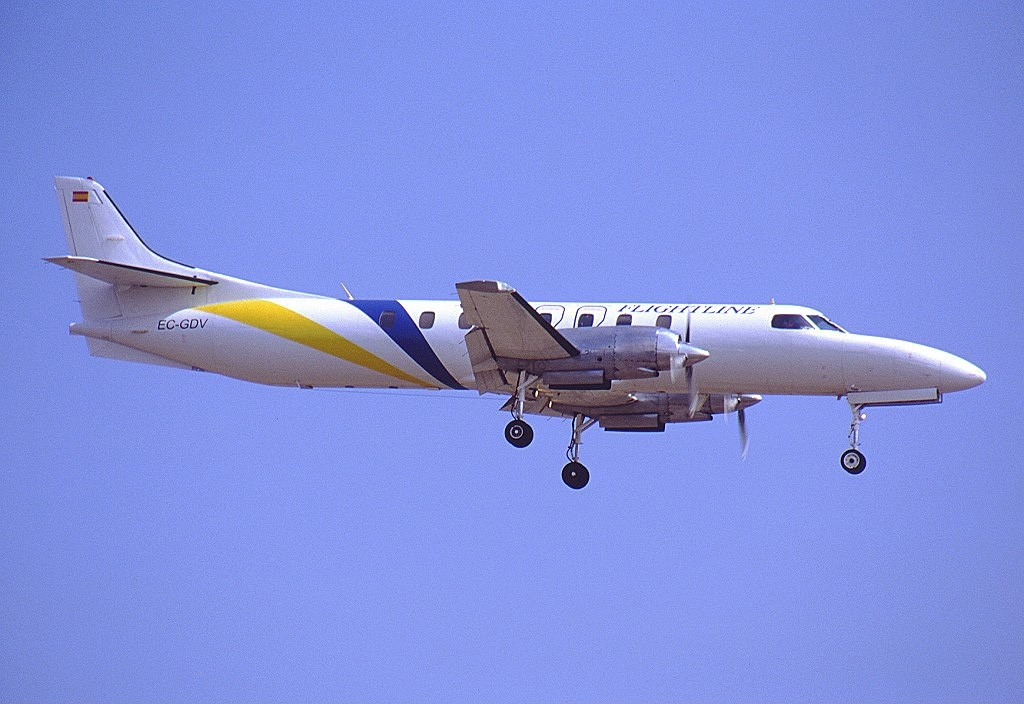
- EC-GDV, the aircraft involved in the accident, seen in August 2001

Accident
- Date: 10 October 2001
- Summary: Loss of control for undetermined reasons; possible lightning strike
- Site: Mediterranean Sea, 18.5 km from Columbretes Islands, Spain; 39°56′06″N 00°32′05″E

Aircraft
- Aircraft type: Swearingen SA226-AT Merlin IVA
- Operator: Flightline Barcelona
- ICAO flight No.: FTL101
- Registration: EC-GDV
- Flight origin: Barcelona-El Prat Airport, Spain
- Destination: Oran-es Senia Airport, Algeria
- Occupants: 10
- Passengers: 8
- Crew: 2
- Fatalities: 10
- Survivors: 0

Flightline Flight 101 was an international flight from Barcelona El-Prat Airport in Barcelona, Spain to Ahmed Ben Bella Airport in Oran, Algeria. It crashed into the sea, probably due to a lightning strike leading to a loss of electrical power or systems failure.

== Aircraft and crew ==
Nationality	Crew	Passengers	Total
Spain	2	0	2
Algeria/France	0	8	8
Total	2	8	10

EC-GDV was a Swearingen SA226-AT Merlin IVA Metroliner built in 1976. Prior to the accident it had accumulated 11,950 flight hours. It was powered by two TPE331-10UA engines. It was not equipped with a cockpit voice recorder nor a flight data recorder, and was not required to. All passengers on board were Algerian-French nationals returning to Algeria on holiday.

The captain and first officer, aged 33 and 43, respectively, were both Spanish nationals. Their total amount of flight experience is unknown.

== Flight ==
The aircraft took off from Barcelona-El Prat Airport at 10:18. It flew normally in the direction of Valencia before the last radio contact at 10:38 and disappeared from radar screens 4 minutes later, probably as a result of total electrical failure caused by a lightning strike. In their final contact with air traffic control, the pilot said that they were deviating from the flight route to avoid weather. Any loss of electrical power could have rendered many systems inoperable, such as elevator trim, lighting and instruments, anti-ice and navigation. The aircraft then impacted the water at a steep pitch angle, as a result of either loss of control or spatial disorientation. The wreckage was found around 60 kilometres (37 mi; 32 nmi) away from Castellón.

== Cause ==
Investigators noted two instances where an electrical failure occurred on board an SA-226/227 due to a lightning strike. On February 8, 1988, Nürnberger Flugdienst Flight 108 broke up in mid-air after the pilots became disoriented due to a loss of electrical power caused by a lightning strike. Later in November 1991, another aircraft suffered a lightning strike and a total electrical failure. However the crew managed to restore power and land safely.

Considering this and the loss of radar contact, investigators concluded that the cause of the accident could not be determined, but stated that a likely scenario was

a total loss of electric supply, caused by a lightning strike in the middle of the storm in which the aircraft was flying, without the crew being able to restore it. It is possible that the lightning strike produced other damage to the aircraft and/or led to or produced failures of its systems. This combination of circumstances, aggravated by the storm with heavy rainfall and turbulence and the associated lack of visibility, led to the aircraft's impact with the sea.

— Civil Aviation Accident and Incident Investigation Commission

== See also ==
- Nürnberger Flugdienst Flight 108
- Pan Am Flight 214
