= Riberalta Airport =

Airport in Bolivia

Cap. Av. Selin Zeitun Lopez Airport Riberalta Airport
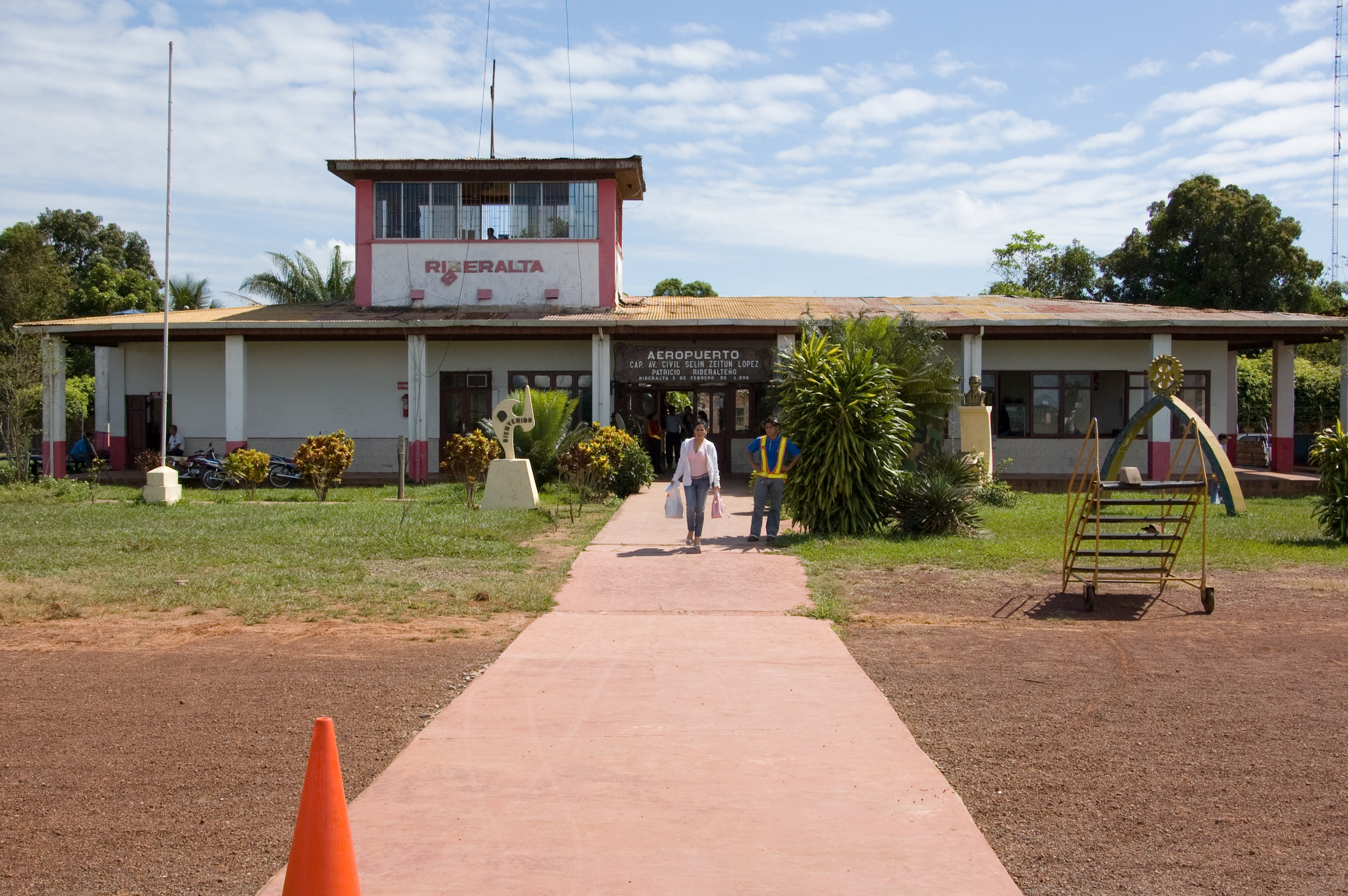
- IATA: RIB; ICAO: SLRI

Summary
- Airport type: Public
- Serves: Riberalta, Bolivia
- Elevation AMSL: 462 ft / 141 m
- Coordinates: 11°00′30″S 66°04′30″W

Map
- Location of airport in Bolivia

Runways
Direction	Length		Surface
Direction	m	ft	Surface
14/32	1,753	5,751	Asphalt
- Sources: GCM Google Maps

Capitán Av. Selin Zeitun Lopez Airport (IATA: RIB, ICAO: SLRI) is an airport serving Riberalta, a port city on the Beni River in the Beni Department of Bolivia. The airport is in the western section of the city, near the confluence of the Beni and Madre de Dios Rivers.

The Riberalta non-directional beacon (Ident: REA) is located on the field.

== Airlines and destinations ==
Airlines	Destinations
EcoJet	Santa Cruz de la Sierra–Viru Viru, Trinidad

== Accidents and incidents ==
- On November 3, 2013, Aerocon Flight 25, a Fairchild Swearingen Metroliner of the former airline Aerocon crashed at the airport due to bad weather and windshear, which caused the aircraft to overturn and catch fire. The accident resulted in 10 fatalities and 8 survivors.
- On March 29, 2018, a flight operated by the former airline Amaszonas, also using a Fairchild Swearingen Metroliner, suffered an accident after colliding with birds and crashing near a highway. However, all occupants survived, with only one person sustaining an ankle injury.

== See also ==
- Transport in Bolivia
- List of airports in Bolivia
