= Carson Air Flight 66 =

2015 aviation accident in Canada

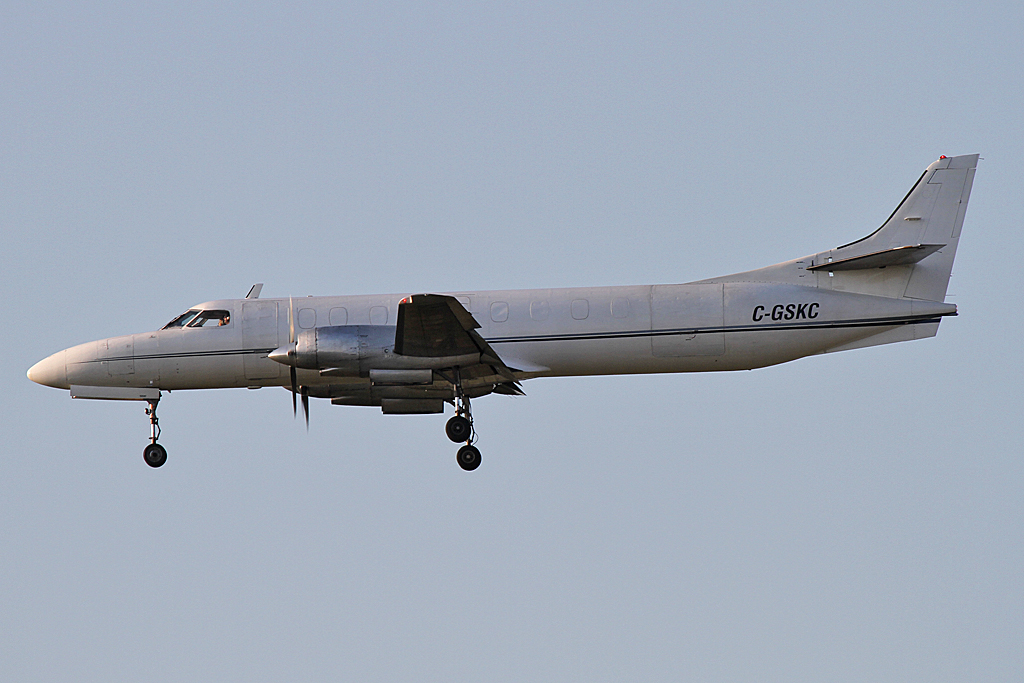
- C-GSKC, the Swearingen SA226-TC Metro II involved in the crash

Accident
- Date: 13 April 2015
- Summary: In-flight breakup
- Site: North Shore Mountains, British Columbia, Canada; 49.4090°N 123.0930°W

Aircraft
- Aircraft type: Swearingen SA226-TC Metro II
- Operator: Carson Air
- IATA flight No.: CA66
- Call sign: ECLIPSE 66
- Registration: C-GSKC
- Flight origin: Vancouver International Airport, Vancouver, Canada
- Destination: Prince George Airport, Prince George, British Columbia, Canada
- Occupants: 2
- Passengers: 0
- Crew: 2
- Fatalities: 2
- Survivors: 0

Carson Air Flight 66 was a Swearingen Metro II turboprop aircraft on a domestic cargo flight from Vancouver to Prince George, both in British Columbia, Canada. On 13 April 2015, the aircraft crashed into a mountain en route to Prince George Airport, killing both crew members.

== History of the flight ==
The flight had taken off from Vancouver International Airport at approximately 7:02 PDT. The aircraft subsequently descended from 2,400 meters to 900 meters in less than a minute. Air traffic controllers lost radar contact with the aircraft as it was en route to Prince George at roughly 7:08.

== Aircraft and crew ==
The aircraft, a twin-turboprop Swearingen SA226-TC Metro II, serial number TC-325, registered C-GSKC, was manufactured in 1977. Carson Air was its only operator. The aircraft was not equipped with a cockpit voice recorder or a flight data recorder.

The crew consisted of only the cockpit crew, 34-year-old pilot Robert Brandt and 32-year-old co-pilot Kevin Wang.

== Search ==
The aircraft crashed into a hillside area near Crown Mountain, a part of the North Shore Mountains. Two helicopters and two aircraft from North Shore Rescue participated in the search for the wreckage of the aircraft, which was slowed by poor weather conditions. It was later discovered that the emergency locating transmitter was activated, but did not send out a signal.

== Investigation ==
The accident was investigated by the Transportation Safety Board of Canada (TSB), which determined the cause of the accident to be an in-flight breakup caused by a rapid descent. However, no definite reason was found as to why the descent was initiated. An autopsy performed on the two pilots by the British Columbia Coroner Service revealed that pilot Brandt had a blood alcohol level of 0.24 percent, three times the legal limit for a driver.
