= Castle Aviation =

Cargo airline in Ohio, US

IATA	ICAO	Call sign
CSJA	CSJ	CASTLE
- Founded: 1984 (as Air Medical Transport Inc.) - 1986 as Castle Aviation
- AOC #: CSJA990C
- Hubs: Akron-Canton, OH (KCAK)
- Focus cities: Hamilton, Ontario (CYHM); Cincinnati, OH (KCVG); West Chicago, Illinois (KDPA); Indianapolis, Indiana (KIND)
- Fleet size: 15
- Headquarters: North Canton, Ohio, United States
- Key people: Michael Grossmann - Founder, Owner, CEO; David Combs - President; David Scheufler - Vice President and Director Of Maintenance; Dennis Telles III - Director of Operations; Michael Looby - Chief Pilot
- Employees: ~ 70
- Website: http://www.castleair.com/

Castle Aviation is a cargo airline and private passenger airline based in North Canton, Ohio, United States. It offers charter cargo and private passenger services, but primarily provides priority freight service for the Canadian parcel post service Purolator. Its only base is the Akron–Canton Airport.

== History ==
The airline was established and started operations in January 1986. In April 2004 it started operating the first freight version of the Saab 340A aircraft.

The company broke ground on a new 80,000 sq ft (7,400 m^{2}) hangar in September 2023.

== Fleet ==
The Castle Aviation fleet consists of the following aircraft (as of October 2023):

Aircraft	In service	Orders	Notes
208B Super Cargomaster	7	0	Freighter configuration
Piper Aerostar	4	0	Passenger configuration
Saab 340B	4 (as of August 2025)	0	Freighter configuration
Hawker 400	1	0	Passenger configuration

=== Previously operated ===
Aircraft	In fleet
Saab 340A	1
Piper Cheyenne II	1
Swearingen Merlin	2
Piper Meridian	1

== Accidents / Incidents ==
- On December 10, 2021, Castle Air Flight 921 (N54GP), a Castle Aviation owned and operated Swearingen Merlin flying from Essex County Airport in New Jersey to Manchester–Boston Regional Airport, crashed into a wooded area in Bedford, New Hampshire on the banks of the Merrimack River while on short final to runway 6. The pilot, who was the sole occupant, was killed upon impact.
- On February 10, 2016, a Castle Aviation owned and operated Cessna C208B Super Cargomaster slid off of a runway at Cleveland Hopkins International Airport in winter weather conditions. This runway excursion resulted in the closing of a runway and several flights being diverted.
- On December 5, 2007, a Castle Aviation owned and operated Cessna C208B Super Cargomaster (N28MG) was flying from Rickenbacker International Airport to Buffalo Niagara International Airport when it crashed less than one minute after takeoff. The NTSB report indicated the probable cause of the crash was the pilot's failure to maintain aircraft control and collision avoidance with terrain due to spatial disorientation, with low cloud ceiling and night conditions contributing to the accident. The pilot and a passenger died in the crash. Also noteworthy is another Castle Aviation Super Cargo Master (N27MG) was at the departure airport stuck in the snow where it had departed the pavement while taxiing for takeoff ahead of N28MG. N28MG taxied past the stuck N27MG and departed after deicing.
- On October 8, 1998, a Caslte Aviation owned and operated Piper Chieftain (N3453A) was flying from Detroit Metropolitan Airport to Portage County Airport when it was destroyed after a forced landing in a wooded area near Ravenna, Ohio, approximately 5 miles from the destination airport due to fuel starvation. The airplane had been suffering issues with the landing gear status lights during the trip which caused a circuit breaker to open. The pilot flew four more legs with the airplane in this condition, not realizing the fuel gauges were also disabled by that circuit breaker.
