= Teniente Jorge Henrich Arauz Airport =

Airport in Trinidad, Bolivia

- IATA: TDD; ICAO: SLTR

Summary
- Airport type: Public/General
- Serves: Trinidad
- Location: Trinidad, Bolivia
- Elevation AMSL: 509 ft (155 m)
- Coordinates: 14°49′15″S 64°55′00″W

Map
- Location of airport in Bolivia

Runways
Direction	Length		Surface
Direction	m	ft	Surface
14/32	2,400	7,874	Paved

Statistics (2023)
- Passengers: 371,138
- Sources: GCM

Teniente Jorge Henrich Arauz Airport (IATA: TDD, ICAO: SLTR) is an airport serving the city of Trinidad, Bolivia. It is the main airport and gateway to the Bolivian section of the Amazon basin.

== Airlines and destinations ==
Airlines	Destinations
Boliviana de Aviacion	Cochabamba, La Paz, Santa Cruz de la Sierra–Viru Viru
EcoJet	Cobija, Cochabamba, Guayaramerín, La Paz, Riberalta, Santa Cruz de la Sierra–Viru Viru

== Accidents and incidents ==
- On 19 April 1968, Douglas VC-47D CP-734 of Lloyd Aéreo Boliviano crashed on take-off.
- On 1 February 2008, Boeing 727 CP-2429 of Lloyd Aéreo Boliviano landed 4.2 km short of the runway due to fuel exhaustion.
- On 6 September 2011, Aerocon Flight 238, operated by Swearingen SA.227BC Metroliner III CP-2548 crashed on approach, killing eight of the nine people on board.

== See also ==
- Transport in Bolivia
- List of airports in Bolivia
