= El Trompillo Airport =

Airport serving Santa Cruz de la Sierra, Bolivia

El Trompillo Airport Aeropuerto El Trompillo
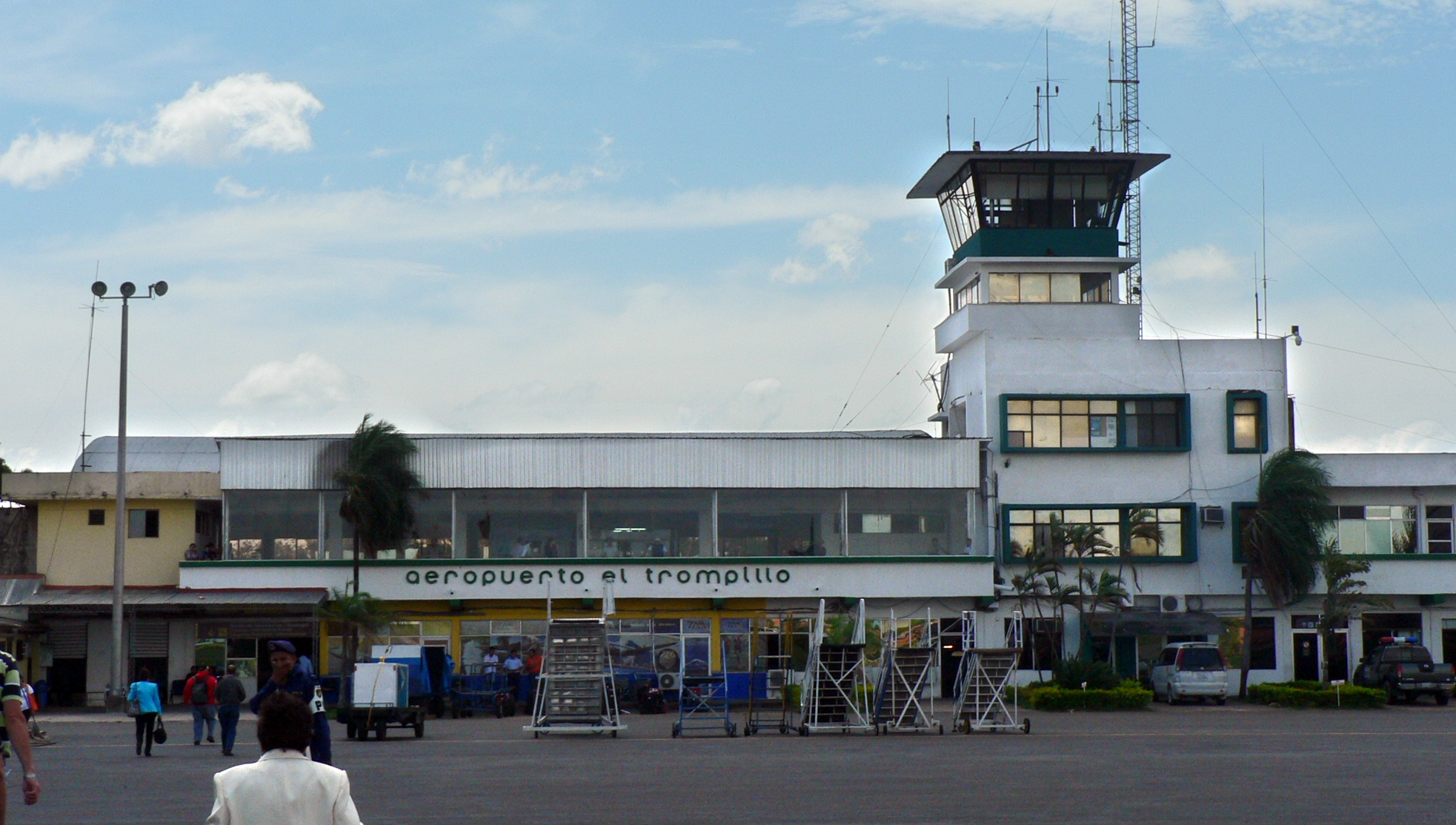
- IATA: SRZ; ICAO: SLET

Summary
- Airport type: Public / Military
- Serves: Santa Cruz, Bolivia
- Opened: 1920
- Passenger services ceased: 23 September 2019
- Elevation AMSL: 1,371 ft / 418 m
- Coordinates: 17°48′41″S 063°10′17″W

Map
- Location of airport in Bolivia

Runways
Direction	Length		Surface
Direction	m	ft	Surface
15/33	2,787	9,144	Asphalt
- Source: DAFIF

El Trompillo Airport (IATA: SRZ, ICAO: SLET) is located in the south part of Santa Cruz, Bolivia, about 2 km (1.25 miles) away from the central plaza.

== History ==
El Trompillo Airport was created in 1920 with a runway that measured no more than 800 meters (2,624 feet). The airport was given the name of “Captain Horacio Vasquez”, honoring a pilot who died in an accident flying from Argentina to La Paz. Nevertheless, because of the location, the airport with time was known as “El Trompillo”. For the first 65 years, it was the only airport in the city until, in 1984, the international airport of Viru Viru was constructed. Since then it has only operated local flights and the landing and departure of students of the Bolivian Air Force.

The first airlines to use this airport were Lloyd Aéreo Boliviano, known as LAB, and Panagra. About 70 departures and arrivals of the Air Force, and small and large airlines are registered. For a while, from 1980 to 1985, the amount of airplanes registered increased due to a combat against drug traffic.

As of 2019, there are currently no commercial passenger flights since the national carrier Transporte Aéreo Militar ceased operations.

== Facilities ==
Aerocon had its head office in Hangar 93.

== Incidents ==
- On July 29, 1961, a Lockheed Constellation, registered N2520B to Lloyd Airlines from Miami, Florida (not to be confused with Lloyd Aereo Boliviano) was intercepted by the Bolivian Air Force after taking off from El Trompillo. The Lockheed Constellation tried to get away but was forced to return to El Trompillo after a chase, which resulted in the death of BAF pilot Alberto Peredo Cespedes, whose Mustang PF-51 plane crashed at Cicumvalacion avenue during the pursuit. The five people in the Constellation were arrested, accused of contraband and homicide, later released on bond and escaped. The Constellation remained in Bolivia, and was later used by Aerosur and Pepsi for advertising purposes. The incident became known as the "Pirate Airplane Incident". (in Spanish)
- On 13 October, 1976, A Boeing 707 cargo freighter of Lloyd Aereo Boliviano registered N730JP crashed shortly after takeoff from El Trompillo and hit a school, killing all three crew on board and 88 people on the ground. The cause of the accident is disputed, between pilot fatigue and improper flight preparation or an engine failure and subsequent fire.

== See also ==
- Transport in Bolivia
- List of airports in Bolivia
