= Riberalta =

City and municipality in Beni Department, Bolivia

- Town and municipality
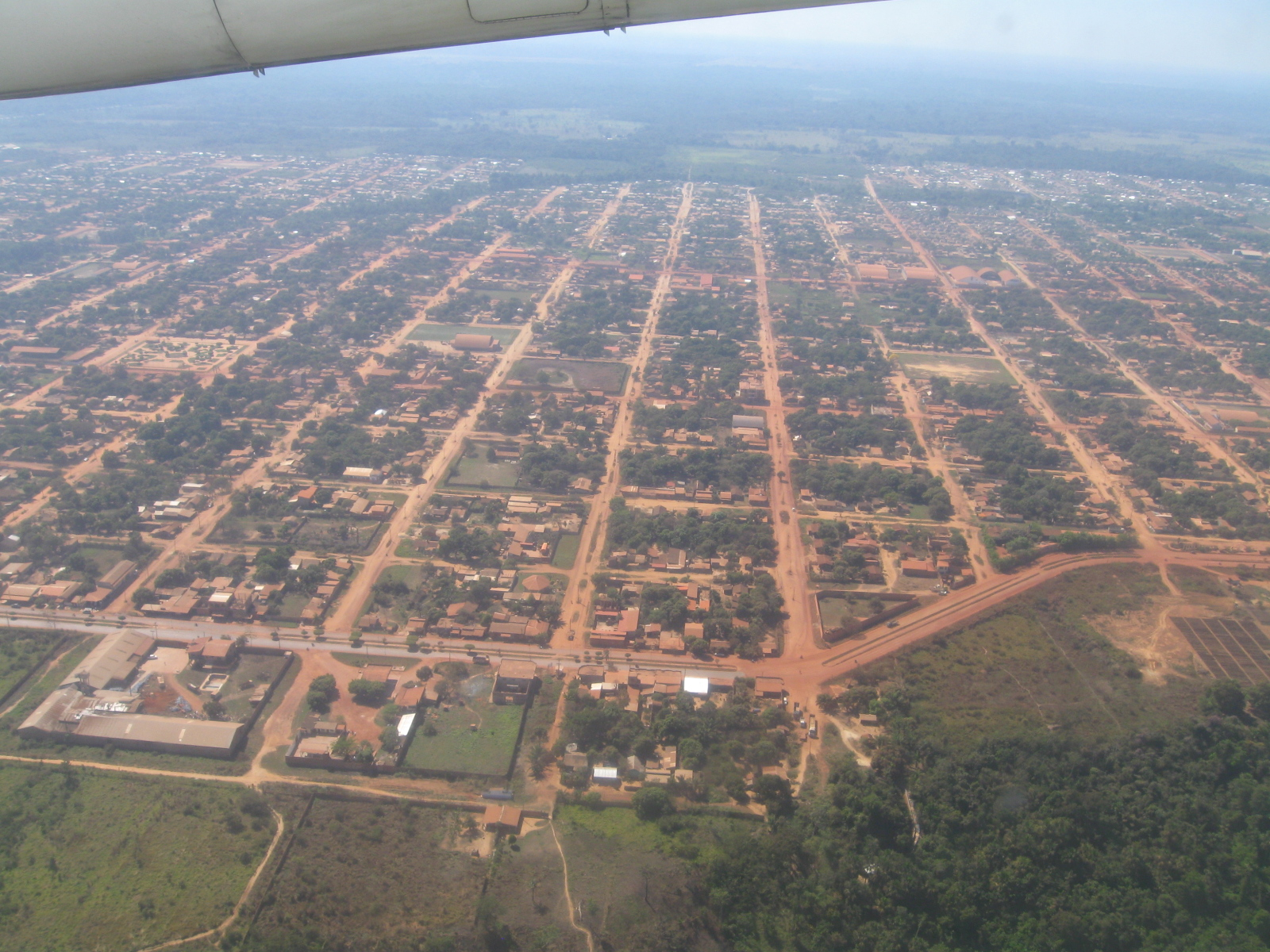
- Riberalta, Bolivia

- Location of Riberalta town in Bolivia
- Coordinates: 10°59′S 66°6′W
- Country: Bolivia
- Department: Beni Department
- Province: Vaca Díez Province
- Settled: 1897

Area
  - Total: 20.1 km^{2} (7.8 sq mi)
- Elevation: 144 m (472 ft)

Population (2018)
  - Total: 99,070
  - Density: 4,930/km^{2} (12,800/sq mi)
- Time zone: UTC-4 (BOT)
- Area code: +591 2
- Website: Official website

Riberalta is a city in the Beni Department in northern Bolivia, situated where the Madre de Dios River joins the Beni River. Riberalta is on the south (southeast) bank of the Beni River.

As the capital of the province of Vaca Diez, the city has maintained its charm even after the Brazilian nut trade sparked recent development. Bolivia is the dominant producer of the nuts, in the period 2017/2018, the country accounted for 78% of production. Peru produces 16% while Brazil produces a mere 2%. City life in Riberalta Municipality is punctuated by nature thanks to its location on the banks of the Beni and Madre de Dios rivers and its proximity to the Amazon rainforest. Home to the Bolivian Navy flotilla and the 1st Naval District, the city is also called the Bolivian capital of the Amazon.

== History ==
Riberalta was originally inhabited by the Chácobo and Pacahuara natives who called it “Pamahuayá”, which means “place of the fruits”. Bolivian anthropologist Wigberto Rivero determined that the area was once populated by indigenous groups of the Pano family; which belong to the native Pacahuara, Chacobos, Caripunas, Sinabos and Perintintin. These same people lived for thousands of years resisting attacks from the Incan Empire and western settlers.

Riberalta’s current name comes from the union of two words in Spanish: “ribera alta” (“high bank” in English.) The city was founded on February 3, 1894 with approximately 2,500 inhabitants established in a red canyon in Northern Bolivia.

It is also known as the city of four names: Barranca Colorada (Red Canyon), La Cruz (The Cross), Ribera-Alta (High Bank), and Riberalta. Starting in the middle of the 19th century, solo explorers and navigators of the Bolivian Northwest penetrated the solitary jungle; They founded barracks more than thirty meters high, erected and blessed by the convergence of two colossal rivers, which turned the municipality into the economic center of the north of the country.

On October 8, 1880, Don Edwin Heath named the city Barranca Colorada. A few years later Frederico Bodo Claussen, manager of House Braillard de Reyes, was informed of the barracks and sent a German subject with resources to install a commercial factory there. Afterwards, it received the name La Cruz on May 3, 1884 when Don Maximo Henicke surveyed a small home built two years earlier in 1882 by Placido Mendez. A little over a year later, on July 7 of 1885, Bodo Claussen baptized the city under the name Ribera-Alta, which later was combined into Riberalta. Nine years later, on February 3 of 1894, Riberalta was founded with an official act under the name Villa Riberalta, after having already existed for twelve years. It was founded by a National Delegate of the Colonies, Lysimachus Gutiérrez, who did so under the orders of President Mariano Baptista and in honor of the birth of the Mcal. Antonio Jose de Sucre.

== Climate ==
Riberalta belongs to a transition zone between the tropical savanna climate of the Llanos de Moxos and the tropical monsoon climate of the southwestern amazon rainforest. Precipitation is moderately high, but divided starkly between seasons. According to the Köppen Climate Classification system, Riberalta has a tropical savanna climate, abbreviated "Aw" on climate maps, with a pronounced wet and dry season.

Climate data for Riberalta, elevation 141 m (463 ft)
Month	Jan	Feb	Mar	Apr	May	Jun	Jul	Aug	Sep	Oct	Nov	Dec	Year
Record high °C (°F)	35.0 (95.0)	35.0 (95.0)	36.0 (96.8)	34.6 (94.3)	35.8 (96.4)	33.3 (91.9)	34.2 (93.6)	36.4 (97.5)	38.3 (100.9)	36.5 (97.7)	36.0 (96.8)	36.8 (98.2)	38.3 (100.9)
Mean daily maximum °C (°F)	31.5 (88.7)	31.4 (88.5)	31.7 (89.1)	31.7 (89.1)	31.2 (88.2)	31.0 (87.8)	31.7 (89.1)	33.1 (91.6)	33.6 (92.5)	33.4 (92.1)	32.4 (90.3)	31.7 (89.1)	32.0 (89.7)
Daily mean °C (°F)	26.8 (80.2)	26.7 (80.1)	26.8 (80.2)	26.6 (79.9)	25.7 (78.3)	24.8 (76.6)	24.6 (76.3)	25.8 (78.4)	26.9 (80.4)	27.4 (81.3)	27.1 (80.8)	26.9 (80.4)	26.3 (79.4)
Mean daily minimum °C (°F)	22.1 (71.8)	22.0 (71.6)	21.9 (71.4)	21.5 (70.7)	20.2 (68.4)	18.6 (65.5)	17.4 (63.3)	18.5 (65.3)	20.2 (68.4)	21.5 (70.7)	21.8 (71.2)	22.0 (71.6)	20.6 (69.2)
Record low °C (°F)	20.6 (69.1)	20.0 (68.0)	17.2 (63.0)	15.0 (59.0)	10.0 (50.0)	9.9 (49.8)	8.9 (48.0)	10.0 (50.0)	13.8 (56.8)	16.1 (61.0)	16.0 (60.8)	19.0 (66.2)	8.9 (48.0)
Average precipitation mm (inches)	279.2 (10.99)	265.7 (10.46)	256.2 (10.09)	157.3 (6.19)	74.7 (2.94)	27.3 (1.07)	17.2 (0.68)	21.8 (0.86)	64.5 (2.54)	144.8 (5.70)	201.4 (7.93)	262.4 (10.33)	1,772.5 (69.78)
Average precipitation days	17.6	16.4	15.9	11.4	6.6	3.0	1.4	2.0	4.7	9.4	12.8	16.2	117.4
Average relative humidity (%)	80.9	81.7	80.9	80.6	78.7	76.1	69.5	66.2	67.7	72.4	77.0	79.6	75.9
Source 1: Servicio Nacional de Meteorología e Hidrología de Bolivia
Source 2: Deutscher Wetterdienst (extremes)

== Transportation ==
Riberalta is connected to Rurrenabaque, Cobija, Trinidad and Santa Cruz de la Sierra by bus and to the rest of Bolivia through the Capitán Av. Selin Zeitun Lopez Airport (RIB), Northern Bolivia.

== Gallery ==
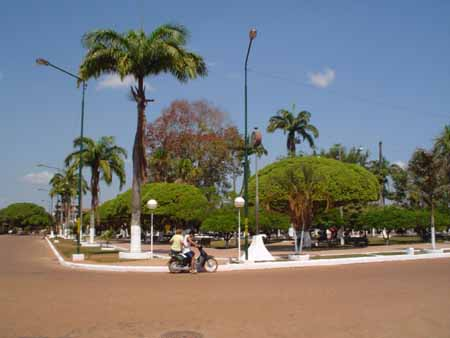
Main square of the city, Riberalta, Bolivia

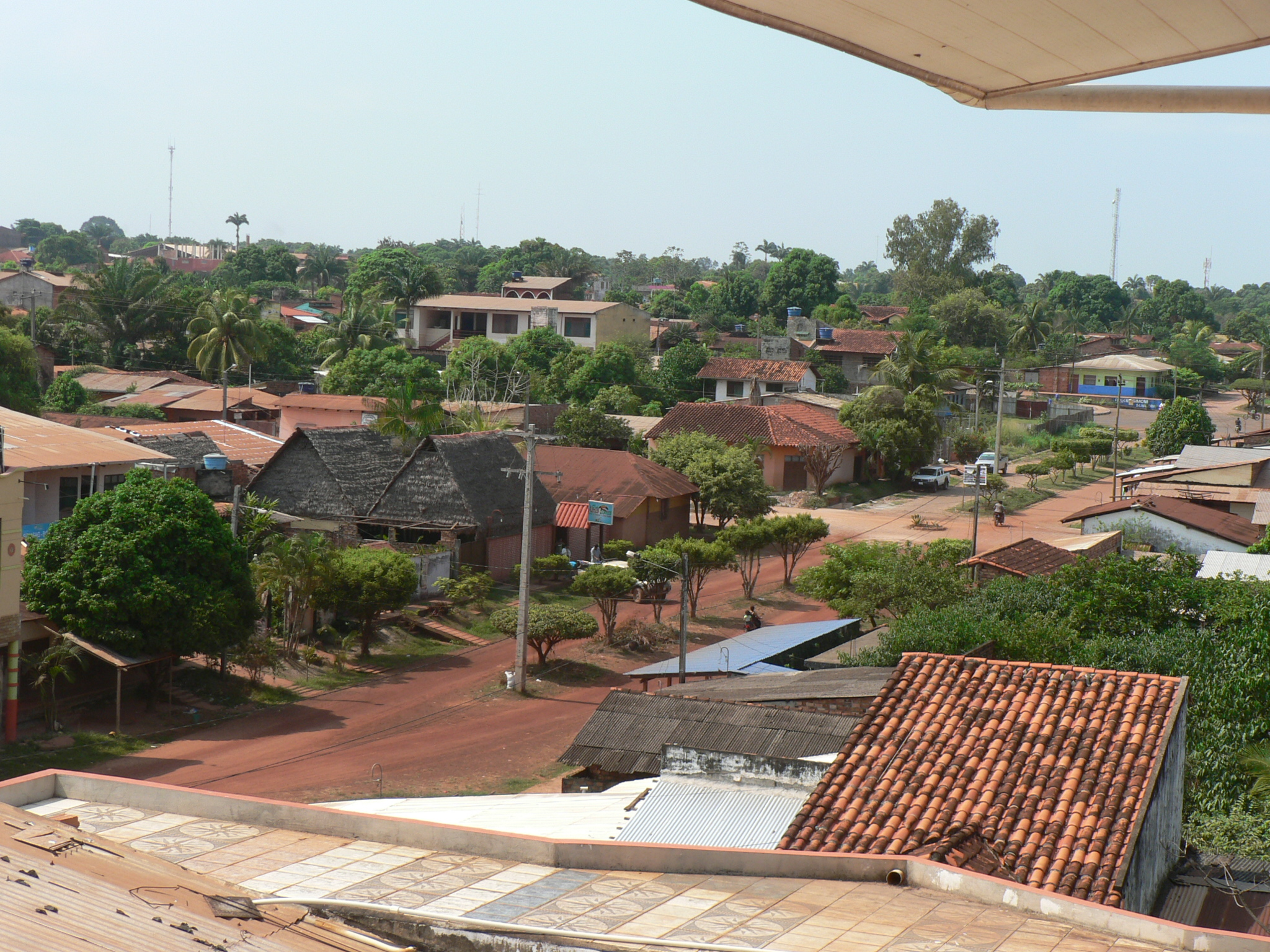
A view of the city

== See also ==
- Riberalta Airport
- Amazon rubber boom
- Brazil nut
