= List of airlines of Bolivia =

This is a list of airlines of Bolivia which have an Air Operator Certificate issued by the Civil Aviation Authority.

== Active ==
Airline	Image	IATA	ICAO	Callsign	Hub(s)	Founded	Notes
AeroEste			ROE		El Trompillo Airport	1994	
Boliviana de Aviación		OB	BOV	BOLIVIANA	Jorge Wilstermann International Airport	2007	Flag carrier.
EcoJet		8J	ECO	ECOJET	Jorge Wilstermann International Airport	2013	
TAMep			EPT	TAMEP	Viru Viru International Airport	1945	Successor to TAM Bolivia.
Transportes Aéreos Bolivianos		2L	BOL	BOL	Viru Viru International Airport	1977	Cargo.

== Defunct ==
Airline	Image	IATA	ICAO	Callsign	Founded	Ceased operations	Notes
Aerobecasa					1974	1977	
AeroBol Transporte Aéreo					1985	1995	
Aerocon		A4	AEK	AEROCON	2005	2015	
Aerolíneas Abaroa					1960	1968	Acquired by Compañia Boliviana de Aviación.
Aerolineas Sudamericanas		AS	ASK	SUDAMERICANA	2007	2008	
AeroSur		5L	RSU	AEROSUR	1992	2012	Bankrupt.
Aerovias Condor					1958	1963	
Aerovias Las Minas			ALM		1964	1991	
Alas del Sur		D4	ASC		2006	2007	Operated Fokker F27.
BAFIN					1975	1990	Renamed to BAS Transportes Aéreos.
BAS Transportes Aéreos					1990	1991	
Bolivian Airways International					1966	1977	
Comercializadora Aérea Mixta Boliviana					1960	1999	Meat carrier.
Compañia Boliviana de Aviación					1968	1997	
Empresa Industria Ganadera					1970	1970	Meat carrier.
Fri Reyes					1960	1994	Meat carrier.
Frigorifico Cooperativo Los Andes					1950	1964	Meat carrier.
Frigorifico Movima					1967	1981	Meat carrier.
Frigorifico Santa Rita					1970	2001	Meat carrier.
LAI - Línea Aérea Imperial					1979	1995	Operated Fairchild Swearingen Metroliner.
Lambda Air Cargo					1980	1996	
LaMia			LMI	LAMIA	2014	2016	
La Cumbre					1974	1995	Meat carrier.
Línea Aérea Amaszonas		Z8	AZN	AMASZONAS	1998	2023	
Lloyd Aéreo Boliviano		LB	LLB	LLOYDAEREO	1925	2010	
NACIF Transportes Aéreos					1996	2001	
Northeast Bolivian Airways			NBA	NEBA	1970	2006	
SAVCO					1971	2001	Meat carrier.
Servicios Aereos Santa Ana					1982	1996	Renamed to NACIF Transportes Aéreos.
Servicios Aéreos Santiago					1994	1999	Meat carrier.
Servicios Aéreos Vargas España					1974	2005	
Trans Aéreos Illimani			TAI	TRANSAEREOS	1972	1979	Operated Curtiss C-46 Commando.
Trans Aéreos Illimani			TAI	TRANSAEREOS	1980	1984	Operated Curtiss C-46 Commando.

== See also ==
- List of airlines of the Americas
- List of defunct airlines of the Americas
