= SAVCO =

Bolivian airline

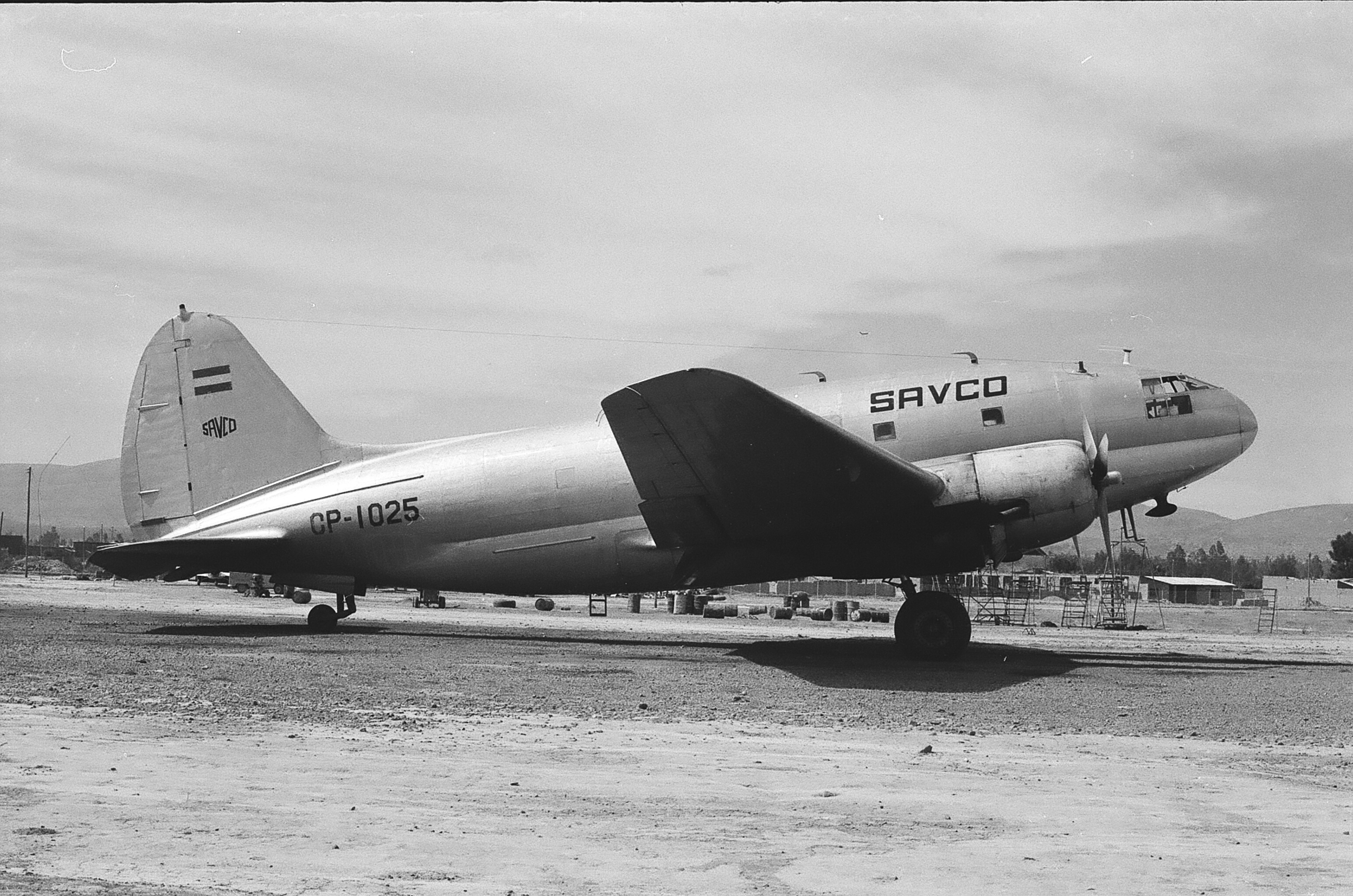
IATA	ICAO	Call sign
-	-	SAVCO
- Founded: 1970
- Commenced operations: 1971
- Ceased operations: 2001
- Fleet size: 6
- Headquarters: Cochabamba, Bolivia

SAVCO, an acronym for Servicios Aéreos Virgen de Copacabana was a Bolivian airline based in Cochabamba.

== History ==
Servicios Aéreos Virgen de Copacabana, was founded in the year of 1970. Flight operations began the following year (1971) with two used Douglas DC-6s from American Airlines, initially from Santa Cruz-El Trompillo Airport. Soon, the company headquarters was moved to Cochabamba Airport.

The aircraft, converted into freighters, were mainly used to transport meat from the agriculturally dominated lowlands to high-altitude cities such as La Paz and Cochabamba. Within the first few years of operations several aircraft would be destroyed in accidents, the first of which would happen in 1971 and then 1972. The airline would initially begin transporting beef across Bolivia from many regional towns.

Over the years, the airline would operate a fleet size of four Douglas DC-3s. The first DC-3 was retired in 1979, and the second in the 1980s. One was destroyed on the ground in December 1990, while the last one remained in service until operations ceased.

The backbone of the fleet consisted of a total of six Curtiss C-46 Commando. The first one was added to the fleet in November 1971. All of the Commandos would end up being written off 4 of which at SAVCO, one at TAVIC (Transporte Aereos Virgen de Carmen), and one at Avesca Colombia.

In the year of 2001 the airline would cease operations.

== Fleet ==
Historic Fleet of Virgen de Copacabana Air Services
Aircraft	Total	Introduced	Retired	Registrations
Comando Curtiss C-46	6	1971	1983	CP-1280, CP-1025, CP-1063, CP-959, CP-1052 y CP-1063
Douglas DC-3	3	1970	1990	CP-1128, CP-733 y CP-1668
Douglas DC-6	4	1970	??	CP-1280, N90730, CP-926, CP-927

== See also ==
- List of defunct airlines of Bolivia
- Frigorifico Santa Rita
