= Comercializadora Aérea Mixta Boliviana =

Bolivian airline, 1960–1999

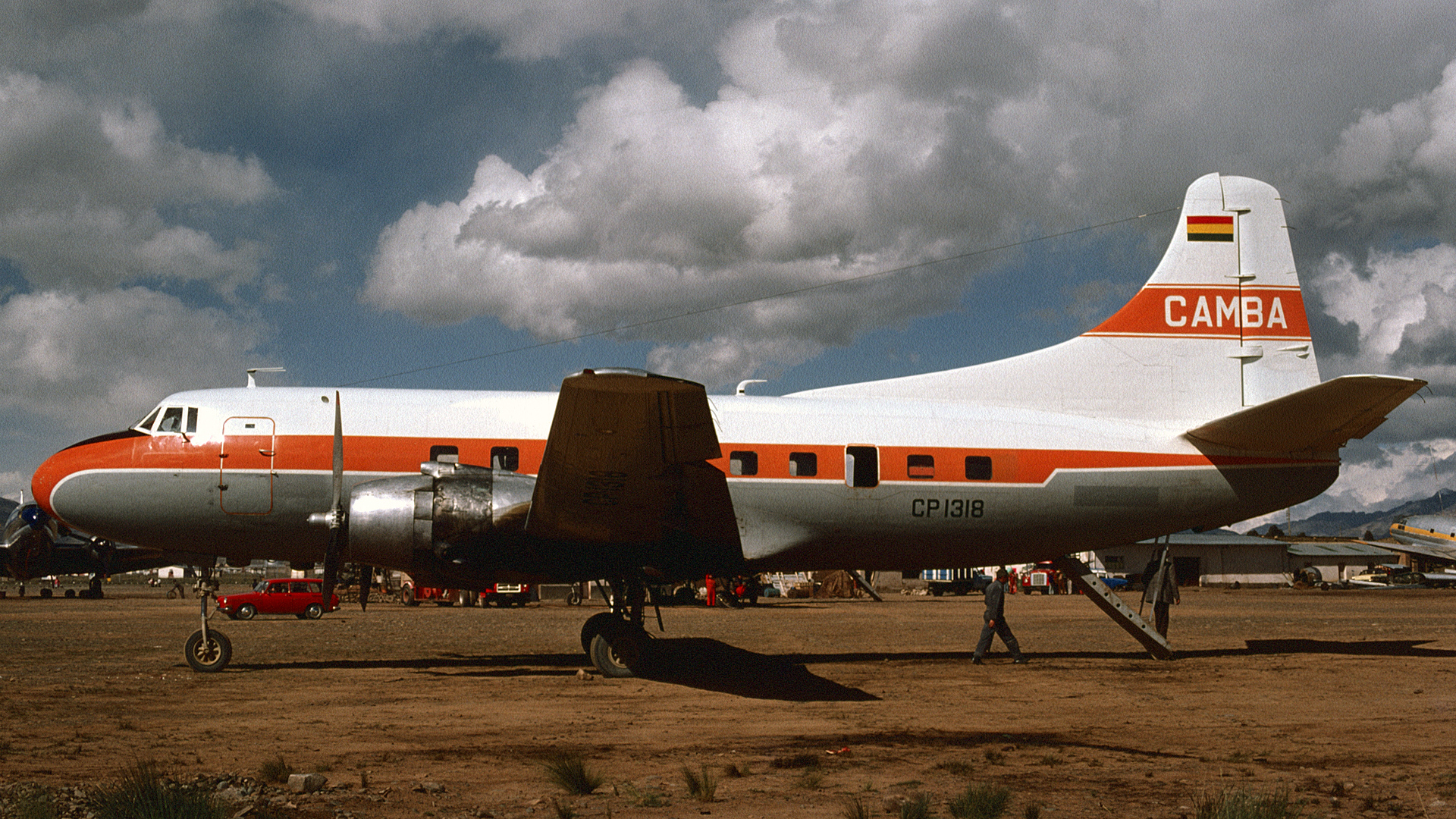
- Founded: 1960
- Ceased operations: 1999
- Operating bases: El Alto International Airport
- Headquarters: La Paz, Bolivia

Comercializadora Aérea Mixta Boliviana or CAMBA was a Bolivian meat carrier that operated from 1960 to 1999.

== History ==
CAMBA was founded in 1960 to strengthen freight transport in Bolivia, in the agricultural sector. In the 1970s and 1980s it was one of the leading cargo airlines in Bolivia.

In the 1990s the airline would face operational challenges such as the modernization of roads in Bolivia and a Convair CV 440 crash in 1993 which would hurt the airline.

In 1999 the airline ceased operations due to the modernization of roads in Bolivia, increased operations cost and decrasing demand as during the time the meat carriers in Bolivia were dying off during the 1990s and early 2000s.

== Fleet ==
This was the full fleet of CAMBA
Aircraft	number of	service life	Registrations	Notes
Convair CV-440	1	1990-1993	CP-2212	
Curtiss C-46	2	1960-1999	CP-1319 and CP-687	
Martin 2-0-2	1	1971-????	CP-1441	
Martin 4-0-4	4	1977-1981	CP-1440, CP-1318, CP-1317 and CP-1570	

== Accidents and incidents ==
On September 12, 1961 a Curtiss C-46 crashed into a mountain killing 1 person.

== See also ==
List of defunct airlines of Bolivia
