= 1949 Strato-Freight Curtiss C-46A crash =

Airplane crash in 1949 in Puerto Rico

Coordinates: 18.469°N 66.204°W

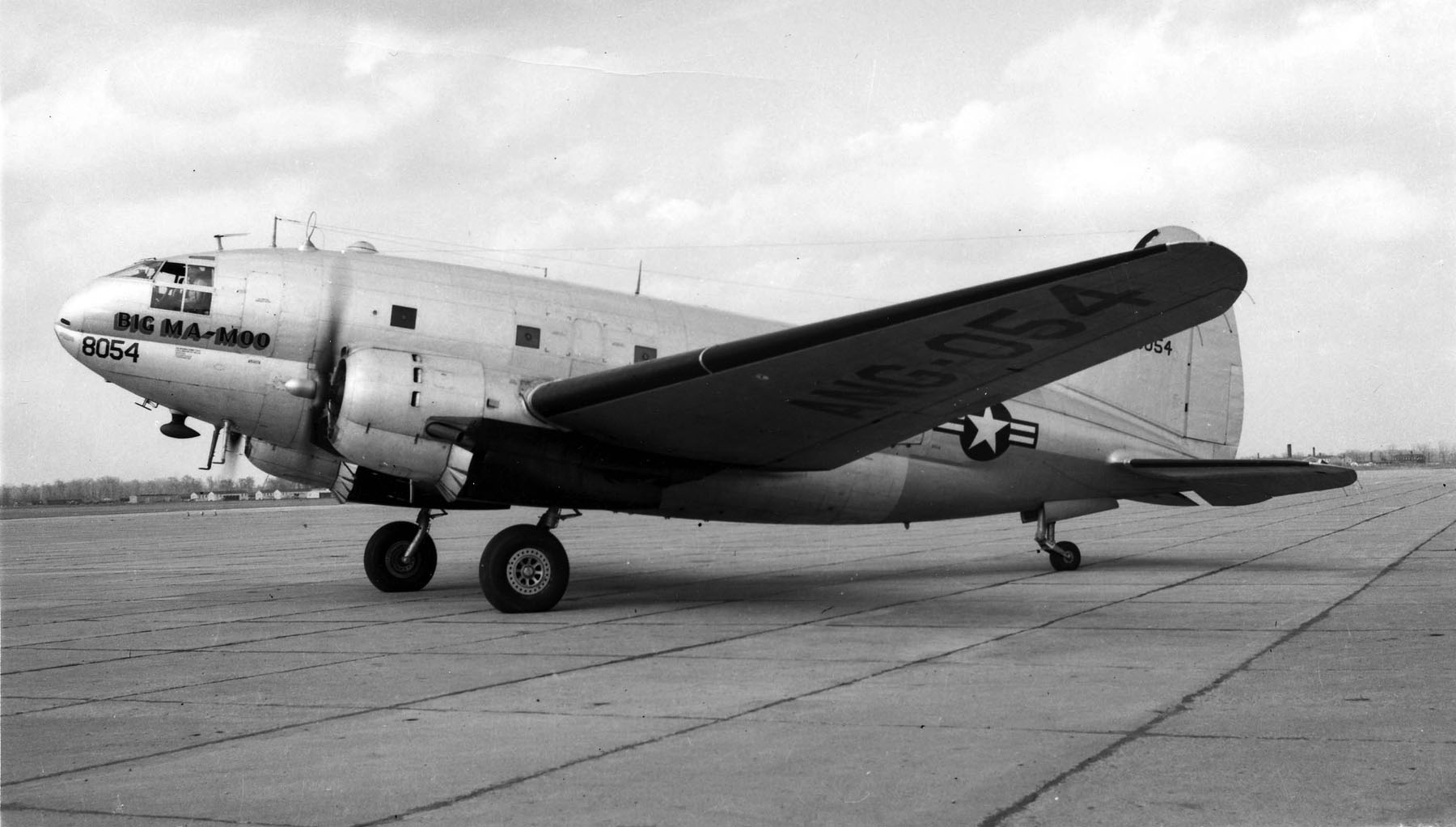
- A Curtiss C-46D similar to the crash aircraft

Accident
- Date: June 7, 1949
- Summary: Maintenance error using sparkplugs not approved for the engine type
- Site: 10 km (6.3 mi) West of San Juan-Isla Grande Airport, Atlantic Ocean

Aircraft
- Aircraft type: Curtiss Wright C-46D
- Operator: Strato-Freight, Inc.
- Registration: NC92857
- Flight origin: San Juan, Puerto Rico
- Destination: Miami, Florida, US
- Passengers: 75
- Crew: 6
- Fatalities: 53
- Survivors: 28

On June 7, 1949, a Strato-Freight Curtiss Wright C-46D, registered in the United States as NC92857, crashed into the Atlantic Ocean 10 km (6.4 mi) west of San Juan-Isla Grande Airport in San Juan, Puerto Rico while en route to Miami, Florida. Of the 81 passengers and crew on board, 53 were killed.

== Crash ==
On June 4, 1949 (three days prior to the accident), the Strato Freight C-46 arrived in San Juan from Newark, New Jersey. Regular maintenance included a new flap follow-up cable, along with a check of both engines. Due to misfiring of the right engine, 13 new spark plugs were also installed.

On June 7, the aircraft was in service for a flight to Miami. The plane taxied to the runway at 00:10, and was airborne at 00:21. Approximately one minute thereafter, the right engine began losing power. The aircrew declared an emergency; the plane subsequently crashed into the Atlantic Ocean, roughly 200 m (656 ft) off the coastline. The aircraft remained afloat for six minutes, during which time 28 of the 81 passengers and crew were able to evacuate. According to various sources, 53 or 54 passengers perished. This was, at the time, the largest death toll ever due to a plane crash.

== Investigation ==
=== Spark plugs ===
Since the right engine had backfired during the maintenance check in San Juan, 13 new spark plugs (AC-LS-87) had been installed. The AC-LS-87 spark plug accounted for 30 of the 36 required for the engine to run. This type of spark plug was not approved for use in the Curtiss C-46A by the engine manufacturer or the United States Air Forces (which specifically prohibited the use of this type of spark plug in the C-46A's Pratt and Whitney engines). Furthermore, the rear right engine spark plugs suffered extreme heat damage. This was linked to the right engine ignition switch found in the left magneto position, only allowing the rear spark plugs to fire. Finally, the Civil Aeronautics Board (CAB) determined "the spark plug terminals for this engine were found to be oily and dirty, and spark plug electrodes were found to have too much clearance."

=== Overweight ===
Strato-Freight computed the total gross weight of NC92857 to be 44,500 lbs (20,185 kg), just under the maximum allowed 45,000 lbs (20,412 kg). The Civil Aeronautics Board calculated the total weight at 48,709 lbs (22,094 kg), 3,709 lbs (1,682 kg) over the maximum certified weight allowed. The passengers on board were reportedly nervous prior to the crash due to the extra weight.

=== Passenger safety ===
Strato-Freight NC92857, with a manifest of 75 passengers, was configured with 65 passenger seats. Five passengers were infants carried in the arms of passengers, and 14 were between the age of 2 and 12. At least five passengers other than infants were sharing a seat with another passenger.

=== Probable cause ===
The investigation concluded "the loss of power of the right engine before the aircraft attained the optimum single engine climb speed, together with the overloaded condition of the aircraft, resulted in it losing altitude and settling into the sea."

=== Corrective actions ===
Strato-Freight's operating license was initially suspended, and was finally revoked effective 8 November 1949. The CAA concluded that the company "(did) not exercise the care required of the holder of an air carrier operating certificate, and by the pattern of its violations manifests an attitude of indifference for the safety of others and a disregard of the civil air regulations."
