= Frigorifico Santa Rita =

Bolivian airline

Frigorifico Santa Ria
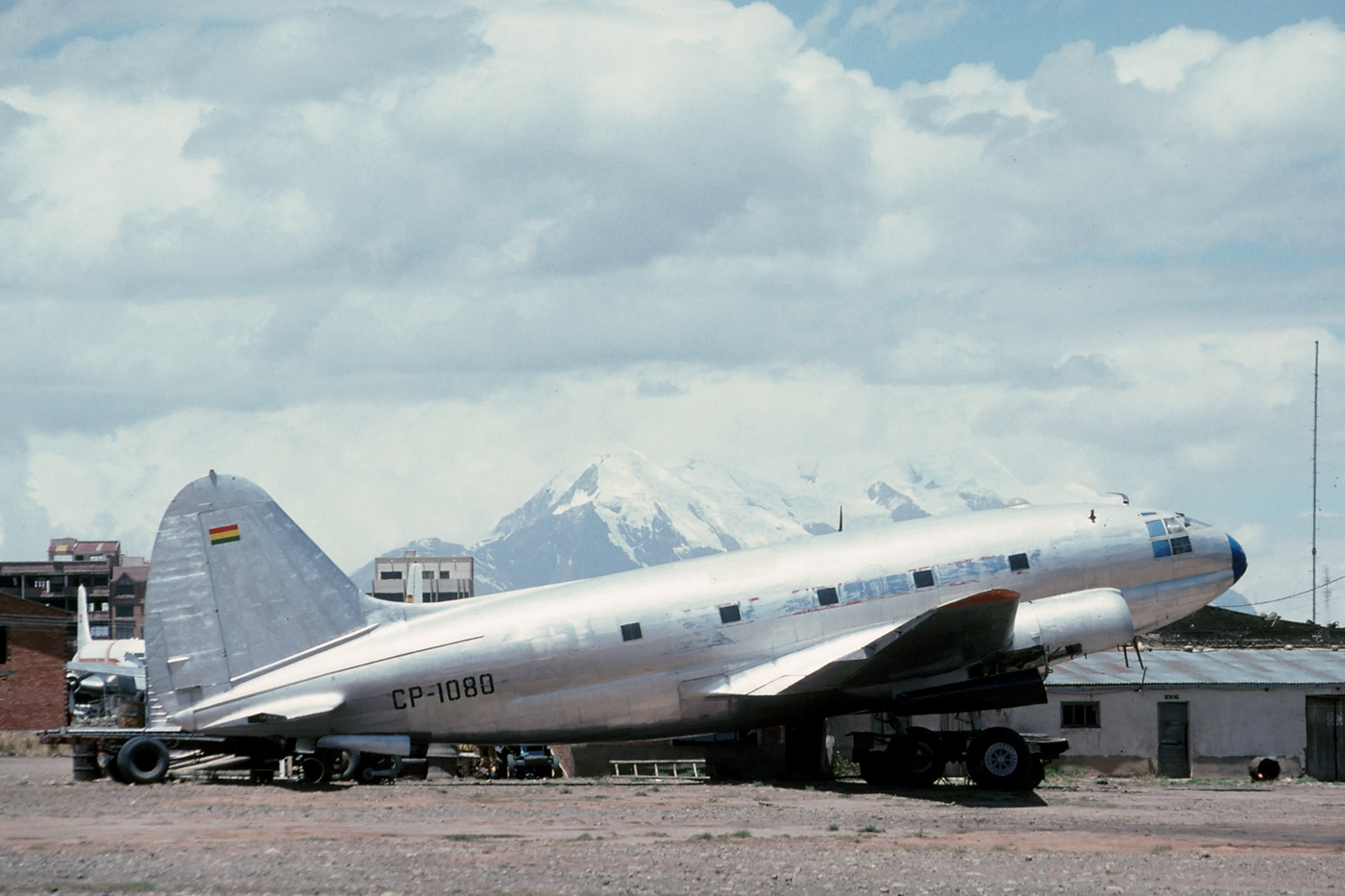
- Curtiss C-46 of Frigo Santa Rita
IATA	ICAO	Call sign
-	-	-
- Founded: 1970
- Ceased operations: 2001
- Fleet size: 2

Frigorifico Santa Rita was a Bolivian Airline based in Sitz in La Paz. The airline predominantly flew air freight but did fly passengers

== History ==
Frigorifico Santa was founded in 1970. It had a unique selling point which was its transport in meat, the airline would usually fly them from smaller airstrips in Bolivia in freezers.

In 2001 the airline had a fleet of two aircraft in its fleet, both of these were the Curtiss C 46 Commando with both being at least 56 years old.

== Airstrips ==
The smaller of the airfields listed above mostly lacked any navigational aids. The majority of the runways were unpaved, short, and often surrounded by obstacles such as trees. This made the approach and especially the takeoff of the heavily laden aircraft challenging, to say the least. Combined with often high temperatures, this led to overall high accident rates in Bolivian air traffic, and Frigorifico Santa Rita was not an execption.

== Fleet ==
=== Fleet in 2001 ===
The airline in 2001 operated the following aircraft,

- 2 Curtiss C-46 Commando

=== Historic fleet ===
- Douglas DC-3
- Douglas DC-6

== Accidents ==
- On June 9, 1975, the left main landing gear and tailwheel of a Frigorífico Santa Rita Curtiss C-46A-40-CU Commando (CP-855) failed to extend during approach, all occupants survived.
- On February 29, 1992, a Douglas DC-3A CP-529 of Frigorifico Santa Rita was destroyed by a fire at Carolita Ranch in Bolivia.
- On September 3 1993 a Curtiss C 46 crashed after an engine caught fire.

== See also ==
- List of defunct airlines of Bolivia
- SAVCO
