= First Nations Transportation =

First Nations Air Transport
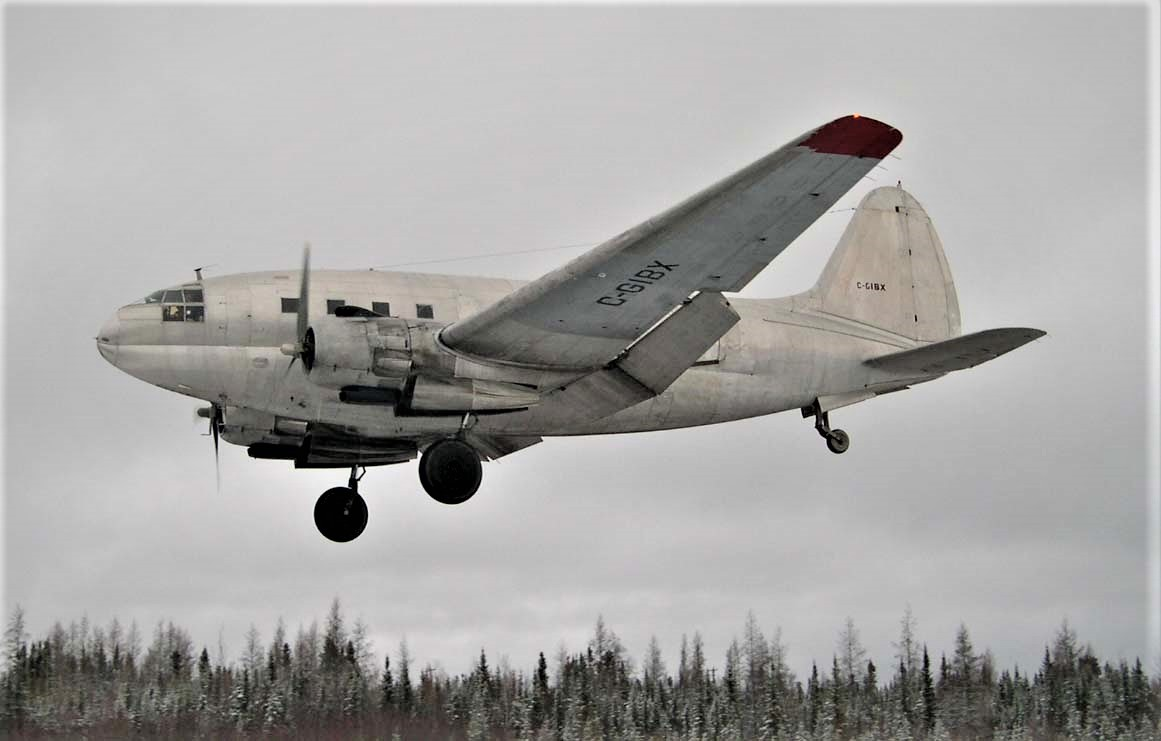
IATA	ICAO	Call sign
-	--	-
- Founded: 2003
- Ceased operations: April 2009
- Hubs: Gimli
- Fleet size: 4
- Destinations: Manitoba
- Employees: 20

First Nations Transportation was a Canadian freight airline from Gimli, Manitoba.

== History ==
Founded in 2003, it offered freight services to remote communities in Manitoba. It ceased operations in April 2009

laying off staff of 20 after their operating license was suspended by Transport Canada for safety and other violations.

== Destinations ==
The transport company served eight First Nations communities on the east side of Lake Winnipeg including St. Theresa Point, Manitoba and Garden Hill, Manitoba.

== Fleet ==
The company operated a fleet of two Curtiss C-46 and two Douglas C-47.

== See also ==
- List of defunct airlines of Canada
