= Northeast Bolivian Airways =

Bolivian airline, 1970–2006

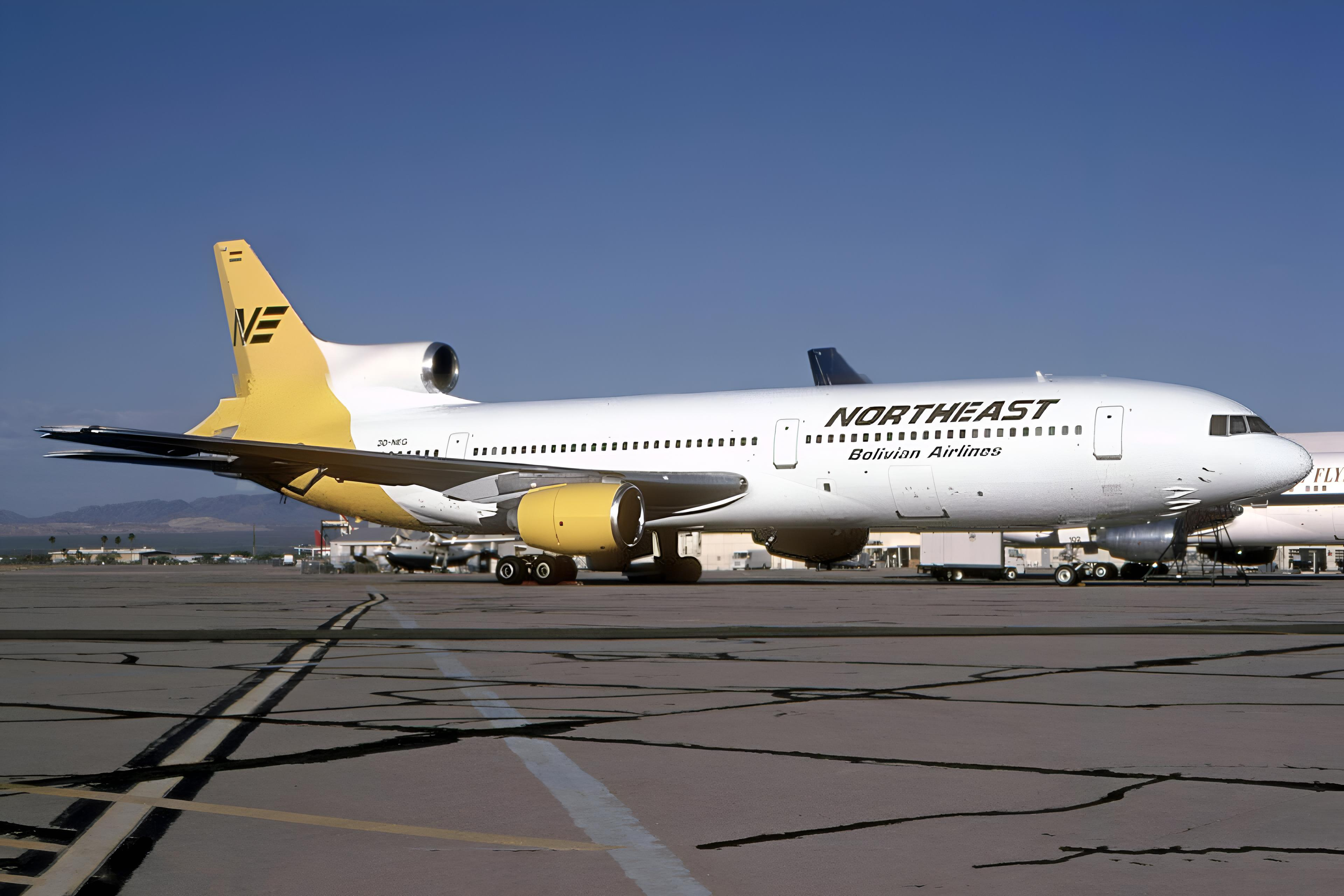
- Lockheed L-1011 (ED-NEG) of North East Bolivian Airways, in June 2007.
IATA	ICAO	Call sign
—	NBA	NEBA
- Founded: September 14, 1970
- Ceased operations: 2006
- Hubs: Jorge Wilstermann International Airport
- Headquarters: Cochabamba, Bolivia
- Website: nebolivianairlines.com

North East Bolivian Airways Ltda (NEBA for short) was a passenger charter airline based in Cochabamba, Bolivia from 1970 to 2006.

== History ==
Northeast Bolivian Airways was born in the city of Cochabamba on September 14, 1970. With two Convair CV-440 aircraft, which operated on local routes with passengers. In 1979, two Curtiss C-46 Commando aircraft were added to the fleet, serving the north and south of the country. In 1982, flights were expanded with another Convair CV-440. That same year the operation was expanded with a Douglas DC-4.

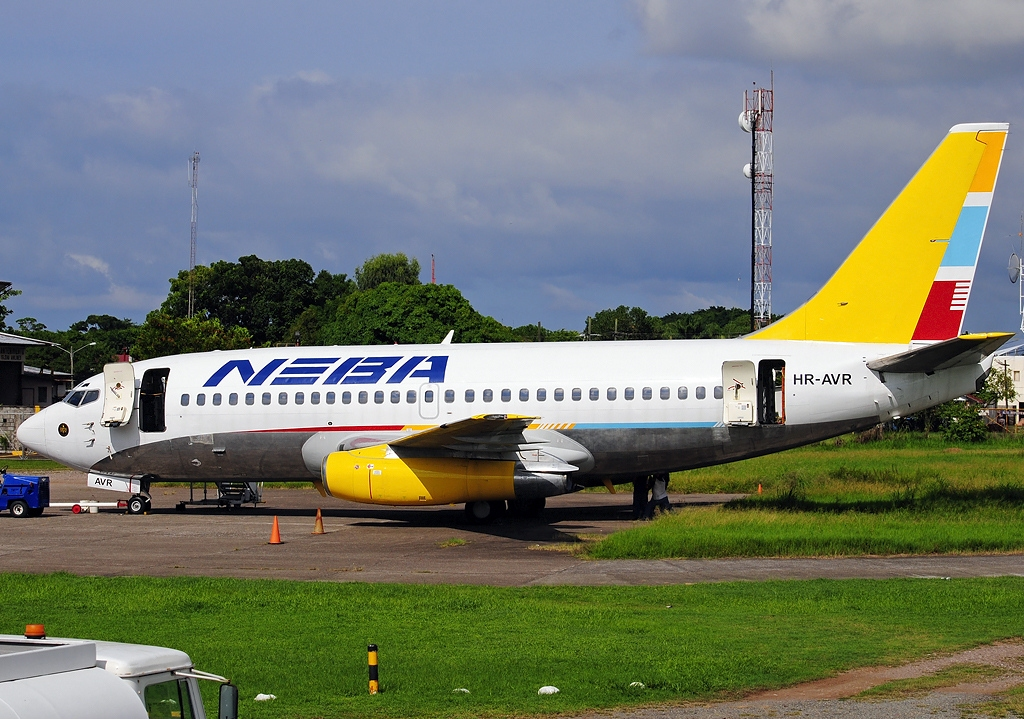
Boeing 737-200 (HR-AVR) of North East Bolivian Airways parked at Golosón International Airport in La Ceiba, Honduras (2012)

In 1990, operations were expanded with international flights to Miami with a Boeing 707-300. In 2004, NEBA sold a Convair CV-440 (CP-1040) to Copenhagen Airport in Denmark. In 2005, a Lockheed L-1011 Tristar and its crew arrived in Bolivia.

== Fleet ==
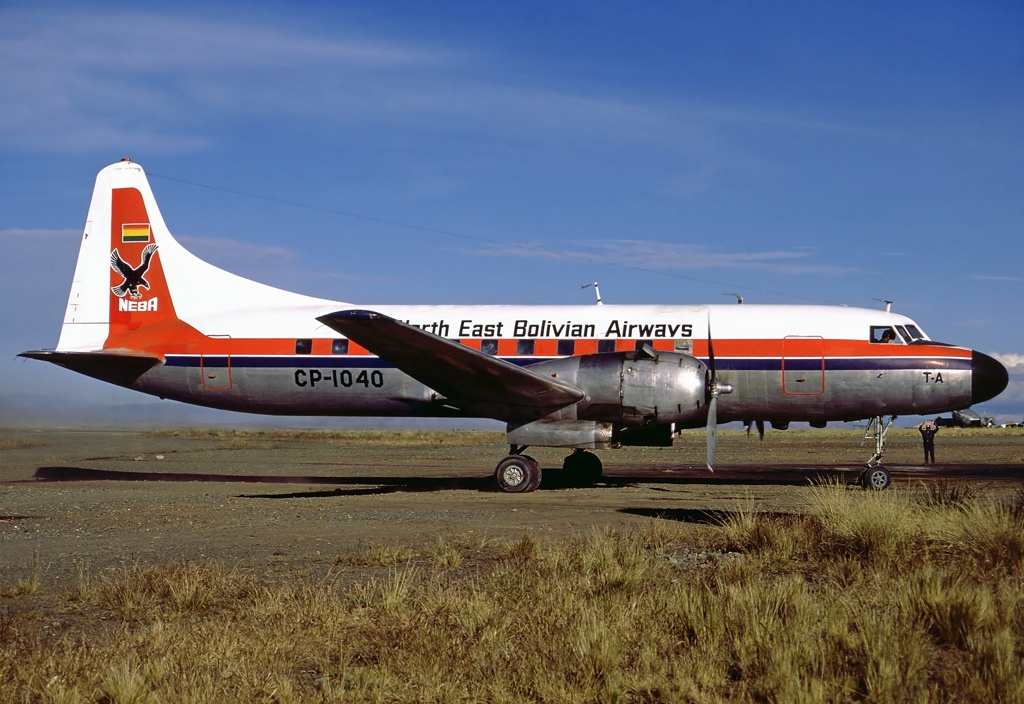
A NEBA Convair CV-440 Metropolitan parked at La Paz International Airport in 1990

NEBA formerly operated the following aircraft:

- 1 Boeing 737-200
- 1 Lockheed L-1011 TriStar

== Accidents and incidents ==
- On January 13, 1984, a Douglas C-54 Skymaster (registered CP-1090) attempted an emergency landing at Cochabamba after an engine failure. The aircraft was destroyed after the engine propellers contacted the runway; it ran off the side of the runway and struck a ditch. One of the three crew members on board was killed.

== See also ==
- List of defunct airlines of Bolivia
