= Transportes Aéreos Bolivianos =

Bolivian airline

IATA	ICAO	Call sign
2L	BOL	BOL
- Founded: 7 November 1977; 48 years ago
- Hubs: Viru Viru International Airport
- Fleet size: 1
- Destinations: 4
- Headquarters: Cochabamba, Bolivia
- Website: tab-bolivia.com

Transportes Aéreos Bolivianos (abbreviated TAB and also known as TAB Airlines or TAB Cargo) is a cargo airline which operates civil cargo flights between Bolivia and the United States.

== History ==
TAB was set up in 1977 as a sub-division of the Air Transport Management of the Bolivian Air Force in 1977, originally operating on-demand medium to long-haul heavy cargo flights using a fleet of Lockheed C-130 Hercules transport aircraft, which were based at El Alto International Airport in La Paz. In 1992, TAB was shut down.

In 1999, the airline was reactivated as a civil company based at Cochabamba, then operating a single military C-130 and a L-382, the civil variant of the preceding. In 1999, TAB moved 84,649 kilograms of cargo, which was increased to over 2 million kilograms in 2000, to 4,176,429 kilograms in 2006.

TAB increased its fleet with the addition of two McDonnell Douglas DC-10s. In 2022, the airline transported 326 metric tons of cargo.

== Destinations ==
As of May 2024, TAB operates scheduled flights to the following destinations:

Country	City	Airport	Notes
Bolivia	Cochabamba	Jorge Wilstermann International Airport	
Bolivia	La Paz	El Alto International Airport	
Bolivia	Santa Cruz de la Sierra	Viru Viru International Airport	Hub
United States	Miami	Miami International Airport	

TAB additionally serves a wide range of charter routes.

== Fleet ==
=== Current fleet ===
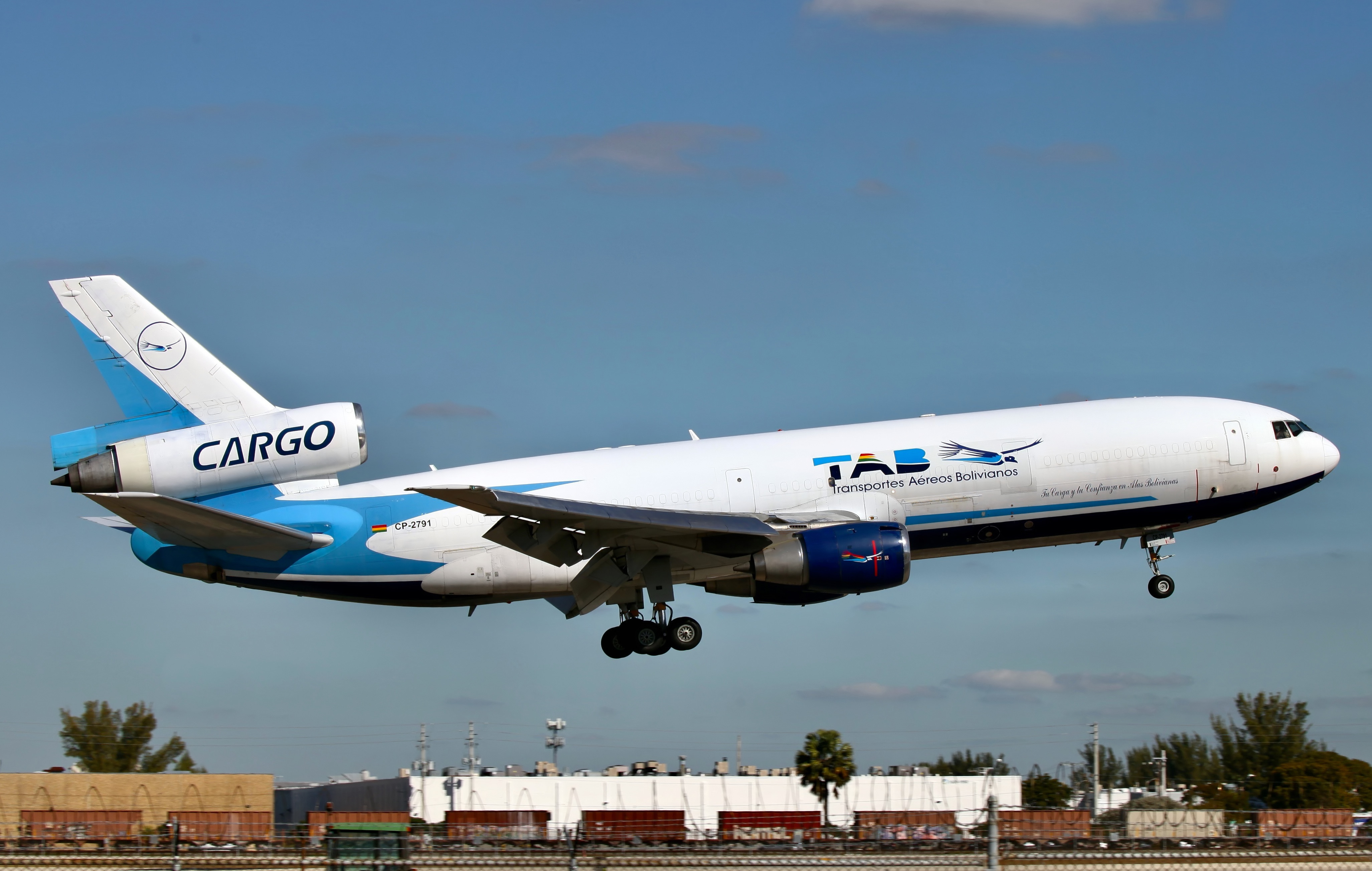
TAB's sole McDonnell Douglas MD-10-30F at Miami International Airport in 2023.

As of August 2025, Transportes Aéreos Bolivianos operates the following aircraft:

TAB fleet
Aircraft	In service	Orders	Notes
McDonnell Douglas MD-10-30F	1	—	Seen parked and being maintained in Viru Viru International airport, Santa Cruz de la Sierra.
Total	1	—	

=== Former fleet ===
TAB former fleet
Aircraft	Total	Introduced	Retired	Notes
Lockheed C-130 Hercules	3	1979	2015	Transferred to the Bolivian Air Force
Lockheed L-100 Hercules	1	1980	1990	
Douglas DC-8-54CF	1	1991	1999	Leased from Transconsult Ltd
McDonnell Douglas DC-10-10F	1	2007	2014	
McDonnell Douglas DC-10-30F	1	2008	2016	

== See also ==
- List of airlines of Bolivia
