= Curtiss C-46 Commando =

U.S. military transport aircraft with 2 piston engines, 1940

C-46 Commando
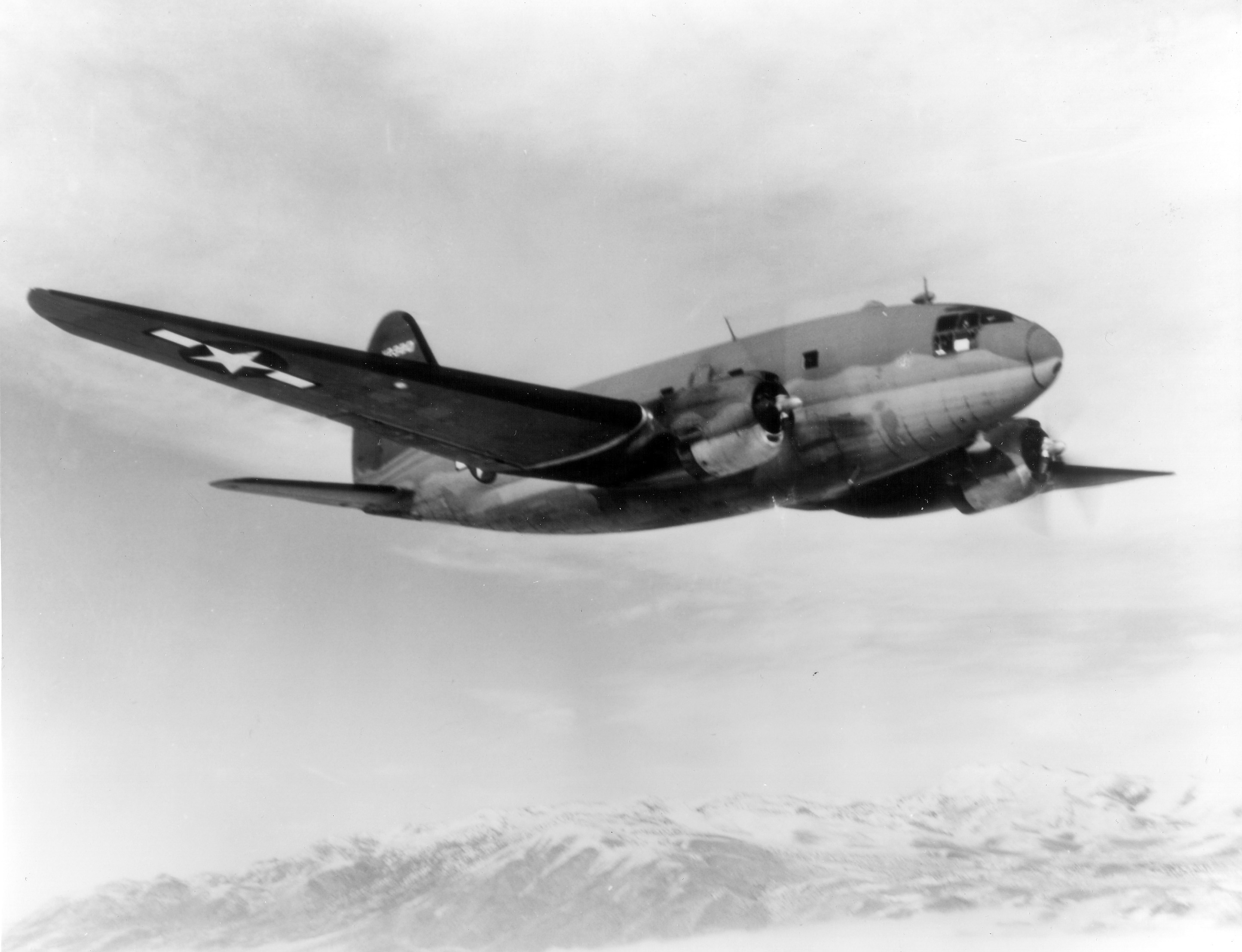
- A wartime photograph of a U.S. Army Air Forces (USAAF) C-46 Commando

General information
- Type: Military transport aircraft
- National origin: United States
- Manufacturer: Curtiss-Wright; Higgins Aircraft
- Status: Active in limited civilian use
- Primary users: Buffalo Airways United States Air Force; United States Marine Corps; United States Navy
- Number built: 3,181

History
- Manufactured: 1940–1945
- Introduction date: 1941
- First flight: 26 March 1940

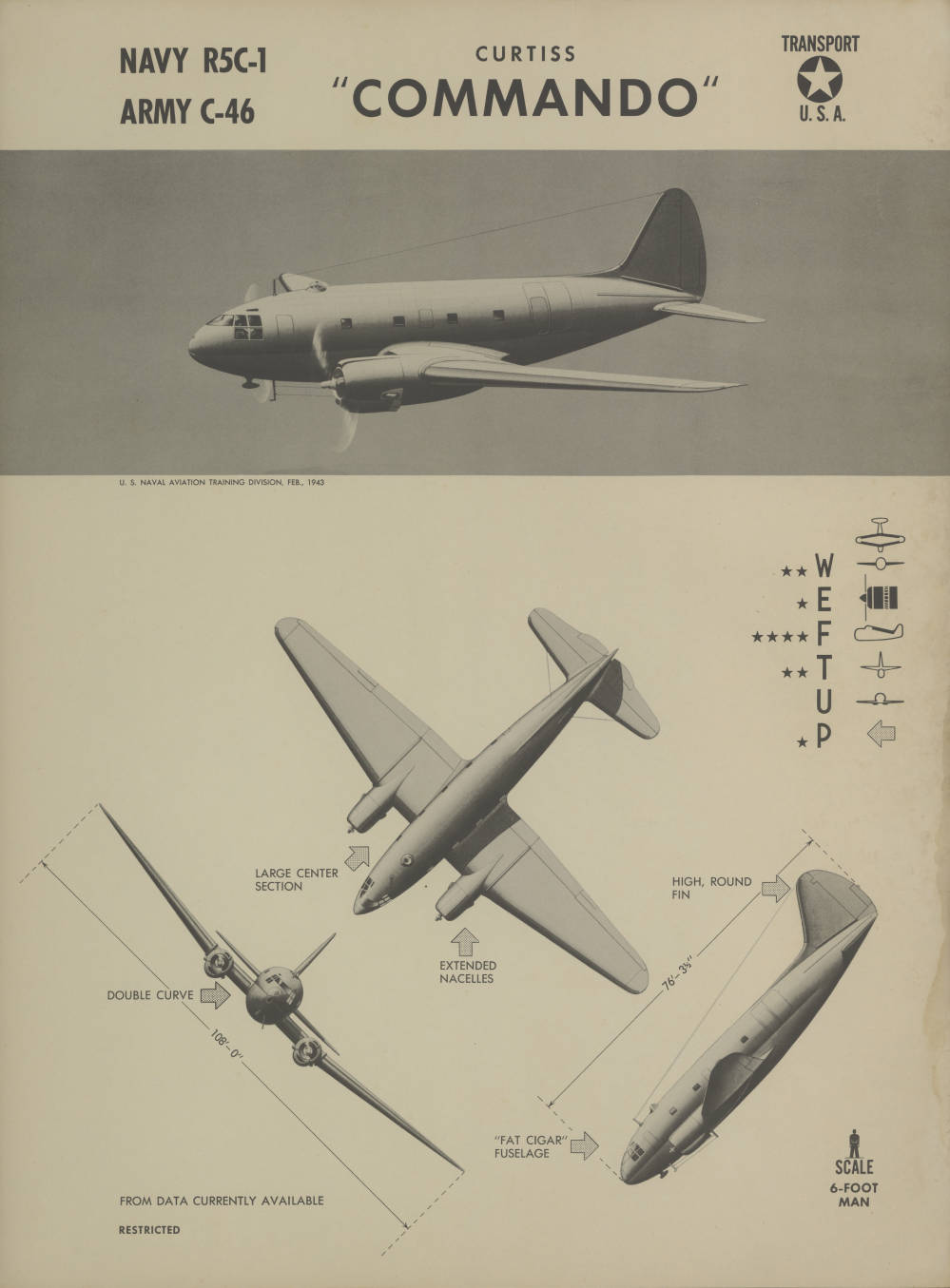
World War II US Navy Recognition Chart for Curtiss C-46

The Curtiss C-46 Commando is a low-wing, twin-engine aircraft derived from the Curtiss CW-20 pressurized high-altitude airliner design. Early press reports used the name "Condor III" but the Commando name was in use by early 1942 in company publicity. It was used primarily as a cargo aircraft during World War II, with fold-down seating for military transport and some use in delivering paratroops. Mainly deployed by the United States Army Air Forces, it also served the U.S. Navy/Marine Corps, which called it R5C. The C-46 filled similar roles as its Douglas-built counterpart, the C-47 Skytrain, with some 3,200 C-46s produced to approximately 10,200 C-47s.

After World War II, commercial adoption lagged when the C-46 was unable to meet certification requirements for passenger service by scheduled airlines in the United States. Some scheduled carriers (including the first scheduled cargo airlines) flew it for cargo. So-called irregular air carriers, subject to separate rules, flew C-46s for both freight and passenger flights. Accidents in the early 1950s drove the Federal government to crack down, limiting C-46 takeoff weights and forcing operators to modify the aircraft to meet modern requirements. Nonetheless, almost 400 C-46s were in airline service globally in 1960. The C-46 continued in U.S. Air Force service in a secondary role until 1968. The aircraft continues in limited operation as a rugged cargo transport for arctic and remote locations with its service life extended into the 21st century.

== Design and development ==
The prototype for what would become the C-46, the Curtiss CW-20, was designed in 1937 by George A. Page Jr., the chief aircraft designer at Curtiss-Wright. The CW-20 was a private venture intended to compete with the four-engined Douglas DC-4 and Boeing 307 Stratoliner by the introduction of a new standard in pressurized airliners. The CW-20 had a patented fuselage conventionally referred to as a "figure-eight" (or "double-bubble"), which enabled it to better withstand the pressure differential at high altitudes. The sides of the fuselage creased at the level of the floor that separated the two portions and shared in the stress of each, rather than supporting itself. The main spar of the wing could pass through the bottom section, which was mainly intended for cargo, without intruding on the passenger upper compartment. A decision to use a twin-engine design instead of a four-engines was considered viable if sufficiently powerful engines were available, allowing for lower operating costs and a less complex structure.

Engineering work involved a three-year commitment from the company and incorporated an extensive amount of wind tunnel testing at the California Institute of Technology (Caltech). The resultant design was a large, aerodynamically "sleek" airliner, incorporating the cockpit in a streamlined glazed "dome". The engines featured a unique nacelle tunnel cowl where air was induced and expelled through the bottom of the cowl, reducing turbulent airflow and induced drag across the upper wing surface. After a mock-up was constructed in 1938, Curtiss-Wright exhibited the innovative project as a display in the 1939 New York World's Fair.

The company approached many airlines to obtain their requirements for an advanced airliner. No firm orders resulted, although 25 letters of intent were received, sufficient to begin production. The design of a 24–34 passenger airliner proceeded to the prototype stage as the CW-20 at the St. Louis, Missouri facility with the initial configuration featuring twin vertical tail surfaces. Powered by two 1,700 hp (1,300 kW) R-2600-C14-BA2 Wright Twin Cyclones, the prototype, registered NX-19436 flew for the first time on 26 March 1940 with test pilot Edmund T. "Eddie" Allen at the controls. After testing, modifications, including the fitting of a large single tail to improve stability at low speeds were made.

The first prototype was purchased by the United States Army Air Corps (USAAC) to serve as a master for the series and was named C-55. After military evaluation, the sole example was returned to Curtiss-Wright and subsequently re-sold to the British Overseas Airways Corporation (BOAC). During testing, General Henry H. "Hap" Arnold became interested in the potential of the airliner as a military cargo transport and on 13 September 1940, ordered 46 modified CW-20As as the C-46-CU Commando; the last 21 aircraft in this order were delivered as Model CW-20Bs, called C-46A-1-CU. None of the C-46s purchased by the U.S. military were pressurized and the first 30 delivered to the AAC were sent back to the factory for 53 immediate modifications. The design was then modified to the C-46A, receiving enlarged cargo doors, a strengthened load floor and a convertible cabin that speeded changes in carrying freight and troops. The C-46 was introduced to the public at a ceremony in May 1942, attended by its designer, George A. Page Jr.

A total of 200 C-46As in two batches were ordered in 1940, although only two were actually delivered by 7 December 1941. An important change was made: more powerful 2,000 hp (1,500 kW)c Pratt & Whitney R-2800 Double Wasp engines replaced the Twin Cyclones. By November 1943, 721 modifications had been made to production models, although many were minor, such as fuel system changes and a reduction in cabin windows. Subsequent military contracts for the C-46A extended the production run to 1,454 examples, 40 of which were destined for the U.S. Marine Corps, to be called R5C-1. The military model was fitted with double cargo doors, a strengthened floor and a hydraulically operated cargo handling winch; 40 folding seats were the sole passenger accommodation for what was essentially a cargo hauler. Two C-46 were delivered from Higgins Industries Michoud Factory Field in 1942.

The final large production-run C-46D arrived in 1944–45 and featured single doors to facilitate paratroop drops. Production totaled 1,430 aircraft. Although a one-off XC-46B experimented with a stepped windscreen and more powerful engines, a small run of 17 C-46Es had many of the same features as the XC-46B, along with three-bladed Hamilton-Standard propellers replacing the standard Curtiss-Electric four-bladed units. A last contract for 234 C-46Fs reverted to the earlier cockpit shape but introduced square wing tips. A sole C-46G had the stepped windscreen and square wing tips but the end of the war resulted in the cancellation of any additional orders for the type.

== Operational history ==
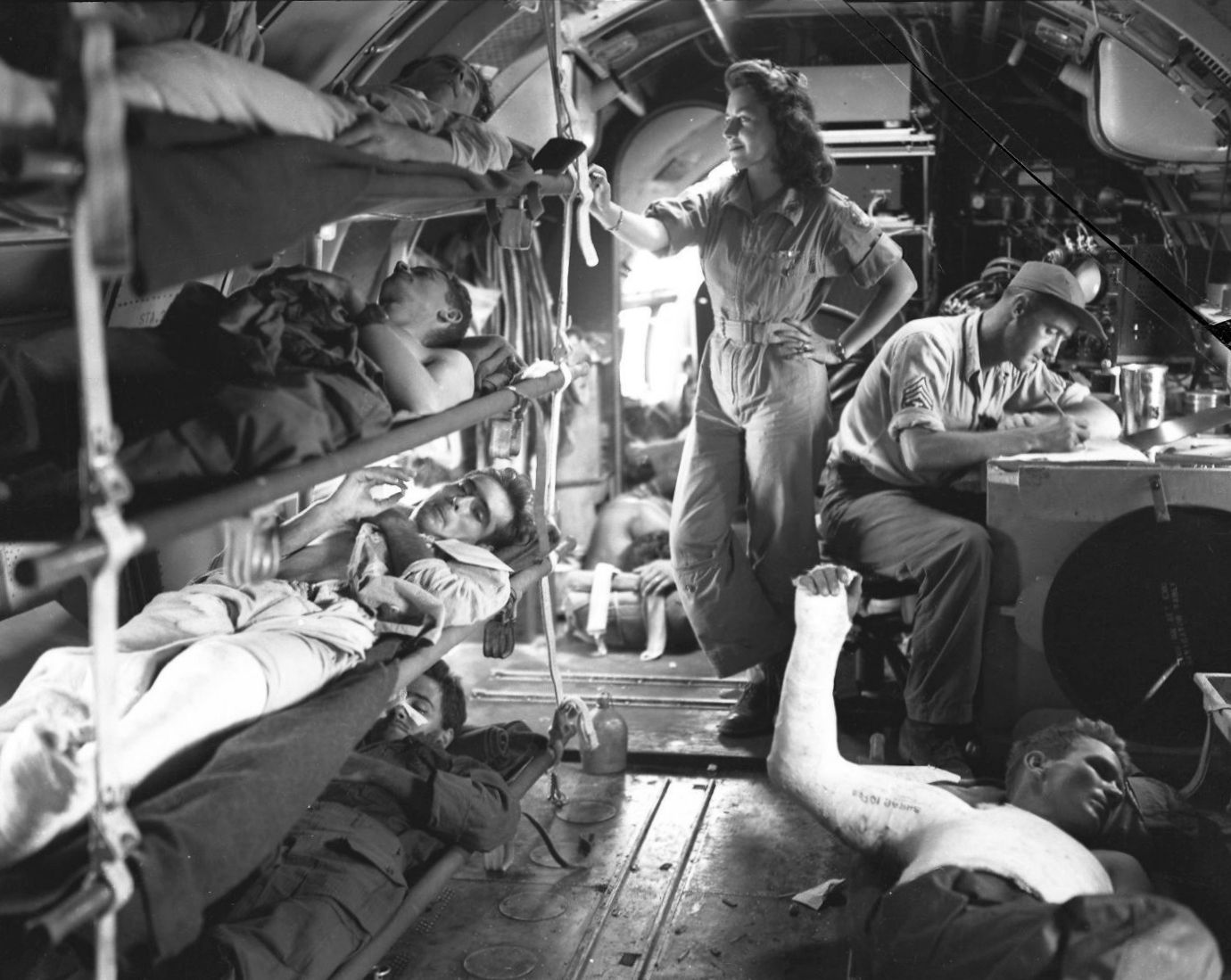
A U.S. C-46 aircraft conducting an aerial evacuation of wounded American troops from Manila, the capital of the Philippines, shortly after U.S. forces retook the city after intense fighting with the Japanese.

=== Pacific Theater ===
Most famous for its operations in the China-Burma-India theater (CBI) and the Far East, the Commando was a workhorse in flying over "The Hump" (as the Himalaya Mountains were nicknamed by Allied airmen), transporting desperately needed supplies to troops in China from bases in India. A variety of transports had been employed in the campaign but only the C-46 was able to handle the wide range of adverse conditions encountered by the USAAF. Unpredictably violent weather, heavy cargo loads, high mountain terrain, and poorly equipped and frequently flooded airfields proved a considerable challenge to the transport aircraft then in service, along with a host of engineering and maintenance nightmares due to a shortage of trained air and ground personnel.

After a series of mechanical problems were controlled if not surmounted, the C-46 proved its worth in the airlift operation despite maintenance headaches. It could carry more cargo higher than other Allied twin-engine transport aircraft in the theater, including light artillery, fuel, ammunition, parts of aircraft and, on occasion, livestock. Its powerful engines enabled it to climb satisfactorily with heavy loads, staying aloft on one engine if not overloaded, though "war emergency" load limits of up to 40,000 lb (18,000 kg) often erased any safety margins. After the troublesome Curtiss-Electric electrically controlled pitch mechanism on the propellers had been removed, the C-46 continued to be employed in the CBI and over wide areas of southern China throughout the war years. Even so, the C-46 was referred to by ATC pilots as the "flying coffin" with at least 31 known instances of fires or explosions in flight between May 1943 and March 1945 and many others missing and never found. Other names used by the men who flew them were "The Whale", the "Curtiss Calamity", and the "plumber's nightmare". The C-46's huge cargo volume (twice that of the C-47), three times the weight, large cargo doors, powerful engines and long range also made it suitable for the vast distances of the Pacific island campaign. In particular, the U.S. Marines found the aircraft (known as the R5C) useful in their amphibious Pacific operations, flying supplies in and wounded personnel out of numerous and hastily built island landing strips.

=== Europe ===
Although built in approximately one-third the number as its more famous wartime compatriot, the C-47 Skytrain, the C-46 nevertheless played a significant role in wartime operations, although the aircraft was not deployed in numbers to the European theater until March 1945. It augmented USAAF Troop Carrier Command in time to drop paratroopers in an offensive to cross the Rhine River in Germany (Operation Varsity). So many C-46s were lost in the paratroop drop during Varsity that Army General Matthew Ridgway issued an edict forbidding the aircraft's use in airborne operations. Even though the war ended soon afterwards and no further airborne missions were flown, the C-46 may well have been unfairly demonized. The operation's paratroop drop phase was flown in daylight at low speeds at very low altitudes by an unarmed cargo aircraft without self-sealing fuel tanks, over heavy concentrations of German 20 mm, 37 mm and larger caliber anti-aircraft (AA) cannon firing explosive, incendiary and armor-piercing incendiary ammunition. By that stage of the war, German AA crews had trained to a high state of readiness; many batteries had considerable combat experience in firing on and destroying high-speed, well-armed fighters and fighter-bombers while under fire themselves. Most, if not all, of the C-47s used in Operation Varsity had been fitted with self-sealing fuel tanks; the C-46s had not. Although 19 of 72 C-46 aircraft were shot down during Varsity, it is not as well known that losses of other aircraft types from AA fire during the same operation were equally as intense, including 13 gliders shot down, 14 crashed and 126 badly damaged; 15 B-24 bombers shot down and 104 badly damaged; 12 C-47s shot down, with 140 damaged.

=== Design shortcomings ===
Despite its obvious and valuable utility, the C-46 remained a maintenance nightmare throughout its AAF career. The official history of the Army Air Forces summarized its shortcomings,

But from first to last, the Commando remained a headache. It could be kept flying only at the cost of thousands of extra man-hours for maintenance and modification. Although Curtiss-Wright reported the accumulation by November 1943 of the astounding total of 721 required changes in production models, the plane continued to be what maintenance crews around the world aptly described as a "plumber's nightmare". Worse still, the plane was a killer. In the experienced hands of Eastern Air Lines and along a route that provided more favorable flying conditions than were confronted by military crews in Africa and on the Hump route into China, the plane did well enough. Indeed, Eastern Air Lines lost only one C-46 in more than two years of operation. But among the ATC pilots the Commando was known, with good reason, as the "flying coffin". From May 1943 to March 1945, Air Transport Command received reports of thirty-one instances in which C-46s caught fire or exploded in the air. Still others were listed merely as "missing in flight", and it is a safe assumption that many of these exploded, went down in flames, or crashed as the result of vapor lock, carburetor icing, or other defects.

During the war years, the C-46 had an abnormal number of unexplained airborne explosions (31 between May 1943 and May 1945) that were attributed to various causes. In particular, the fuel system, which was quickly designed, then modified for the new, thirstier Pratt & Whitney engines, was criticized. The cause of the explosions was eventually traced to pooled gasoline from small leaks in the tanks and fuel system, combined with a spark, usually originating from open-contact electrical components. Though many service aircraft suffered small fuel leaks in use, the C-46's wings were unvented; if a leak occurred, the gasoline had nowhere to drain, but rather pooled at the wing root. Any spark or fire could set off an explosion. After the war, all C-46 aircraft received a wing vent modification to vent pooled gasoline, and an explosion-proof fuel booster pump was installed with shielded electrical selector switches in lieu of the open-contact type used originally.

=== Postwar ===
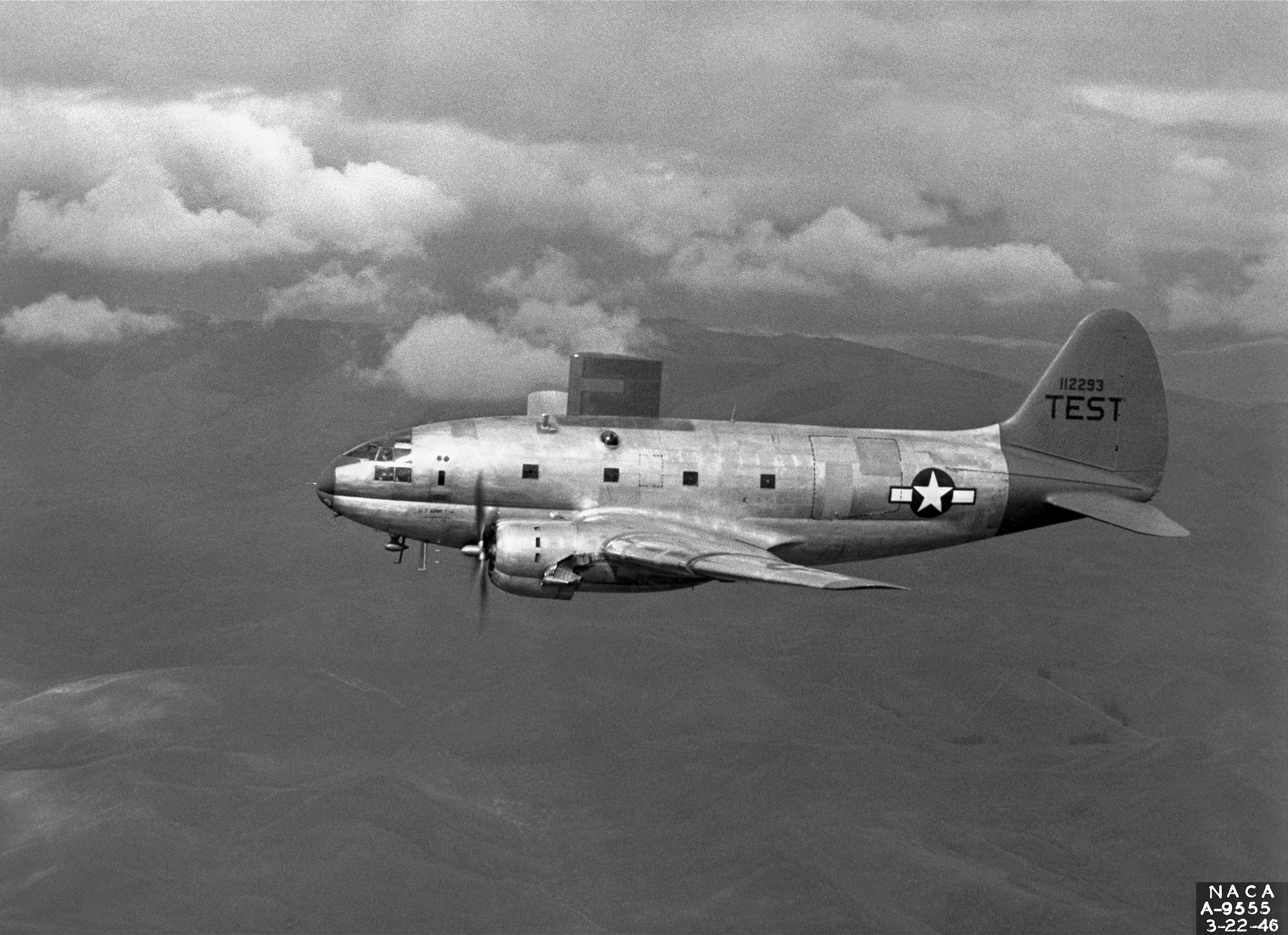
C-46A being used for research in 1946, by NACA (Predecessor to NASA)

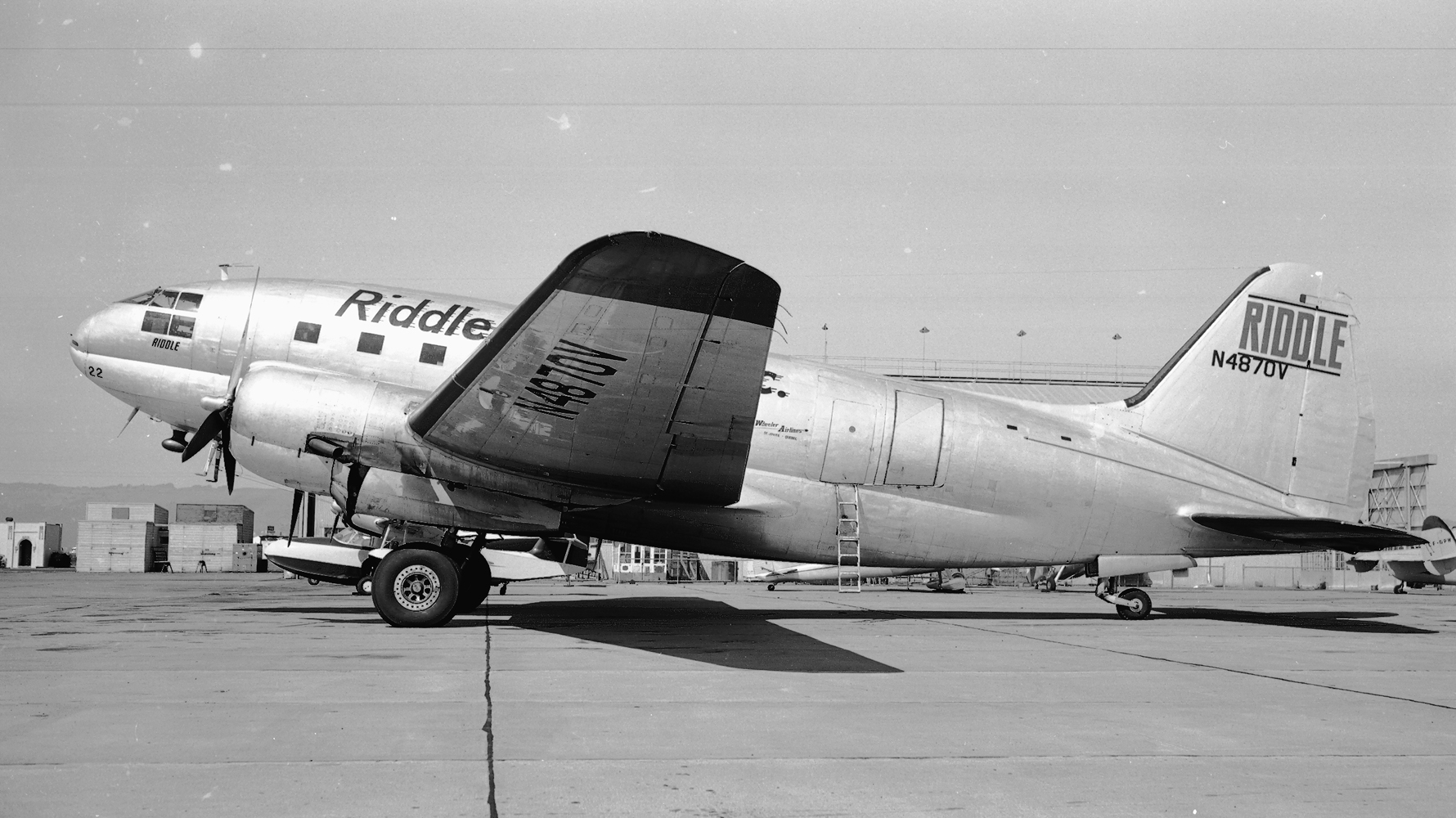
Riddle Airlines at Oakland 1955. Riddle had several dozen C-46s and originated one of the modification packages (C-46R) to bring the aircraft up to scheduled passenger transport standards

==== Certification and modification ====
In 1944, the CW-20E model was ordered by National Airlines and Eastern Air Lines, but those orders were cancelled, citing the huge number of surplus aircraft on the market. The C-46 was originally unable to be certificated as a scheduled passenger transport aircraft in the United States. It was flown by such airlines in a freight role, and it was also flown in passenger service by irregular air carriers, which operated according to separate rules. Commercial adoption of the C-46 also had to await development of conversion programs. In 1946, there were over 600 surplus C-46 aircraft, but only around 15 were certificated for civilian service. The pioneering freight operator Slick Airways acquired 10 of them. Other civilian operators had to wait until conversion programs were developed. Slick would write off six of its initial 10 C-46s in accidents by 1951, four of them fatal.

In January 1952, an emergency US regulation was imposed in response to a number of irregular air carrier C-46 accidents that reduced maximum gross weight for passenger flights from 48,000 to 45,000lbs. This was further reduced to 44,300lbs in 1953. This drove development of so-called "T-category" C-46s that could meet passenger transport standards, which the Civil Aeronautics Board (CAB) mandated by 1956. The process was complicated by the fact that Curtiss-Wright was no longer a manufacturer. The Aircraft Engineering Foundation (AEF), a non-profit backed by operators of C-46s, was created as a substitute. As well as sponsoring a modification responsive to the CAB's mandate, the AEF also improved C-46 maintenance and pilot training. The AEF believed most C-46 accidents were traceable to deficiencies in these areas.

There were three modification packages:

- The Super 46 was AEF's kit.
- The CW-20T was a more expensive upgrade offered by L.B. Smith of Miami (confusingly, L.B. Smith was also one of several vendors that installed the Super 46 kit). (This was a second use of the term CW-20T, as it was also what the original twin-tail version of the CW-20 was designated).
- Riddle Airlines (later known as Airlift International), a scheduled freight operator, created its own mod called the C-46R, which it applied to its fleet of 35 C-46s and sold to other airlines.

The most significant issue addressed by all mods was engine overheating when at emergency power, obviously undesirable in engine-out situations.

When, in 1956, a decade after World War II, US scheduled passenger carrier Northeast Airlines put a 40-seat CW-20T (dubbed a "Curtiss Commuter") into service between Boston and Montreal, this was noted as being "the first C-46 type to go into scheduled service" (meaning US scheduled passenger service).

==== Operators ====
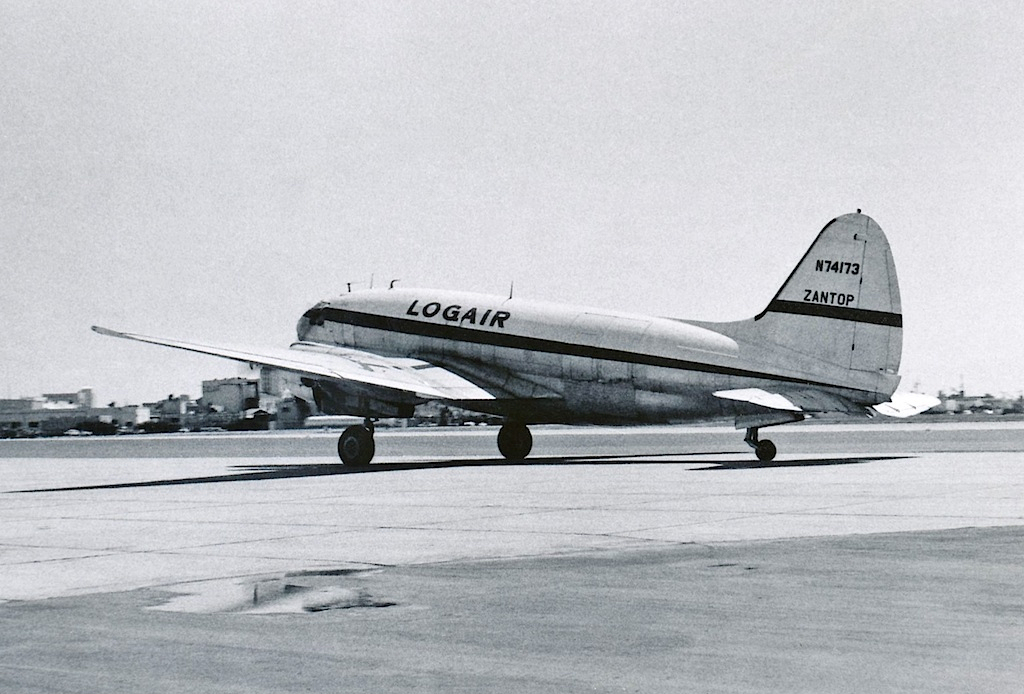
C-46 of Zantop Air Transport flying for the US Air Force Logair program 1962

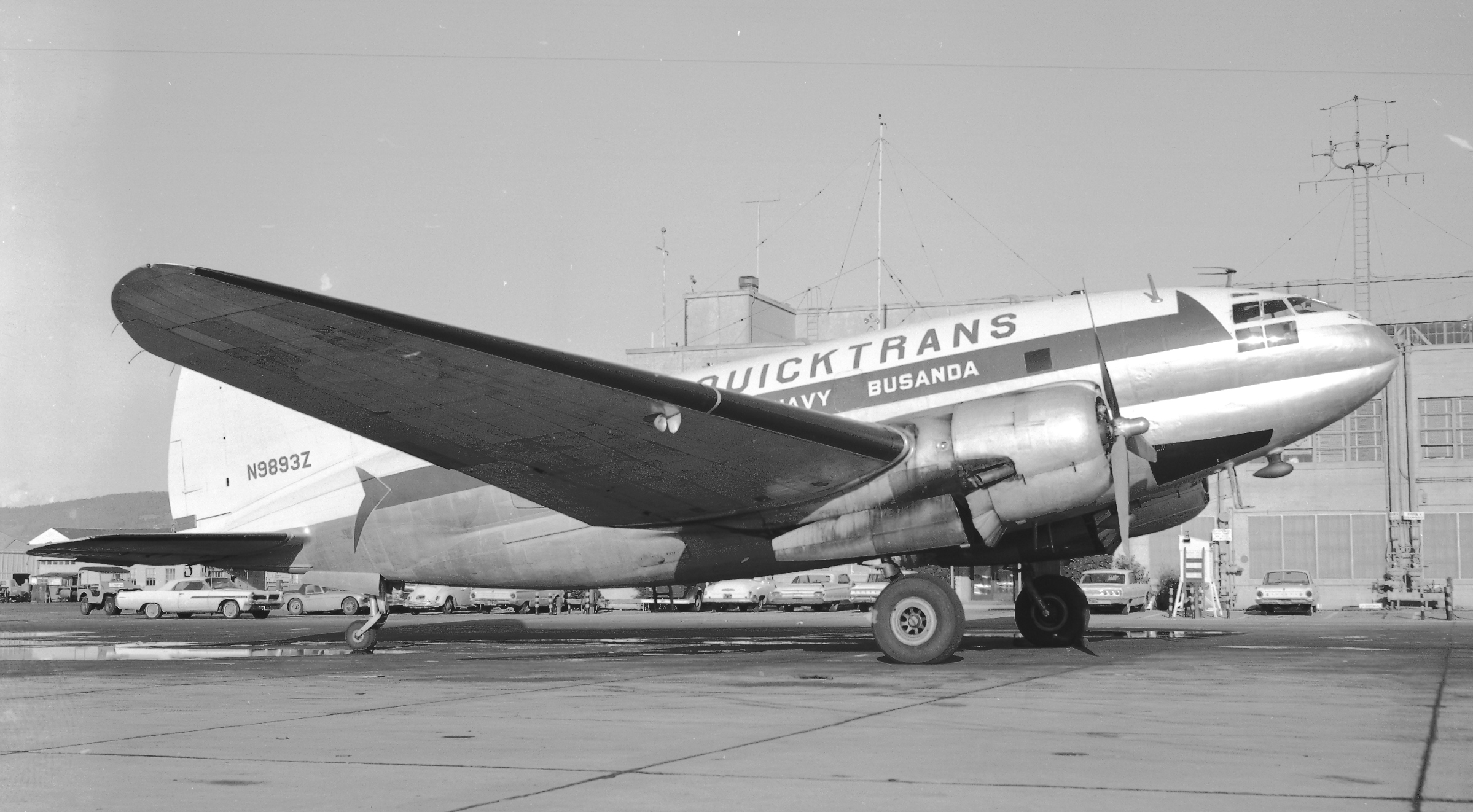
C-46 of Capitol Airways flying for the US Navy Quicktrans program 1965

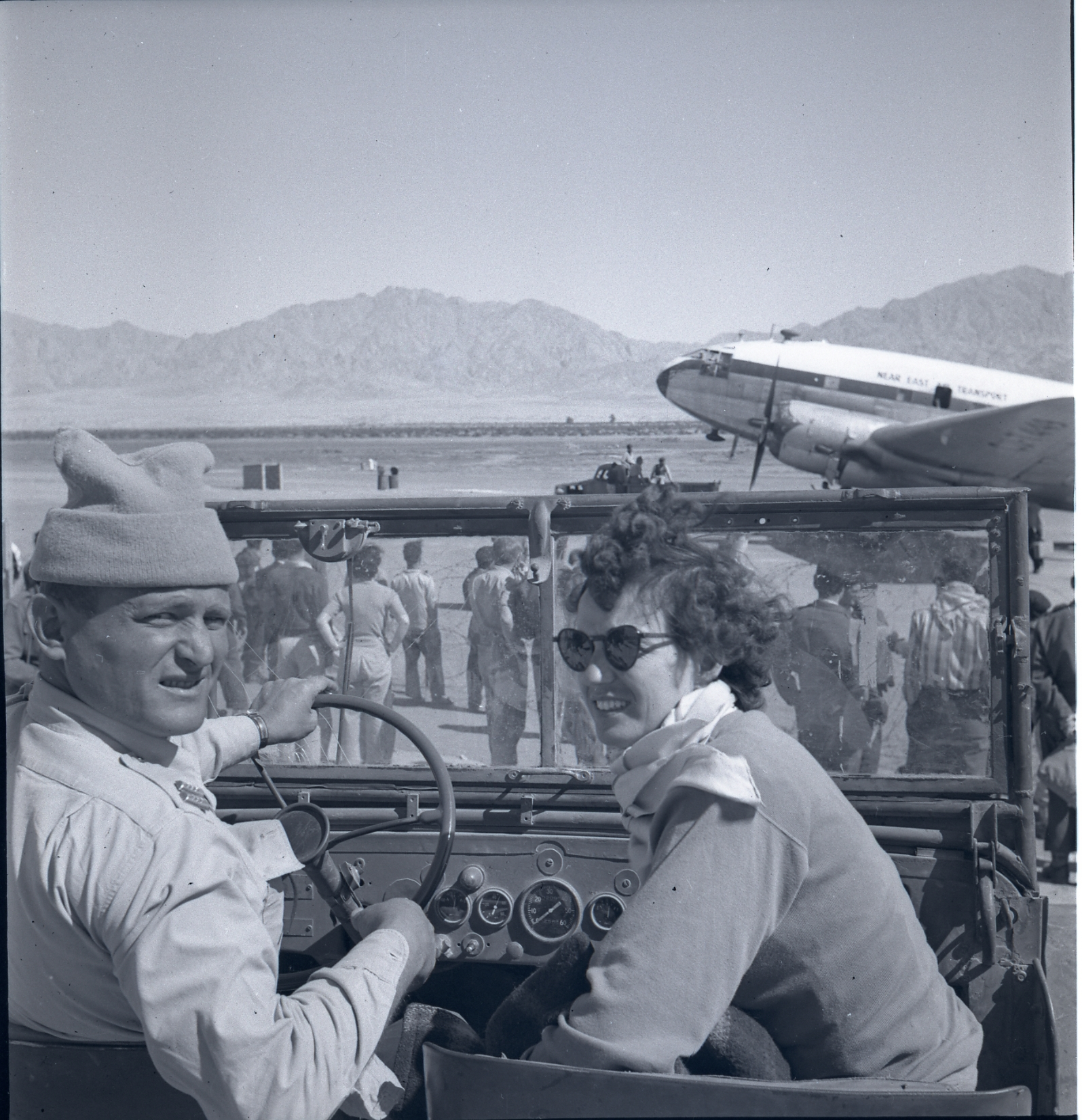
Cuban-registered aircraft of a US carrier, Near East Air Transport, in Israel, 1950

As of January 1951, of 188 transport aircraft at US irregular airlines, 92 were C-46s as opposed to 52 DC-3s and 40 DC-4s. Such airlines, later known as supplemental air carriers, were substantial operators of C-46s over the years. Examples include Capitol Airways, AAXICO Airlines and Zantop Air Transport. At year-end 1967, Zantop successor Universal Airlines still had 32 C-46s in its fleet. As previously mentioned, scheduled freight carriers such as Slick and Riddle and Flying Tiger Line were also significant operators. Two drivers of C-46 demand were the US Air Force Logair and US Navy Quicktrans domestic air freight programs, both of which launched with the type. For instance, in 1960, Capitol Airways flew 40 C-46s under contract to Logair. Quicktrans contracted for a number of C-46s as late as 1966, leading the US Congress to complain.

Many other small carriers also eventually operated the type on scheduled and non-scheduled routes. The C-46 became a common sight in South America and was widely used in Bolivia, Peru, Brazil, Argentina and Chile, especially in mountainous areas (where a good climb rate and high service ceiling were required) or to overfly deep jungle terrain where ground transport was impracticable. In 1960, Flight counted 356 C-46s in service among 91 carriers in the Americas, and 35 among ten airlines in the rest of the world.

C-46 Commandos also went back to war. A dozen surplus C-46's were purchased in the United States covertly for use in Israel's 1948 war for independence and flown to Czechoslovakia in a circuitous route along South America and then across to Africa. The type's long range proved invaluable in flying cargo, including desperately needed dismantled S-199 fighters from Czechoslovakia as well as other weapons and military supplies. On the return flight the C-46's would dump bombs out the cargo door on various targets at night, including Gaza, El Arish, Majdal, and Faluja (Egypt and Israel also used C-47s as bombers and transports locally). C-46's served in Korea and Vietnam for various U.S. Air Force operations, including supply missions, paratroop drops and clandestine agent transportation. The C-46 was also employed in the abortive U.S.-supported Bay of Pigs invasion in 1961. The C-46 was not officially retired from service with the U.S. Air Force until 1968.

The type served in the Central Intelligence Agency (CIA). The C-46 played a supporting role in many clandestine operations during the late 1940s and early 1950s, including supply efforts to Chiang Kai-Shek's troops battling Mao's Communists in China as well as flying cargoes of military and medical supplies to French forces via Gialam Airfield in Hanoi and other bases in French Indochina. The CIA operated its own "airline" for these operations, Civil Air Transport, which was eventually renamed Air America in 1959. An Air America C-46 was the last fixed-wing aircraft flown out of Vietnam [Saigon] at the close of hostilities there. On 29 April 1975, Capt. E. G. Adams flew a 52-seat version, with 152 people on board, to Bangkok, Thailand.

The Japan Air Self-Defense Force used the Commando until at least 1978. The Republic of China Air Force operated the C-46 up until 1982 before it was retired. Although their numbers began to dwindle, C-46s continued to operate in remote locations and could be seen in service from Canada and Alaska to Africa and South America. In the late 1970s and early 1980s, the Canadian airline Lamb Air operated several C-46s from their bases in Thompson and Churchill, Manitoba. One of the largest C-46 operators was Air Manitoba, whose fleet of aircraft featured gaudy color schemes for individual aircraft. In the 1990s, these aircraft were sold to other owner/operators. Between 1993 and 1995, Relief Air Transport operated three Canadian registered C-46s on Operation Lifeline Sudan from Lokichoggio, Kenya. These aircraft also transported humanitarian supplies to Goma, Zaire and Mogadishu, Somalia from their base in Nairobi, Kenya. One of the aircraft (C-GIXZ) was lost near Lokichoggio while the remaining two (C-GTXW & C-GIBX) eventually made their way back to Canada. These two aircraft were then operated as freighters for First Nations Transportation in Gimli, Manitoba but the airline later ceased operations with one aircraft sold to Buffalo Airways and the other tied up in receivership. According to First Nations Transport, as of Jan 2016, the latter aircraft (C-GIBX) was claimed to be airworthy with two new engines and available for sale with the fire bottles and props needing updates. The other former First Nations Transportation C-46 (C-GTXW) flew for Buffalo Airways until it was scrapped in 2015. Two aircraft of the same type (C-GTPO and C-FAVO) continue to be used by the same carrier primarily in Canada's Arctic. They have been featured on the Ice Pilots NWT television show. Prices for a used C-46 in 1960 ranged from £20,000 for a C-46F conversion, to £60,000 for a C-46R.

== Variants ==
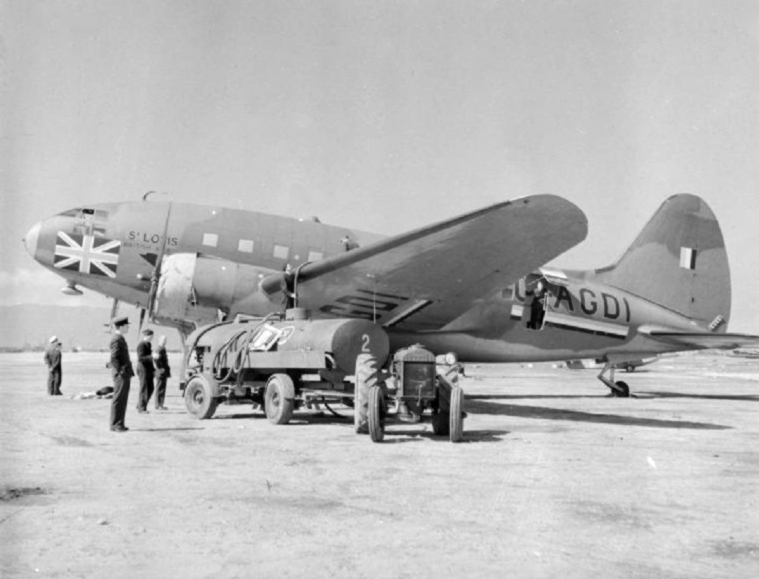
"St. Louis", the BOAC CW-20A at Gibraltar, 1941–42. Was previously C-55 with Curtiss and USAAC, after conversion from twin-tail CW-20T

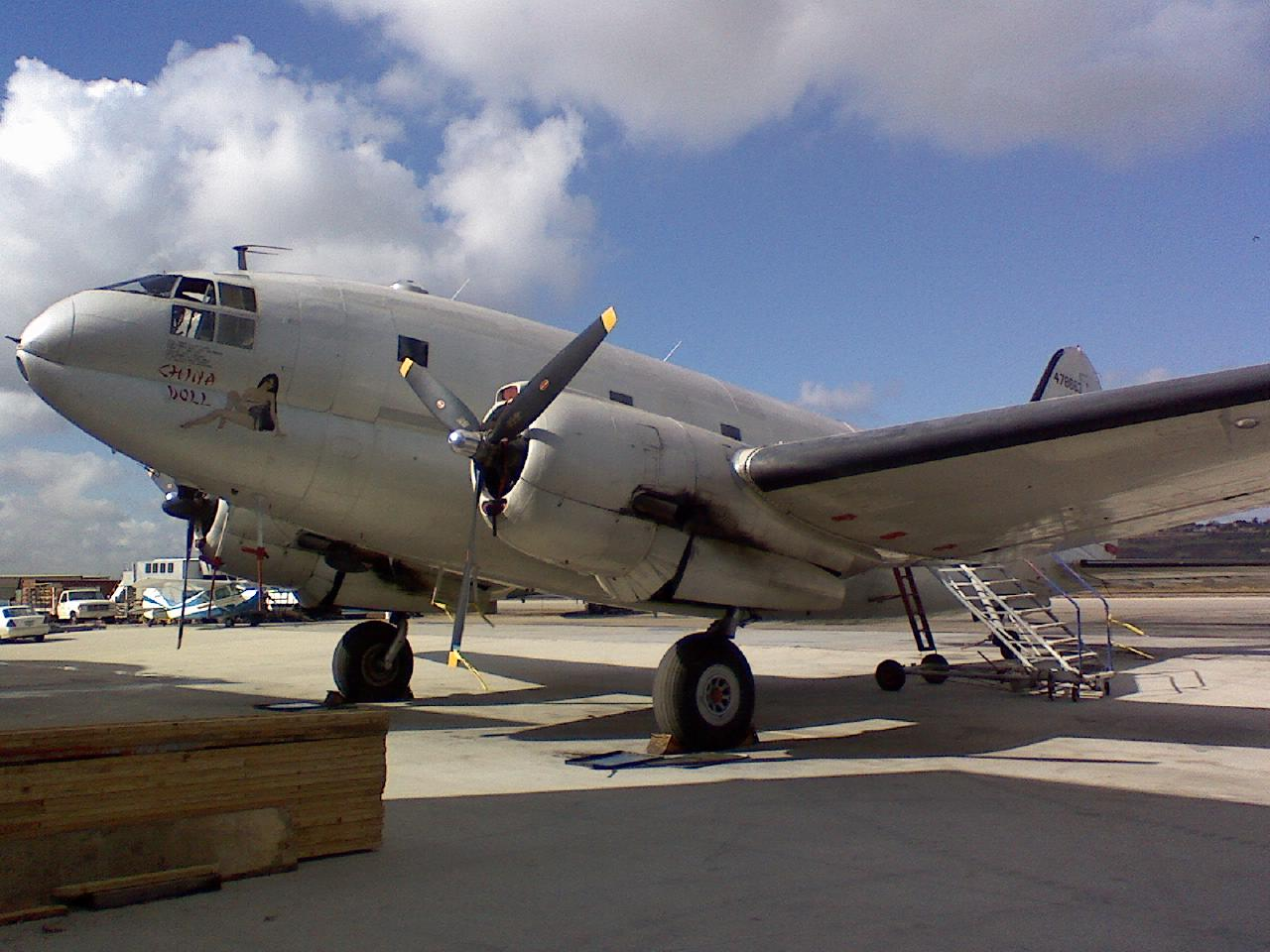
C-46F "China Doll", Camarillo Airport Museum

CW-20
Original passenger airliner design (see also CW-20T)
CW-20A
Company designation for the C-55.
CW-20B
Company designation for the C-46A.
CW-20B-1
Company designation for the XC-46B.
CW-20B-2
Company designation for the C-46D.
CW-20B-3
Company designation for the C-46E.
CW-20B-4
Company designation for the C-46F.
CW-20B-5
Company designation for the C-46G.
CW-20E
Company designation for the AC-46K.
CW-20G
Company designation for the XC-46C.
CW-20H
Company designation for the XC-46L.
CW-20T - two uses of this terminology
1. The original passenger airliner prototype, fitted with a dihedralled tailplane and endplate fins, powered by two 1,700 hp (1,300 kW) Wright R-2600 Twin Cyclone radial piston engines.
2. Mid 1950s modification package in response to CAB certification mandate (see text) offered by L.B. Smith of Miami.
C-55
Modification to the original CW-20 prototype, tail redesigned with a large single tail fin and rudder and an elevator with no dihedral and other improvements, including a change to Pratt & Whitney R-2800-5 radials. It was used as a C-46 military transport prototype aircraft, also designated XC-46. Later sold to BOAC
C-46 Commando
Twin-engined military transport aircraft, powered by two 2,000 hp (1,500 kW) Pratt & Whitney R-2800-43 radial piston engines.
C-46A Commando
Twin-engined military transport aircraft, powered by two 2,000 hp Pratt & Whitney R-2800-51 radial piston engines, fitted with a large cargo door on the port side of the fuselage, equipped with strengthened cargo floor, a hydraulic winch and folding seats for up to 40 troops.
TC-46A
Three C-46As converted to crew trainers.
XC-46A
A C-46A used for development tests; converted back to C-46 after tests were completed.

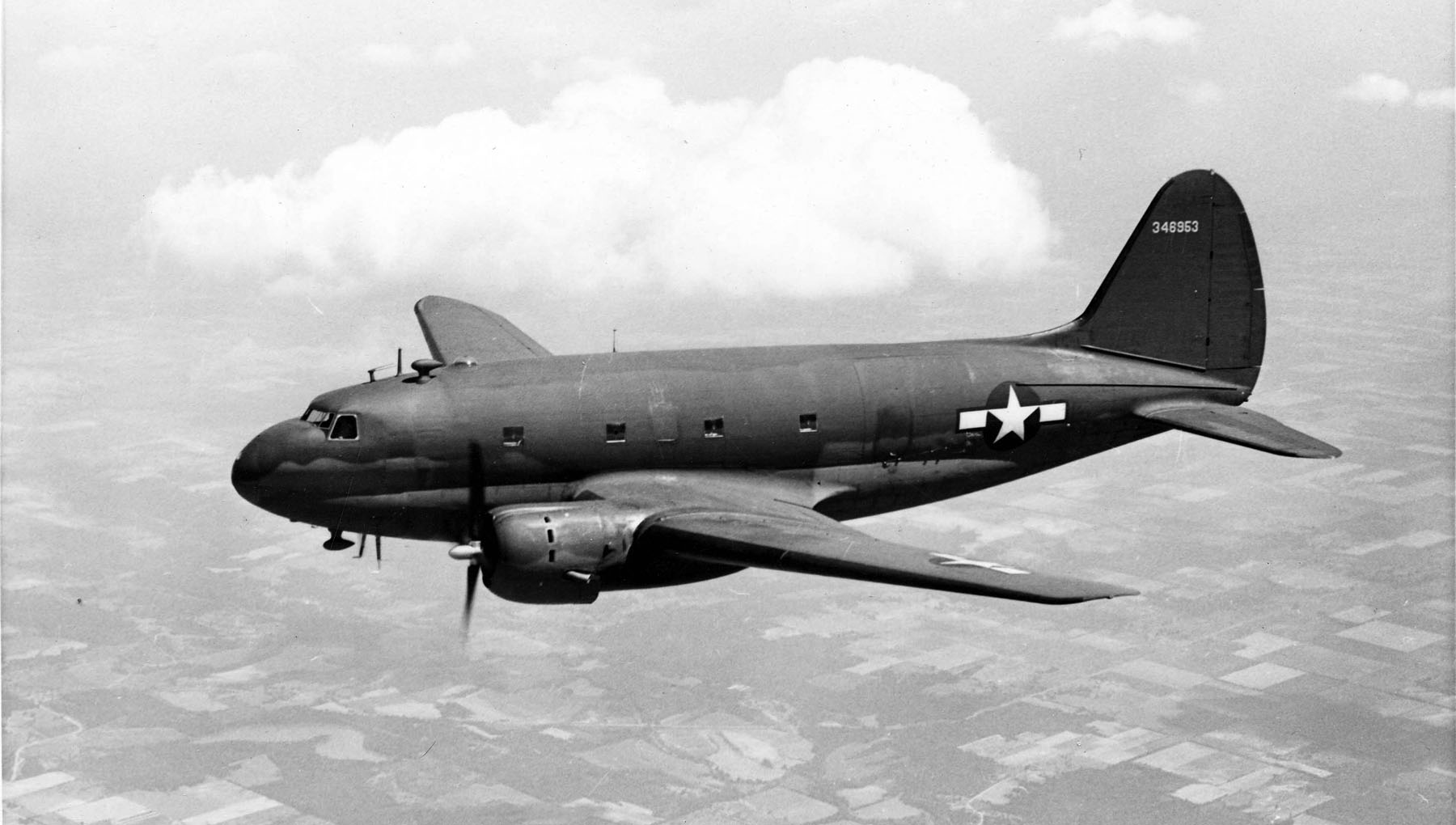
XC-46B in flight

XC-46B Commando
One C-46A was converted into a test aircraft to evaluate a stepped windscreen design, it was powered by two 2,100 hp (1,600 kW) R-2800-34W radial piston engines with water injection.
XC-46C Commando
Redesignated from C-46G, later redesignated XC-113.
C-46D Commando
Twin-engined personnel, paratroop transport aircraft, fitted with an extra door on the port side; 1,610 built.
TC-46D
15 C-46Ds converted to crew trainers.
C-46E Commando
17 C-46Ds modified with a large single cargo door on the port side of the fuselage, fitted with a stepped windscreen and 2,000 hp R-2800-75 engines with 3-bladed Hamilton Standard propellers.
ZC-46E
Redesignation of C-46Es in 1946.
C-46F Commando
Twin-engined cargo transport aircraft, equipped with single cargo doors on both sides of the fuselage, fitted with square cut wingtips; 234 built.
C-46G Commando
This one-off aircraft was fitted with a stepped windscreen and square wingtips, one built.
C-46H
More powerful version of C-46F, equipped with twin tail wheels, 300 ordered but later cancelled. One C-46A was modified to C-46H standard after WWII.
C-46J
Planned update for C-46E with stepped windscreen; never ordered.

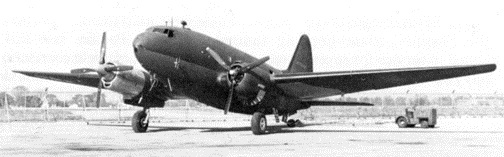
The XC-113

AC-46K Commando
Unbuilt version, intended to be powered by two 2,500 hp (1,900 kW) Wright R-3350-BD radial piston engines.
XC-46K
Conversion project for C-46F with two 2,500 hp Wright R-3350-BD engines.
XC-46L
In 1945 three C-46As were fitted with Wright R-3350 radial piston engines.

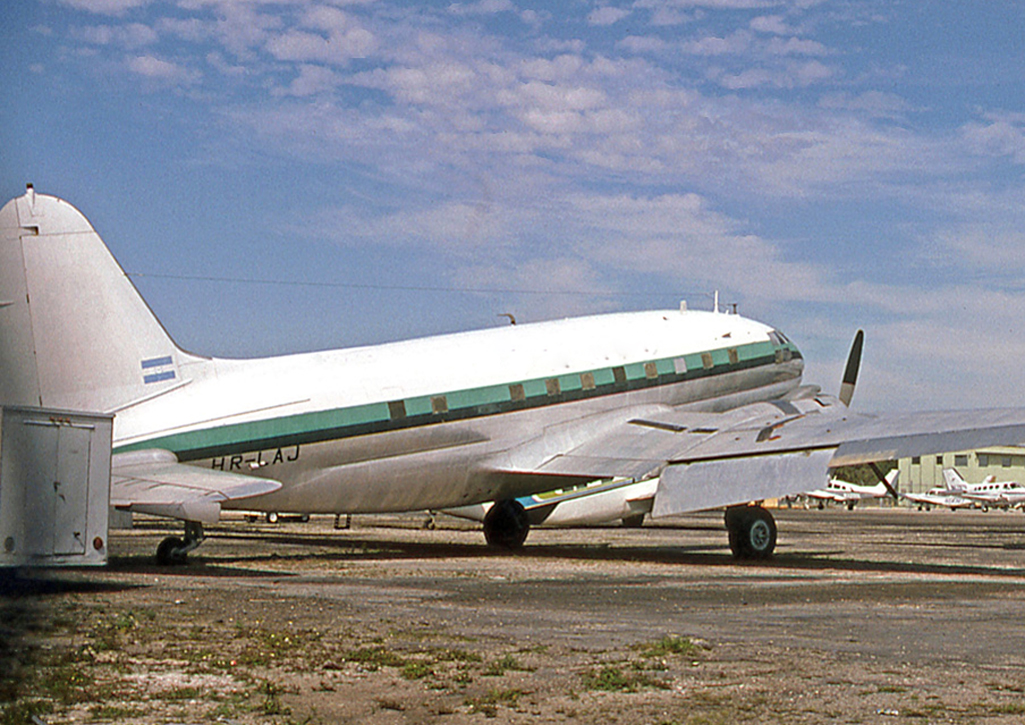
Curtiss C-46R/Super 46C post-war modified C-46D of LANSA Honduras in 1978

C-46R
Mid 1950s modification in response to CAB certification mandate (see text) offered by Riddle Airlines, which added 40 mph (64 km/h) to cruising speed and 2,200 lb (1,000 kg) to the payload.
XC-113
Engine change: One C-46G, s/n 44-78945, was converted into an engine testbed, the aircraft was fitted with a General Electric T31 turboprop in place of right-hand side R-2800. The aircraft handled so poorly on the ground that it was never flown.
R5C-1
Twin-engined military transport aircraft for the U.S. Marine Corps. Similar to the C-46A Commando; 160 built.
Super 46
Mid 1950s modification by Aircraft Engineering Foundation in response to the CAB certification mandate (see text).

== Operators ==
=== Military operators ===
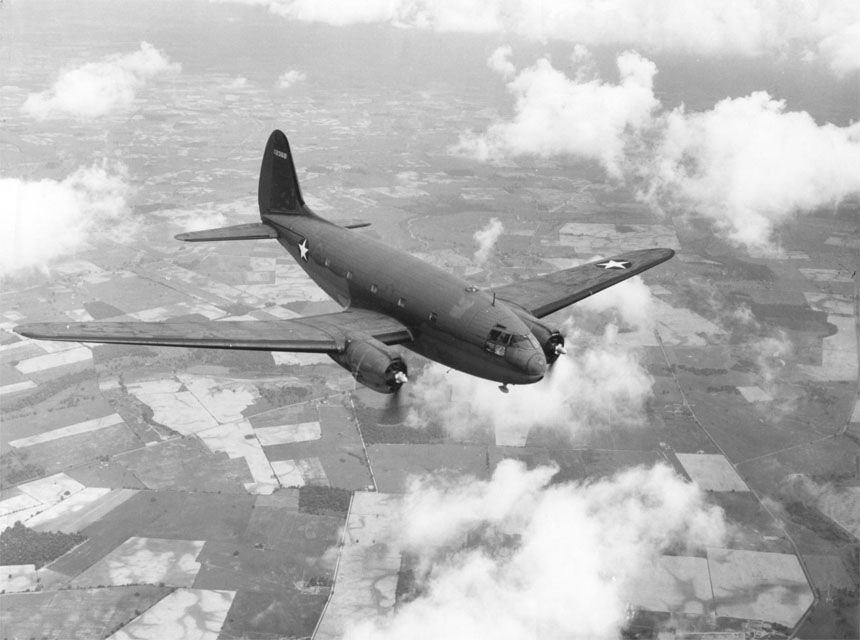
Curtiss C-46 "Commando" in flight

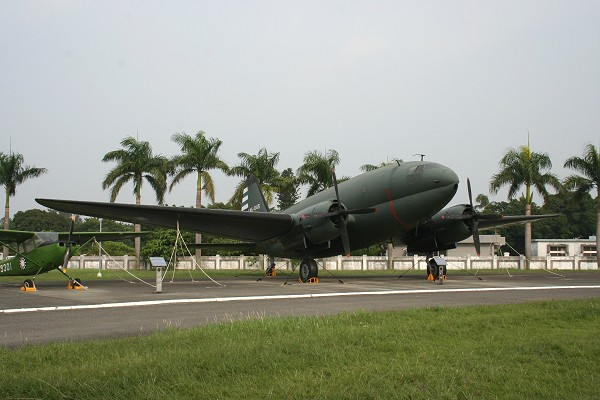
C-46 from Republic of China Air Force, at the RoCAF Museum, Taiwan

Argentina

- Argentine Air Force – two aircraft

Bolivia

- Bolivian Air Force
- Transporte Aéreo Militar

Brazil

- Brazilian Air Force

Cambodia

- Royal Khmer Aviation (AVRK) – six aircraft

Republic of China

- Republic of China Air Force

China

- People's Liberation Army Air Force

Colombia

- Colombian Air Force – one aircraft

Cuba

- Cuban Air Force

Dominican Republic

- Dominican Air Force

Ecuador

- Ecuadorian Air Force

Egypt

- Egyptian Air Force

Haiti

- Haitian Air Corps

Honduras

- Honduran Air Force

Israel

- Israeli Air Force

Japan

- Japan Air Self-Defense Force

South Korea

- South Korean Air Force

Laos

- Royal Lao Air Force

Mexico

- Mexican Air Force

Peru

- Peruvian Air Force

Soviet Union

- Soviet Air Force – one aircraft

United States

- United States Army Air Forces
- United States Air Force
- United States Marine Corps
- United States Navy
- Air America

=== Civil operators ===
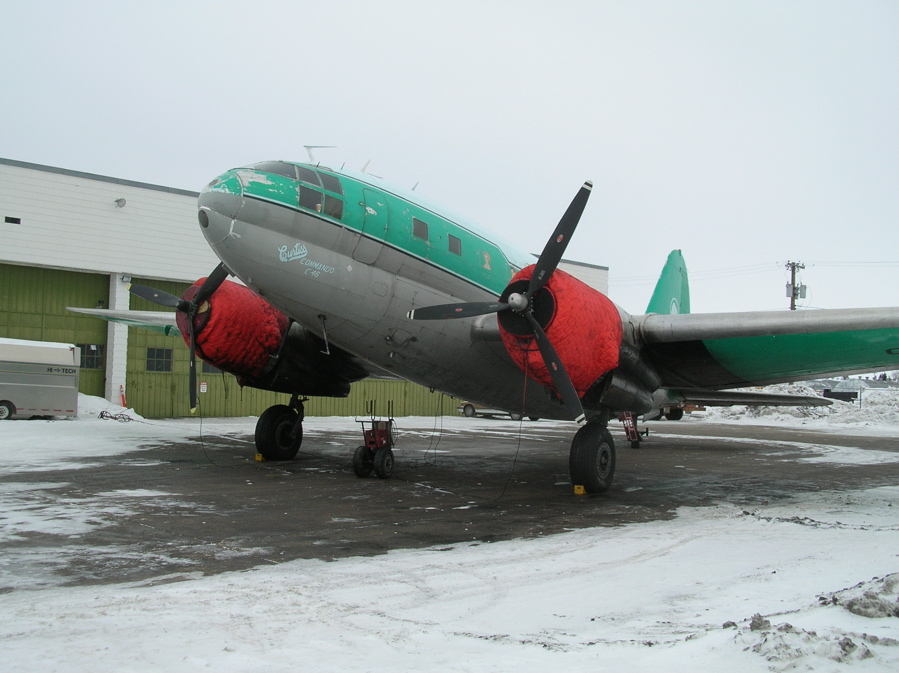
Buffalo Airways C-46 in northern Canada, c. 2005

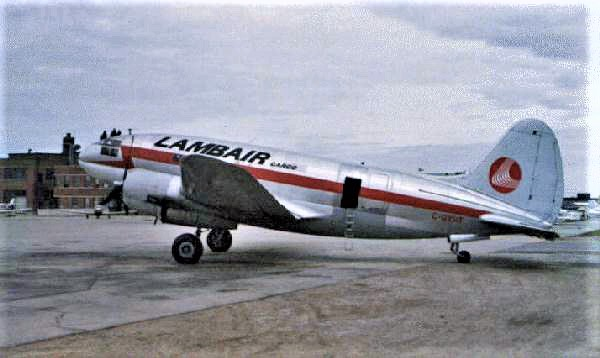
Lamb Air C-46

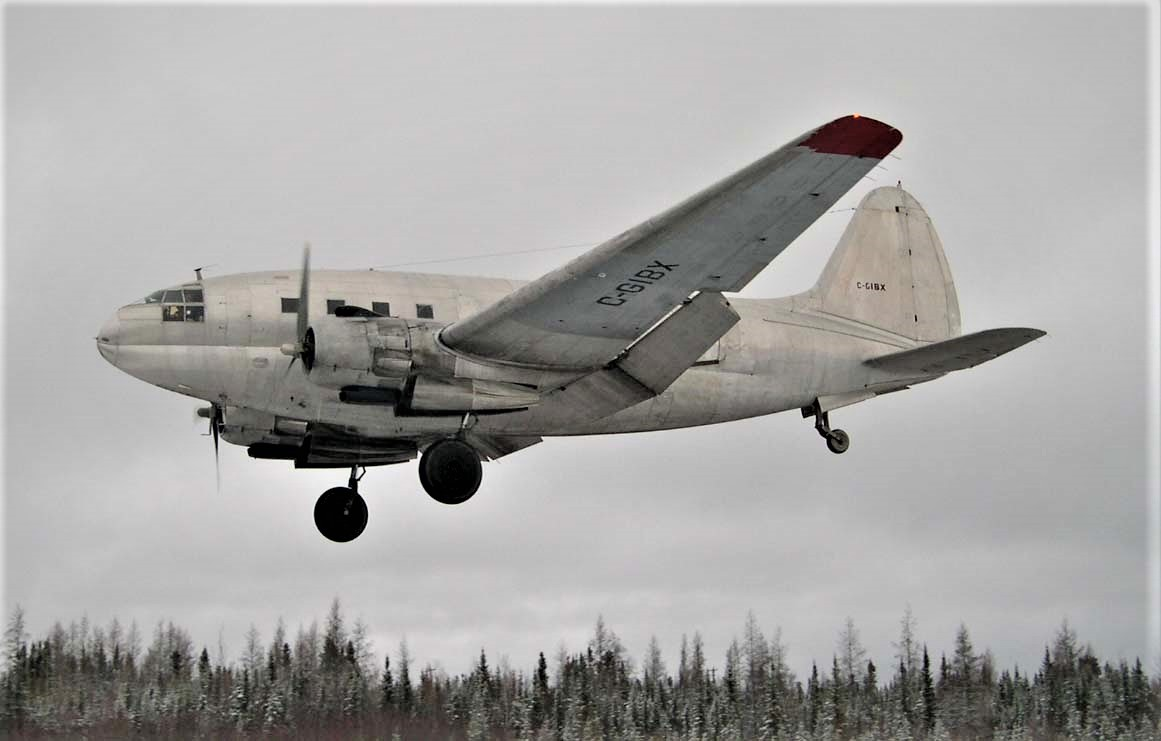
C-46 C-GIBX from First Nations Transportation, c. 2006

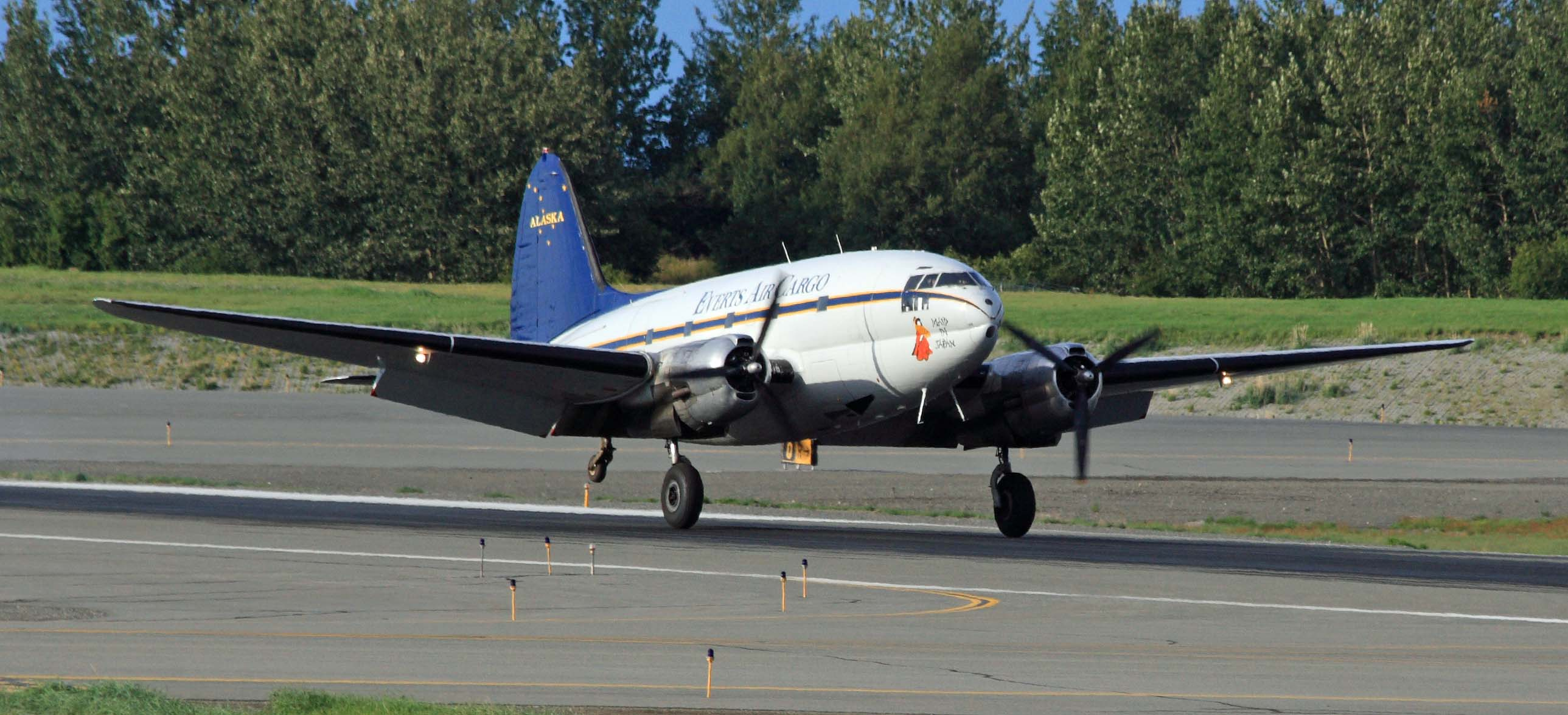
Everts Air Cargo C-46 touches down in Alaska in 2011

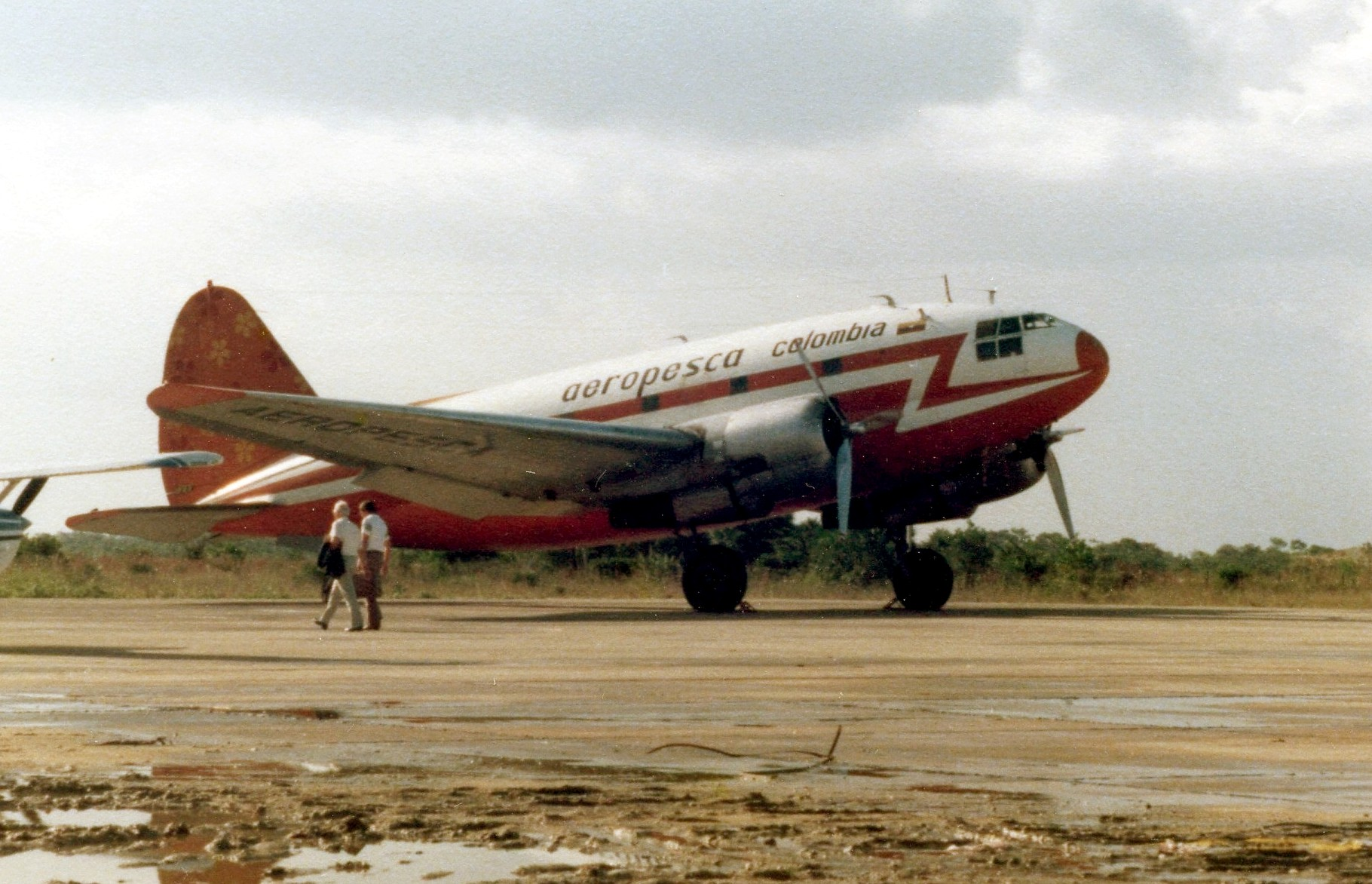
An Aeropesca Colombia C-46 at Philip S. W. Goldson International Airport, Belize

Argentina

- Aeroplan
- Aerotransportes Litoral Argentino (ALA)
- Aerovias Halcon
- Austral Lineas Aereas
- Aerolineas Carreras Transoprtes Aereos (ACTA)
- Transamerican Air Transport
- Transcontinental (TSA)

Bolivia

- Air Beni
- CAMBA Transportes Aéreos
- Frigorifico Santa Rita
- LAC Lineas Aereas Canedo
- Lloyd Aéreo Boliviano
- NEBA – North East Bolivian Airways
- SAO – Servicios Aéreos del Oriente
- SkyTeam Flight Training

Brazil

- Aero Geral
- Aeronorte
- Aerovias Brasil
- Companhia Itaú de Transportes Aéreos
- Linha Aérea Transcontinental Brasileira
- Linhas Aéreas Paulistas – LAP
- Lóide Aéreo Nacional
- NAB – Navegação Aérea Brasileira
- Paraense Transportes Aéreos
- Real Transportes Aéreos
- Sadia
- TABA
- TAS – Transportes Aéreos Salvador
- Transportes Aéreos Nacional
- Transportes Aéreos Universal
- Varig
- VASP

Canada

- Air Manitoba
- Buffalo Airways
- Canadian Pacific Air Lines
- Commando Air Transport
- Lambair
- First Nations Transportation
- Maritime Central Airways
- Pacific Western Airlines
- World-Wide Airways

Chile

- Linea Aerea Sud Americana – LASA

Colombia

- Aerocondor Colombia
- Aeropesca Colombia
- Aerosucre
- Arca
- Avianca
- CORAL Colombia
- Líneas Aéreas La Urraca

Republic of the Congo

- Congofrigo

Costa Rica

- LACSA (Líneas Aéreas Costarricenses S.A. / Costa Rica)

Cuba

- Cubana

Curacao

- Carabaische Lucht Transport

Dominican Republic

- Aeromar
- Dominicana de Aviación

Egypt

- Arabian American Airways
- SAIDE - Services Aériens Internationaux d'Egypte

Germany

- Lufthansa (leased from Capitol International Airways)

Guatemala

- Aviateca

Haiti

- Air Haiti

Honduras

- Servicicio Aereo de Honduras SA

Hong Kong

- Hong Kong Airways

Ireland

- Irish International Airlines (leased from Seaboard & Western Airlines)

Israel

- Arkia
- El Al

Italy

- Alitalia-Linee Aeree Italiane
- Società Aerea Mediterranea

Jordan

- Air Jordan

Kenya

- Relief Air Transport

Laos

- Royal Air Lao

Lebanon

- Lebanese International Airways

Luxembourg

- Luxembourg Airlines

Morocco

- Aigle Azur Maroc
- Royal Air Maroc

Nicaragua

- LANICA (Líneas Aéreas de Nicaragua S.A./ Nicaragua)

Norway

- Fred Olsen Air Transport

Panama

- Copa Airlines

Paraguay

- Paraguayan Airways Service/Servicios Aéreos del Paraguay (PAS) – 3 aircraft
- Lloyd Aéreo Paraguayo S.A. (LAPSA) – 2 aircraft
- Aerocarga Asociados (ACA) – 1 aircraft
- International Products Corporation (IPC Servicio Aéreo) – 1 aircraft

Peru

- SATCO – Servicio Aereo de Transportes Commerciales
- APSA – Aerolíneas Peruanas S.A.

Republic of China

- Central Air Transport Corporation
- China National Aviation Corporation
- Civil Air Transport – former operator
- Foshing Airlines

Sweden

- Fairline AB
- Tor-Air
- Transair Sweden

United Kingdom

- British Overseas Airways Corporation (CW-20)
- Aden Airways Flew into Asmara (then Ethiopia) Eritrea 1960s

United States

- AAXICO Airlines
- Aerovias Sud Americana (aka ASA International Airlines)
- Air America (earlier airline than the CIA operator)
- Air Services
- Air Transport Associates
- Alaska Airlines
- American Air Transport and Flight School
- Arctic-Pacific
- Argonaut Airways
- Arrow Airways
- Associated Air Transport
- Braniff (Braniff International Airways)
- California Coastal Airlines dba California Central Airlines
- Capitol Air (Capitol International Airways)
- Caribbean American Lines
- Central Airlines
- Civil Air Transport (later became Air America)
- Continental Charters
- Cordova Airlines
- Currey Air Transport
- Delta Air Lines
- Economy Airways
- Fairbanks Air Service
- Flying Tiger Line
- Flying W Airways
- Great Northern Airlines
- Interior Airways
- Intermountain Aviation
- Lake Central Airlines
- Meteor Air Transport
- Modern Air Transport
- Monarch Air Service
- National Airlines
- Near East Air Transport
- New England Air Express
- Northeast Airlines
- Northern Consolidated Airlines
- Pan American World Airways
- Peninsular Air Transport
- Quaker City Airways
- Reeve Aleutian Airways
- Resort Airlines
- Rich International Airways
- Riddle Airlines
- Rosenbalm Aviation
- Shamrock Airlines
- Saturn Airways
- Seaboard World Airlines
- Slick Airways
- Southern Air Transport
- S.S.W.
- Standard Air Lines (1945–1949)
- Strato-Freight
- Tatonduk Outfitters Limited (Parent Company of Everts Air Fuel, Everts Air Cargo and Everts Air Alaska)
- Westair Transport
- Wien Alaska Airlines
- Trans Arctic Airlines
- Trans Caribbean Airways
- Trans Continental Airlines
- Transocean Air Lines
- U.S. Aircoach
- Universal Airlines
- U. S. Airlines
- World Airways
- Zantop Air Transport

Uruguay

- ARCO Aerolíneas Colonia S.A.
- Compañía Aeronáutica Uruguaya S.A. (CAUSA)

Venezuela

- Avensa
- Linea Aeropostal Venezolana

== Accidents and incidents ==
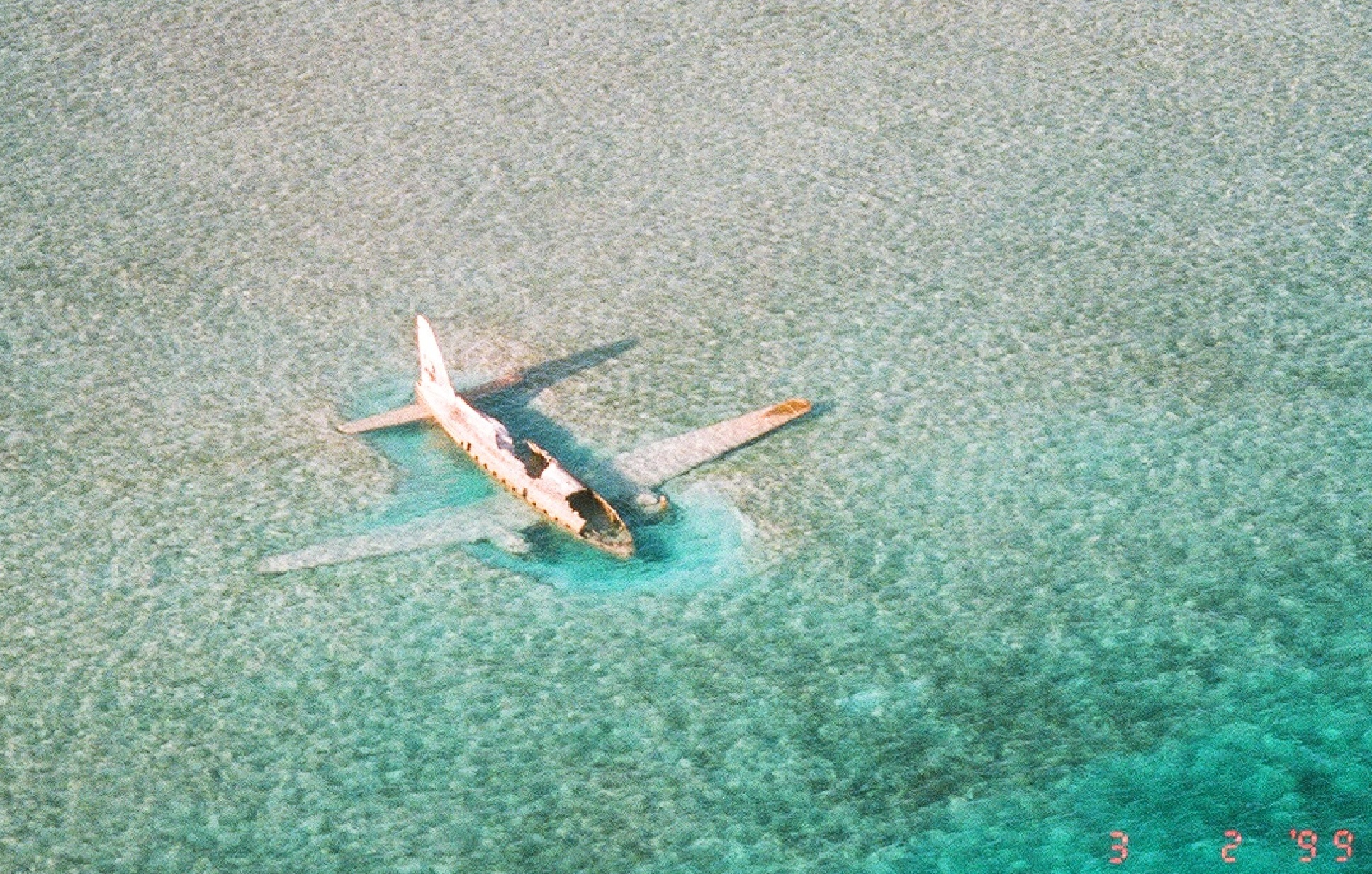
Wreckage of a Curtiss C-46 Commando that crashed in shallow water at Norman's Cay in November 1980 (1999)

== Specifications (C-46A) ==
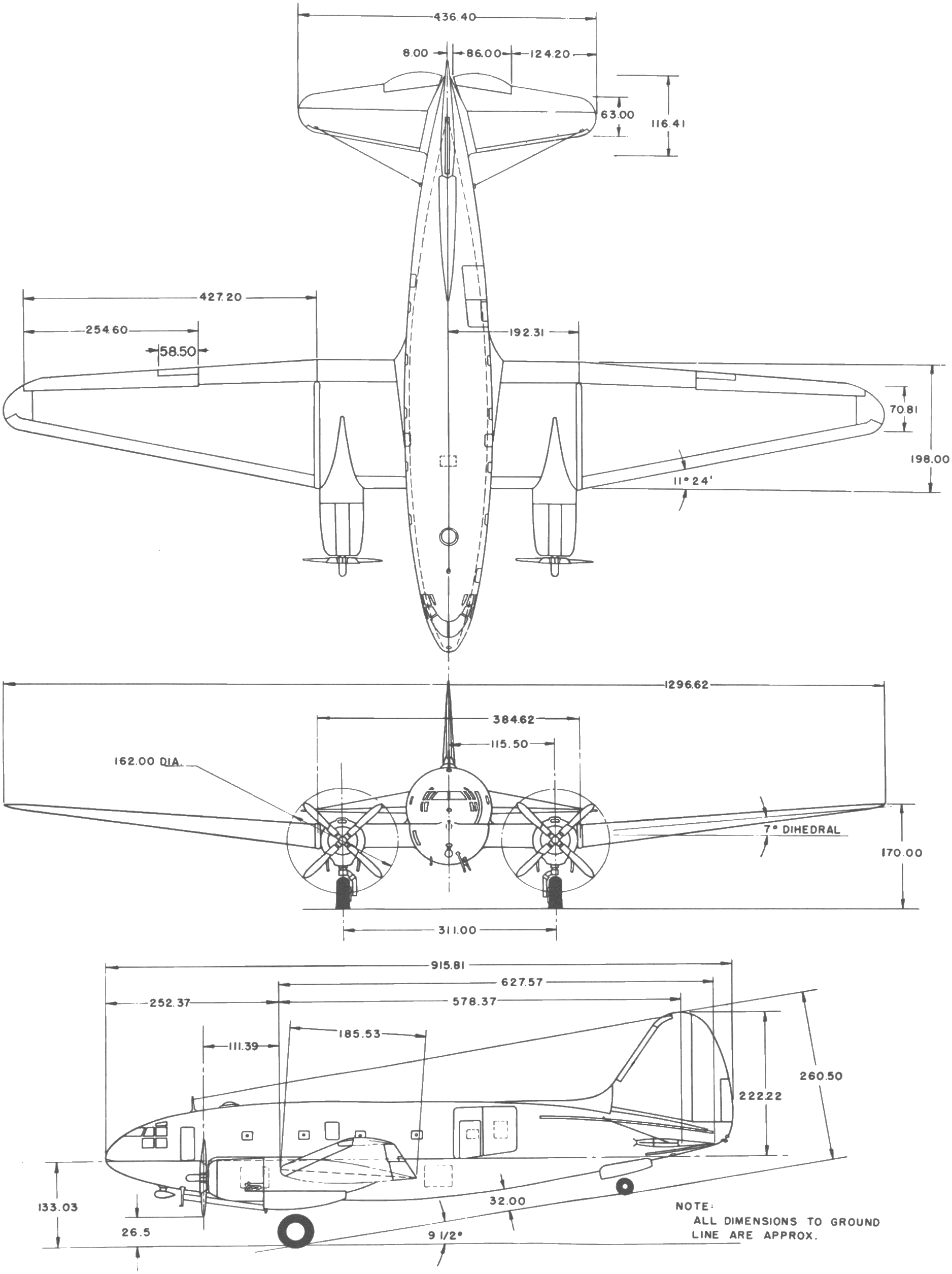
3-view line drawing of the Curtiss C-46 Commando

Data from Curtiss Aircraft 1907–1947, Air Enthusiast

General characteristics

- Crew: 4 or 5
- Capacity:
  - 40 troops or
  - 30 stretcher patients or
  - 15,000 lb (6,800 kg) cargo
- Length: 76 ft 4 in (23.27 m)
- Wingspan: 108 ft 0 in (32.92 m)
- Height: 21 ft 9 in (6.63 m)
- Wing area: 1,360 sq ft (126 m^{2})
- Airfoil: root: NACA 23017; tip: NACA 4410.5
- Empty weight: 30,669 lb (13,911 kg) (Note: Cargo configuration)
- Gross weight: 45,000 lb (20,412 kg) (Note: Normal maximum weight. Overload weight 49,600 lb (22,500 kg).)
- Powerplant: 2 × Pratt & Whitney R-2800-51 Double Wasp 18-cylinder air-cooled radial piston engines, 2,000 hp (1,500 kW) each
- Propellers: 4-bladed Curtiss Electric constant-speed propellers

Performance

- Maximum speed: 270 mph (430 km/h, 230 kn) at 15,000 ft (4,600 m)
- Cruise speed: 173 mph (278 km/h, 150 kn)
- Range: 3,150 mi (5,070 km, 2,740 nmi) at 173 mph (150 kn; 278 km/h); 1,000 mi (870 nmi; 1,600 km) at 237 mph (206 kn; 381 km/h)
- Service ceiling: 24,500 ft (7,500 m)
- Time to altitude: 10,000 ft (3,000 m) in 17 minutes 24 seconds

== See also ==
Aircraft of comparable role, configuration, and era

- Douglas C-47 Skytrain
- Boeing 307 Stratoliner

Related lists

- List of aircraft of World War II
- List of military aircraft of the United States
- List of United States Navy aircraft designations (pre-1962)
