= Bolivia during the Falklands War =

Bolivia during the Falklands War refers to all the acts that the country carried out during the time that the war in the Falklands Islands lasted. Bolivia had become in 1833 the first country in the Americas to protest the English invasion of the Falkland Islands.

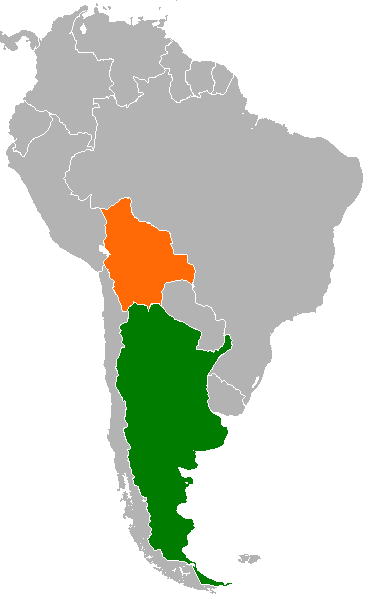
Bolivia and Argentina share a long border of 742 kilometers (461 mi) in length

== History ==
=== Background ===
Following the British occupation of the Falklands in 1833, President Andrés de Santa Cruz sent a letter of protest to King William IV in which he stated that Bolivia only recognized Argentine sovereignty over the islands. The letter was also sent to the prime minister of the United Kingdom, Charles Gray, and another copy was delivered to Buenos Aires.

==== Bolivian Government and the Falklands Islands ====
When the Falklands War broke out on 2 April 1982, Bolivia was governed by a military dictatorship under Celso Torrelio. Parts of military high command leaned toward aiding Argentina. In statements to the press, the commander of the Bolivian Air Force (FAB), Natalio Morales, said that:

"Bolivia will put fighter planes to the border in support of Argentina. It will also make available the fleet of Military Air Transport (TAM) aircraft as well as the airport infrastructure and, if necessary, refueling for Argentine aircraft. Just as Peru is already cooperating militarily, we have also decided to do so. Our support is not only moral but will also be material”

— General Natalio Morales Mosquera, commander of the Bolivian Air Force (La Paz, Bolivia, April 13, 1982)

Morales's statements were questioned by the British Embassy in La Paz, which asked Torrelio to confirm whether Bolivia had started hostilities against the UK. The British government privately warned the regime that it would apply harsh economic sanctions on Bolivia, especially in the mining industry, if the country entered the war in support of Argentina. Mining was the pillar of the Bolivian economy at the time.

In order to avoid a possible trade embargo, Foreign Minister Gonzalo Romero Álvarez recommended that Bolivia neither intervene nor object to the war, but rather adopt a policy of neutrality.

"The problems between Argentina and Great Britain must be resolved through diplomatic channels, also clarifying that at no time has the Bolivian government contemplated carrying out military-type actions”

— Foreign Minister of Bolivia Gonzalo Romero Álvarez García (La Paz, Bolivia, April 15, 1982)

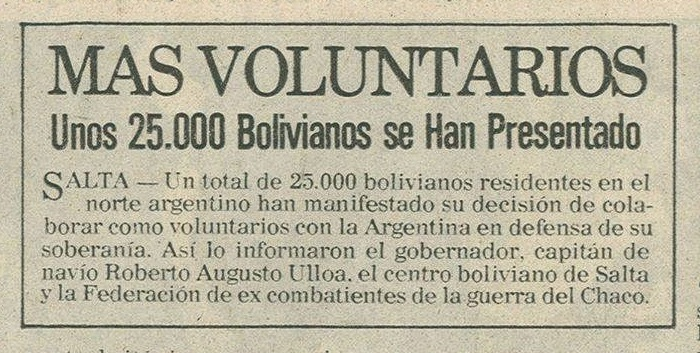
Clipping of a headline in Buenos Aires newspaper La Razón reporting on Bolivian volunteers

==== Bolivian volunteers ====
Though the Bolivian government adopted a neutral position in the face of the conflict, the public largely supported Argentina. On 26 May, the governor of the Salta Province, Roberto Augusto Ulloa, together with the Bolivian Center of Salta and the Federation of Bolivian Ex-combatants of the Chaco War, announced that there were at least 25,000 Bolivian citizens willing to fight as volunteers.

The Rattenbach Report indicates that some Bolivian nationals, as well as many Argentine conscripts descended from Bolivian parents, were sent to the battlefront. The exact number of Bolivians who participated in the war is unknown. Journalist and writer Daniel Kon states that many Argentine soldiers of Bolivian origin were mistreated and discriminated against because of their physical features.

=== Air space ===
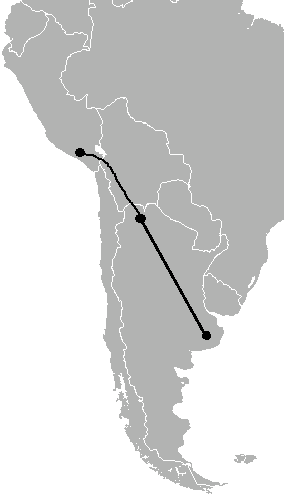
During the Falklands War, Bolivia opened its airspace for Peruvian planes to fly to Argentina

In June, Peru began to collaborate militarily with Argentina by secretly sending it some 10 French-made Dassault Mirage III fighter planes belonging to the Peruvian Air Force (FAP). Although Bolivia did not send armaments of its own, the government did open Bolivian airspace for the Peruvian planes to be transported to Argentina through its territory.

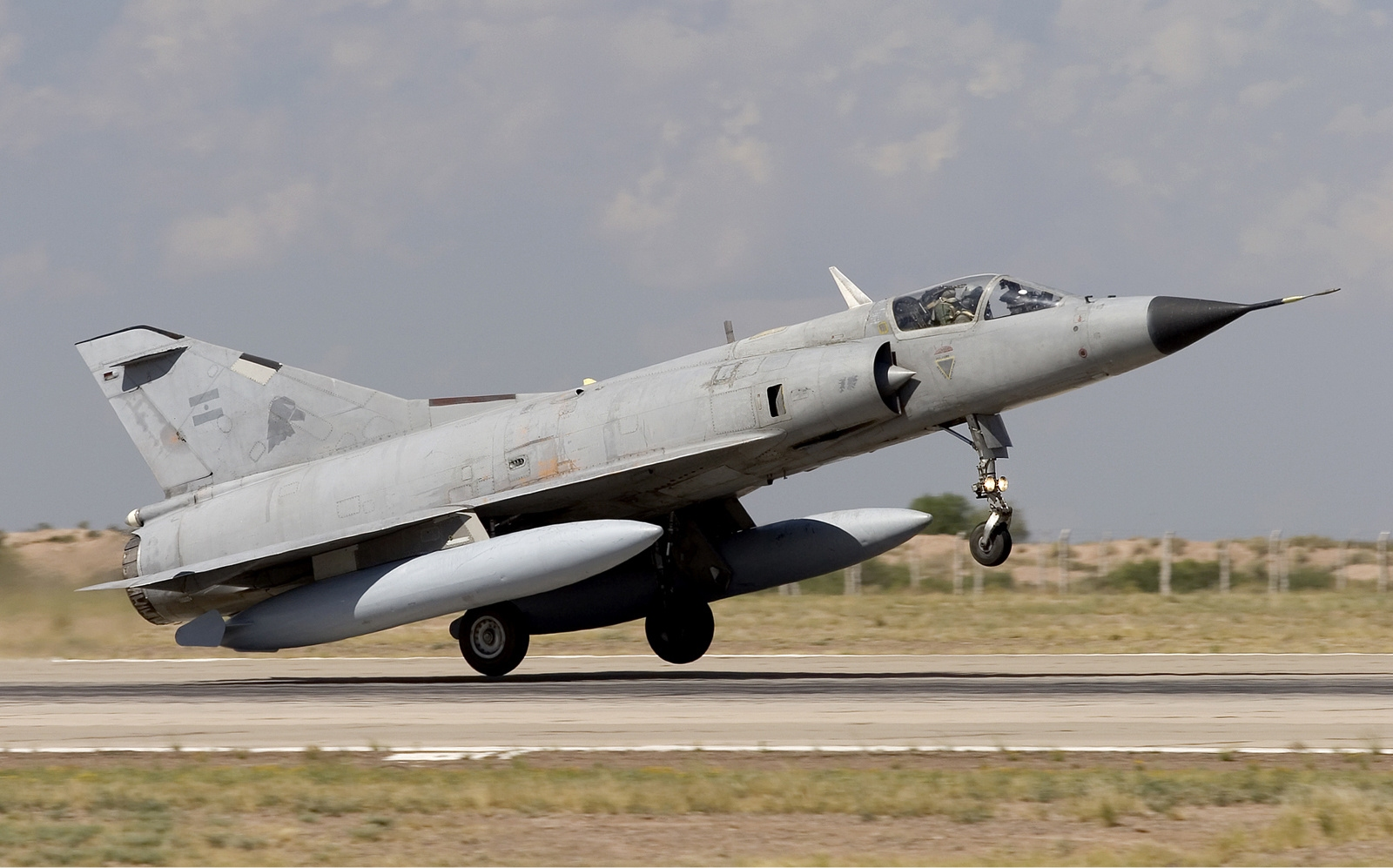
Takeoff of a French-made Dassault Mirage III fighter plane belonging to the Argentine Air Force (FAA).

The planes took off from the La Joya air base in Arequipa and flew through Bolivia to Jujuy in Argentina, finally arriving at Tandil.
