= Argentina–Bolivia relations =

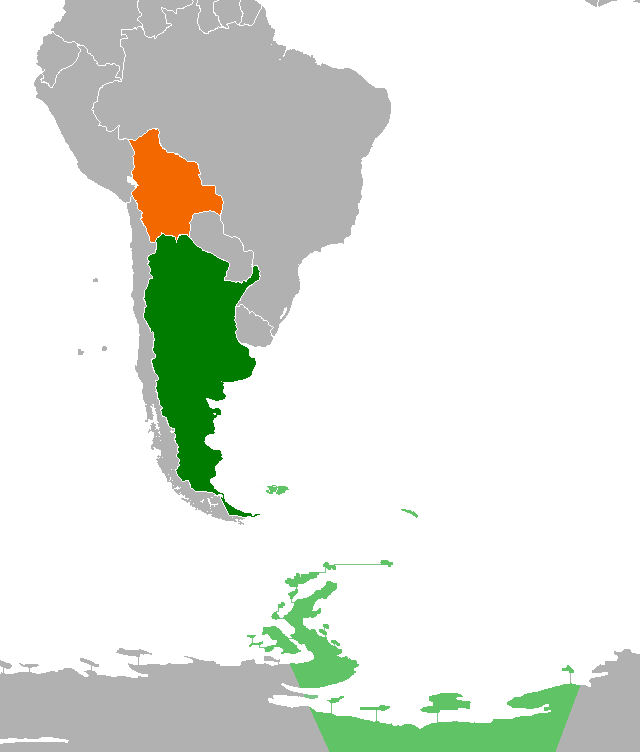
- Argentina: Bolivia

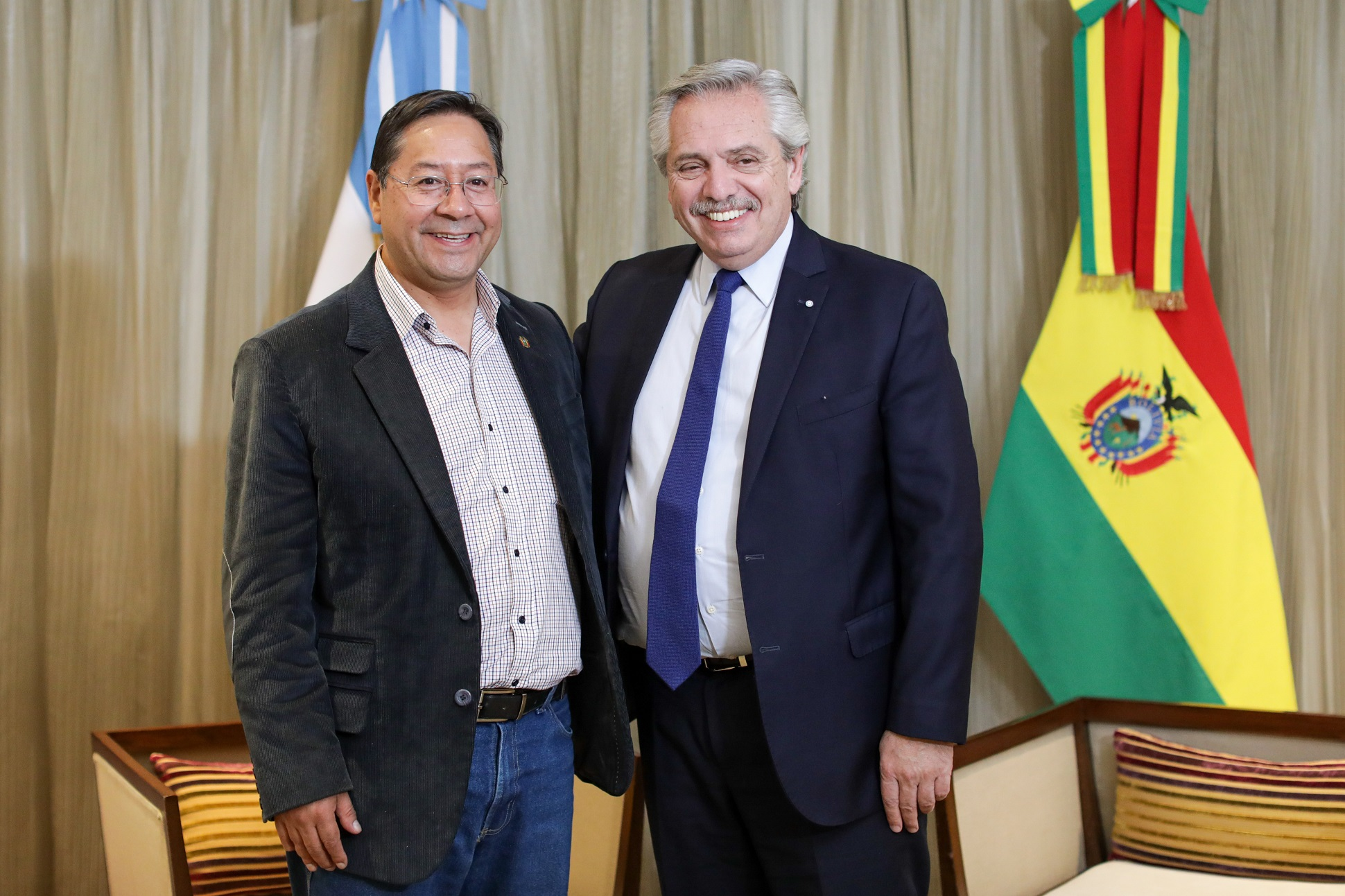
Bolivian President Luis Arce with Argentine President Alberto Fernández in 2022.

Argentina-Bolivia relations are the diplomatic and historical ties between the Argentine Republic and Plurinational State of Bolivia, relations have existed for over a century. Both countries were part of the Spanish Empire, and share an international border. Both nations are members of the Community of Latin American and Caribbean States, Latin American Integration Association, Organization of American States, Organization of Ibero-American States and the United Nations.

== History ==
Initially, both modern states of Argentina and Bolivia were part of the Viceroyalty of the Río de la Plata. Buenos Aires was by then the Capital city, and Bolivia was known as the Upper Peru. Buenos Aires ousted the viceroy in 1810, during the May Revolution, one of the starting points of the Spanish American wars of independence. The Upper Peru was heavily disputed during this war, and Buenos Aires sent three ill-fated military campaigns to secure the zone. The royalists in the Upper Peru would be ultimately defeated by Sucre, who came from the North.

The expansionist incursions of Andrés de Santa Cruz, head of the Peru-Bolivian Confederation, led both countries to war. However, the war was mainly between the Confederation and Chile. Argentina faced instead the French blockade of the Río de la Plata, imposed by France to support Santa Cruz.

In 2024, Bolivia recalled its ambassador to Argentina after President Javier Milei declared an alleged coup attempt against his Bolivian counterpart Luis Arce was "fraudulent." However, the relations between the countries have improved back to normal after 2025 Bolivian general election. In November 2025, President Javier Milei attended the inauguration of Bolivia's new president, Rodrigo Paz.

== Trade and investment ==
In 2016, Argentine exports to Bolivia amounted to US$559.7 million and Bolivian exports to Argentina amounted to US$708.7 million.

== Resident diplomatic missions ==
of Argentina in Bolivia

- La Paz (Embassy)
- Santa Cruz de la Sierra (Consulate-General)
- Tarija (Consulate-General)
- Cochabamba (Consulate)
- Villazón (Consulate)
- Yacuiba (Consulate)

of Bolivia in Argentina

- Buenos Aires (Embassy)
- Córdoba (Consulate)
- Jujuy (Consulate)
- La Quiaca (Consulate)
- Mendoza (Consulate)
- Orán (Consulate)
- Pocito (Consulate)
- Rosario (Consulate)
- Salta (Consulate)
- Viedma (Consulate)

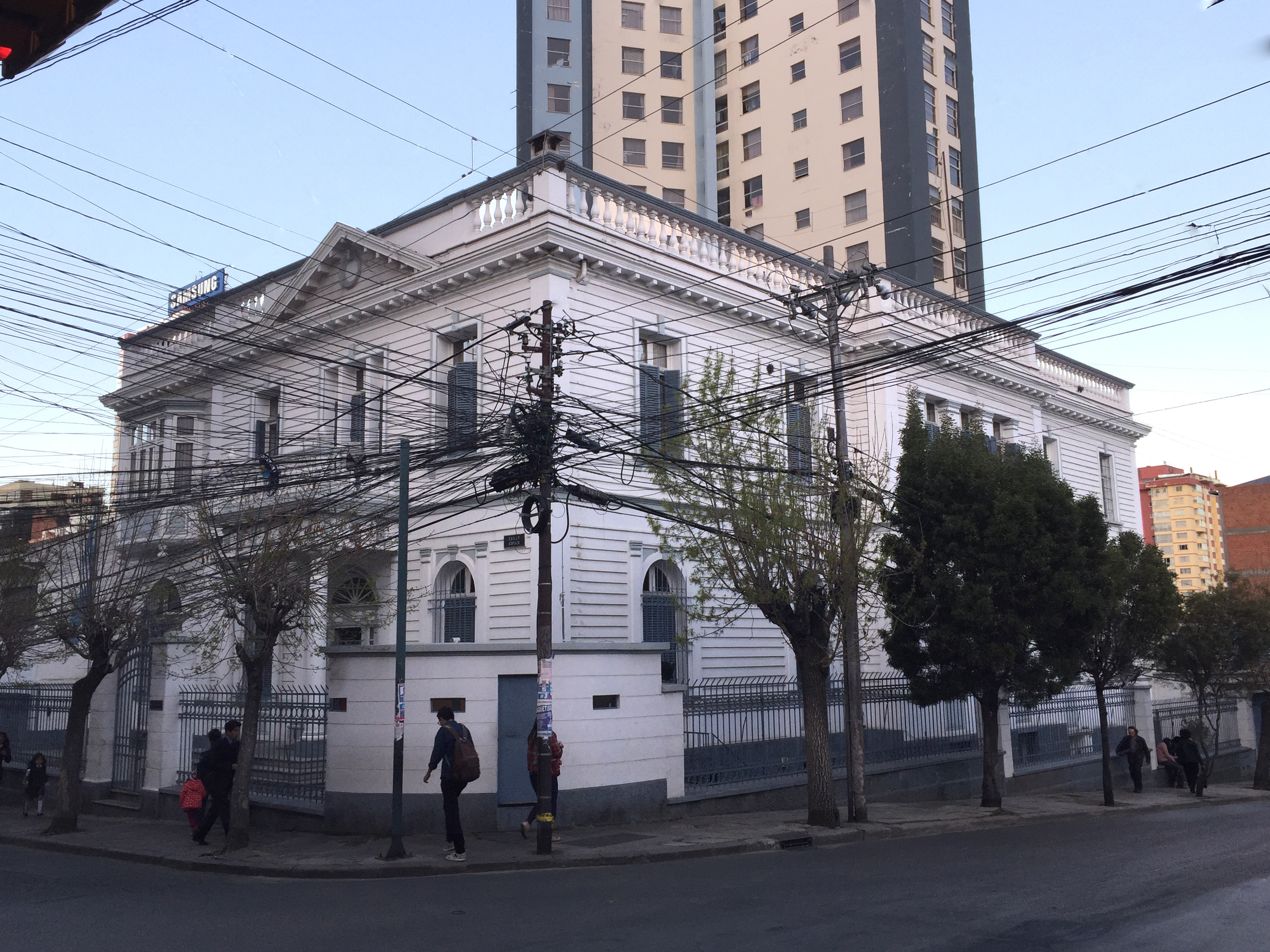
Embassy of Argentina in La Paz

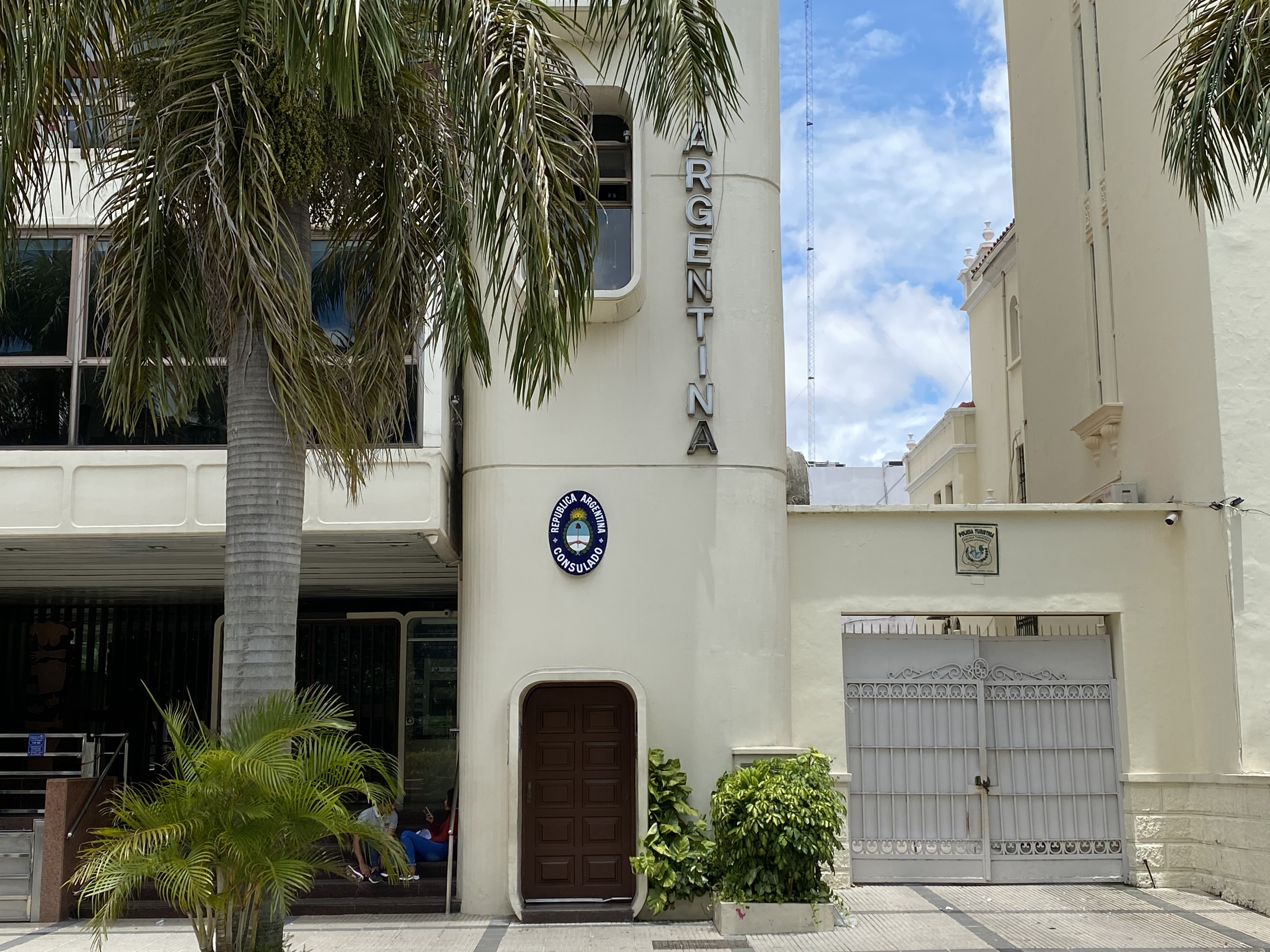
Consulate-General of Argentina in Santa Cruz de la Sierra

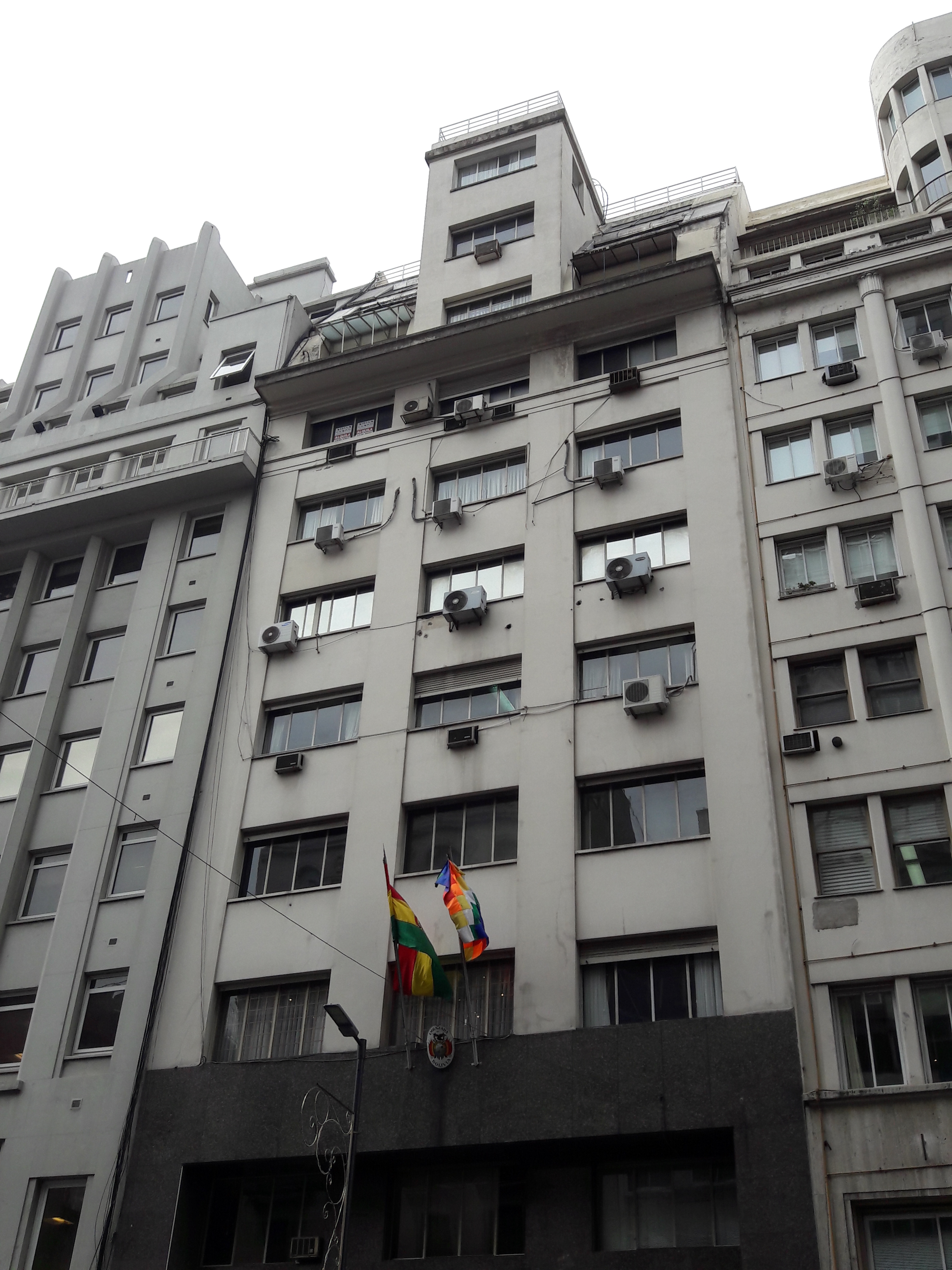
Embassy of Bolivia in Buenos Aires

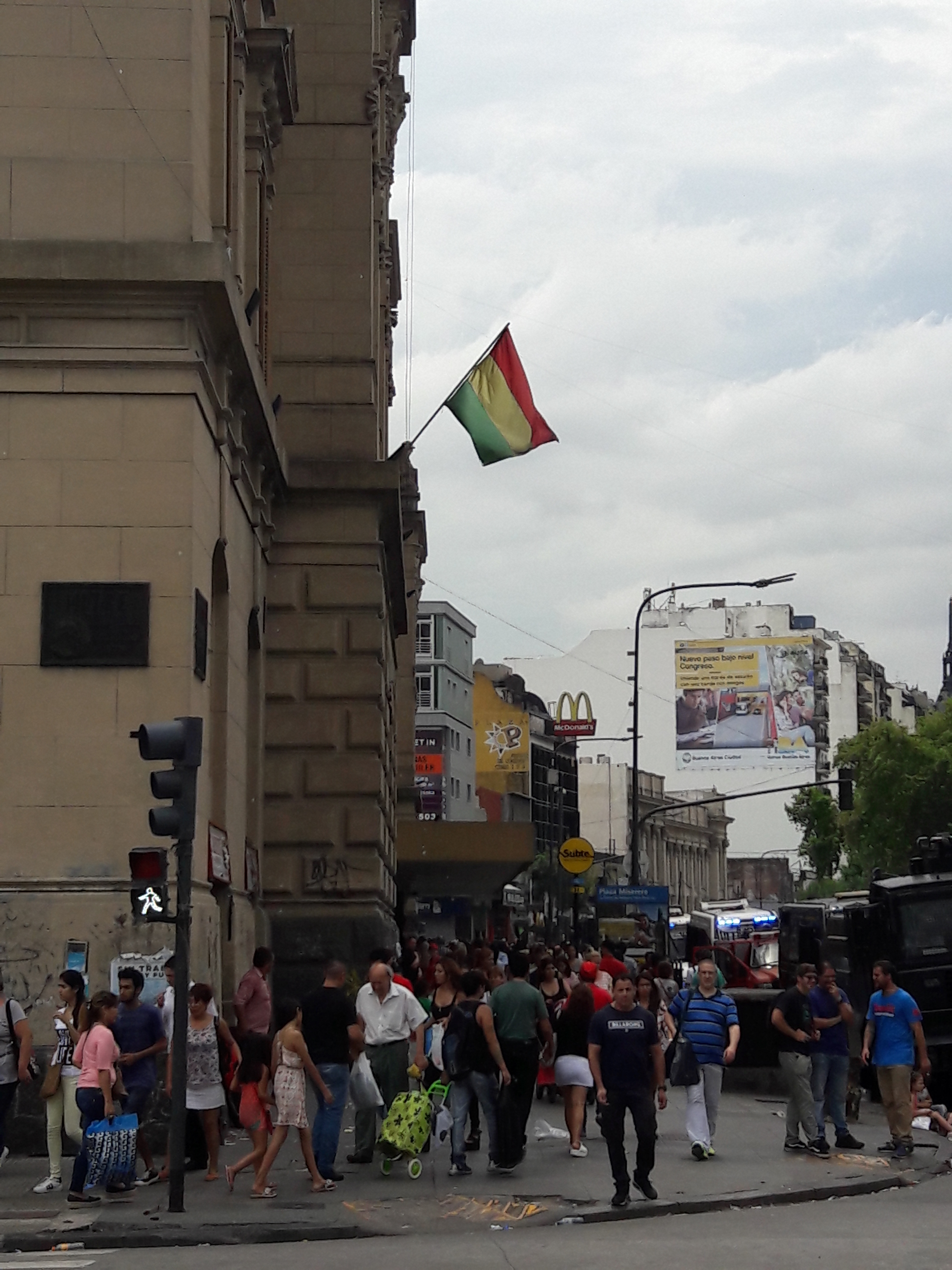
Consulate-General of Bolivia in Buenos Aires

== See also ==
- Bolivia during the Falklands War
- Bolivian Argentines
- 2019 Bolivian political crisis
