= Amalia Villa de la Tapia =

Bolivian aviator

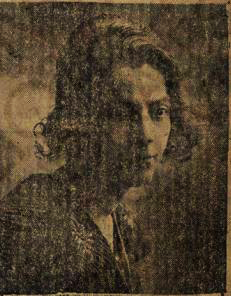
Tapia's aviator license, published in 1922

Amalia Villa de la Tapia (22 June 1893 – 1994) was a Bolivian aviator. She was the first Bolivian woman to obtain her pilot's license.

== Biography ==
De la Tapia was born in Potosí, Bolivia, the second of five siblings. After completing high school she moved to Tacna, Peru, and then to Lima. There she studied education and graduated as a primary school teacher in 1916. In 1921 she started flying lessons at the Escuela Civil de Bellavista (Civil Aviation School of Bellavista). In March 1922, de la Tapia qualified for her pilot's license at a test held at the school.

Shortly afterwards, de la Tapia returned to Bolivia and assisted in the establishment of a school of aviation in the country, which opened in 1923. In the early 1930s, de la Tapia went to France and qualified as a pilot at the Caudron school. She attempted to enlist to fly in the Chaco War to defend her country, but women were not permitted in the armed forces. In 1958, when the Bolivian Air Force was officially incorporated, de la Tapia was given the rank of captain, and later lieutenant colonel.

Her artifacts collection of artifacts would eventually form the foundation of the Bolivian Air Force Museum.
