= 1975 Transporte Aéreo Militar Convair CV-440 crash =

Aircraft accident in Bolivia

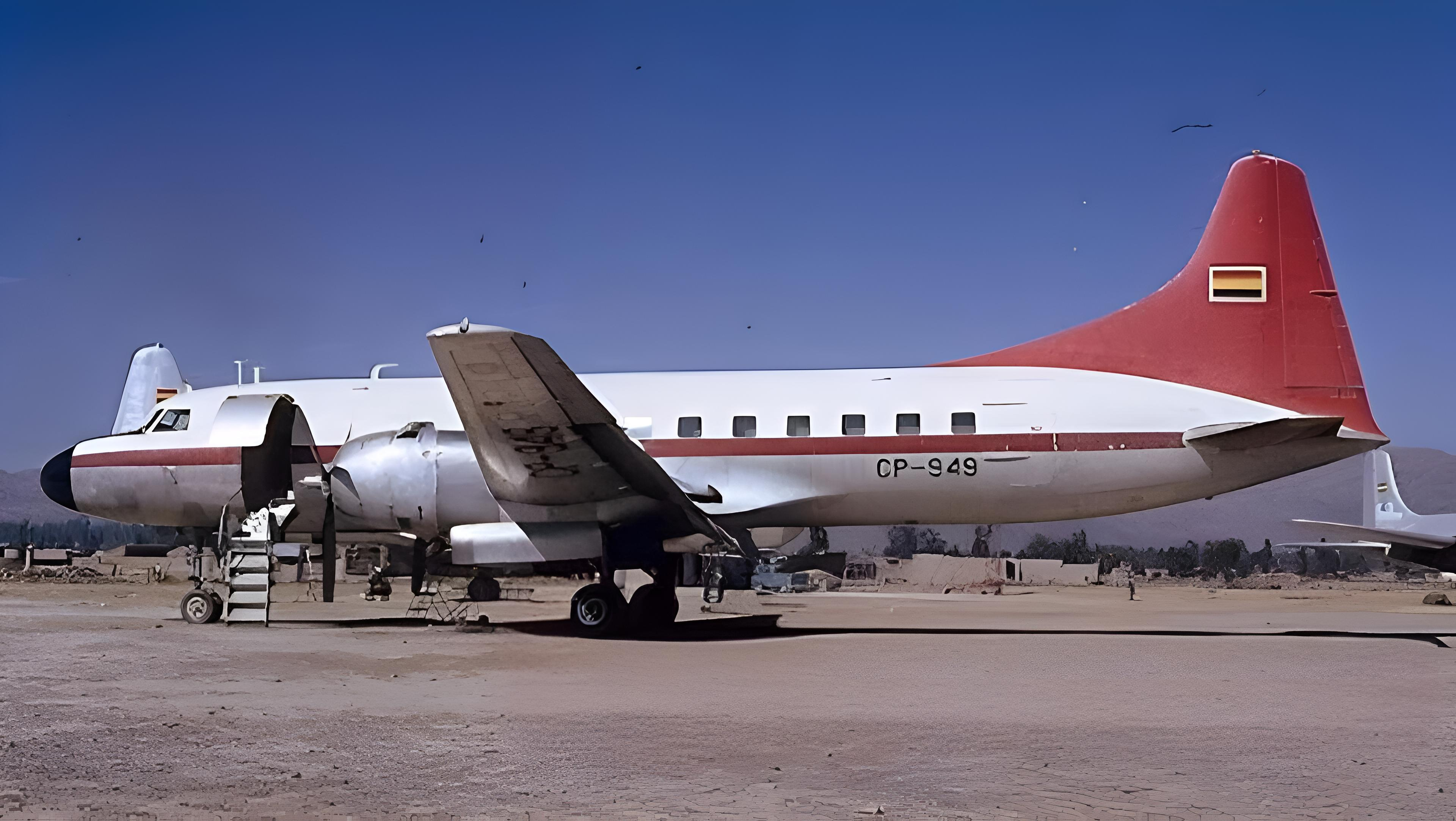
- A Convair CV-440-12, similar to the one involved in the accident

Accident
- Date: 27 October 1975
- Summary: Likely insufficient altitude due to overloading
- Site: Caranavi, Bolivia

Aircraft
- Aircraft type: Convair CV-440-12
- Operator: Transporte Aéreo Militar (TAM)
- Flight origin: Tomonoco, Bolivia
- Destination: El Alto Airport, La Paz, Bolivia
- Occupants: 67
- Passengers: 63
- Crew: 4
- Fatalities: 67
- Survivors: 0

On 27 October 1975 a Convair CV-440-12 operated by Transporte Aéreo Militar (TAM) was on a domestic flight from Tomonoco to El Alto Airport, La Paz, Bolivia. At approximately 11:00 the aircraft crashed in the vicinity of Caranavi. All 67 people aboard died in the crash. The crash is believed to have been caused by overloading. It is the deadliest crash involving the Convair CV-240 family of aircraft.

== Accident ==
The Convair CV-440-12 departed from an airstrip at Tomonoco, 170 kilometres north-east from La Paz. With destination El Alto Airport, La Paz that is located at 12,000 feet above sea level, being the highest large city worldwide.

Ten minutes after take-off, at around 10:50, the pilot made an emergency call. The pilot was indicating a loss of power or insufficient power on climb-out. The aircraft crashed in rugged semi-mountainous terrain against a steep mountainside in a section of the Andes noted for its deep chasms and snowcapped peaks. The outer wings sheared off upon initial impact with trees, with the fuselage continuing on to impact on a sloping hillside. The impact was followed by an intense fire, killing all 67 people on board.

The crash site was heavily forested and difficult to access. The search for survivors was carried out by the Bolivian Air Force, with many aircraft including helicopters. The Gendarmerie and the Army also helped in the search operation. The president of Bolivia Hugo Banzer Suarez went to Tomonoco to lead the search operation.

== Victims ==
The exact number of passengers was initially unknown. The only available passenger manifest was that from four days earlier on 24 October, showing 54 passengers. This passenger list consisted primarily of Bolivian military personnel with their wives, children and other relatives. They were returning after having spent a weekend at the Bolivian Armed Forces Recreation Center at Tomonoco. The senior military passengers on the list were two Lieutenant colonels of the Ministry of Defence. Most of the other military personnel were junior officers of the Lanza Regiment of the Bolivian Army.

An initial reported stated 55 people were killed. The president of Bolivia Hugo Banzer Suarez stated that 60 people were killed. Other initial reports stated 70 people.

After the recovery and identification of remains on 27 and 28 October it was revealed that there were 63 passengers on board. After the bodies were identified, it was reported that 20 military officers and six male civilians were on board, with the others being their wives and children. It was reported by The New York Times that two nephews of the Bolivian president were also aboard.

== Aftermath ==
According to the President of Bolivia, it was the worst disaster in Bolivia's military aviation history. The Representational Officer of the United States attended military services on 28 October and extended official condolences on behalf of the ambassador and US Armed Forces to the Government of Bolivia.

Because the debris was far spread out, it was speculated that the aircraft exploded in the air. An attack was not ruled out in the newspapers, with the political situation at the time and possible political motives and consequences described.

The BAF started an investigation into the cause of the crash. A possible factor of the crash was that the aircraft was grossly overloaded. The Convair CV-440-12 used for the flight had 48 seats, but there were 67 people aboard. It is believed that safety protocols were not followed.

The investigations never progressed and an credible official report never came. The Armed Forces delivered nailed-down coffins and a collective burial took place. The State of Bolivia made a payment equivalent to $1,000 per family. The course of this aftermath has been criticized by relatives.
