= Transporte Aéreo Militar =

Bolivian airline

IATA	ICAO	Call sign
-	EPT	TAMEP
- Founded: 1945; 81 years ago (original)
- Commenced operations: June 15, 1945; 81 years ago (original); May 31, 2024; 2 years ago (as TAMep)
- Hubs: El Alto International Airport; Viru Viru International Airport
- Fleet size: 3 (as of December 2025)
- Destinations: 4 (as of December 2025)
- Parent company: Bolivian Air Force
- Headquarters: La Paz, Bolivia
- Key people: René Saravia
- Website: www.tamep.bo

TAMep (Transporte Aéreo Militar Empresa Pública) is a Bolivian military-owned regional airline based in La Paz, Bolivia. Affiliated with the Bolivian Air Force, it was created as a logistical branch for passenger transport to serve rural communities where commercial airlines could not operate profitably. In 2019, it temporarily suspended operations and became a public enterprise, resuming flights in 2024 after a restructuring process.

== History ==
=== Creation ===
The Transporte Aéreo Militar (TAM) was created in 1945 as an air transport unit of the Bolivian Air Force (FAB), with the primary mission of providing air connectivity to remote and isolated regions of Bolivia where commercial aviation services were limited or nonexistent. Its origins date back to 1944, when the Escuadrón de Transporte Aéreo (ETA) was established to support military logistics and national integration. TAM formally began operations on 15 June 1945 with Douglas C-47 aircraft, which were used for passenger transport, cargo carriage and logistical missions, playing a significant role in connecting isolated communities and strengthening state presence across the country.

=== Expansion and early commercial operations ===
In 1953, the organization adopted the name Transporte Aéreo Militar (TAM), consolidating its institutional identity within the Bolivian Air Force. During the mid-1950s, TAM expanded its scope beyond exclusively military transport and began operating regular commercial passenger services on domestic routes. Over the following decades, the airline became an important component of Bolivia's internal air transport system, serving departmental capitals and smaller cities, often in regions with limited infrastructure or low commercial demand, where private airlines were unwilling or unable to operate sustainably.

Over the decades, Transporte Aéreo Militar operated a varied fleet of aircraft reflecting its dual role as a military transport service and a provider of passenger and cargo services across Bolivia. Throughout its history, the organization flew piston and turboprop types such as the Douglas C‑47, Fokker F27 Friendship, CASA C-212 Aviocar and Convair CV‑440/580, alongside jet airliners including the Boeing 727, Boeing 737‑200, Boeing 737-300 and British Aerospace 146; many of these aircraft served both remote regional routes and higher‑capacity trunk services, illustrating the evolution of TAM's operational capabilities over time.

In 2008, Transporte Aéreo Militar integrated Xi'an MA60 aircraft into its fleet as part of a broader effort to modernize the Bolivian Air Force’s transport capabilities. The incorporation of the Chinese‑built turboprop MA60 aimed to enhance the institutional air transport service by supporting passenger and cargo operations across domestic routes and logistical missions, contributing to greater mobility and operational efficiency for TAM.

=== Restructuring and suspension of operations ===
As part of broader reforms in the state aviation sector, the Bolivian government initiated a process to transform TAM into a civil public airline. This transformation was formalized by Supreme Decree No. 3444 of 2017, which established the restructuring of TAM as a public enterprise separate from direct military administration. The transition required significant organizational and regulatory adjustments, including compliance with civil aviation standards and oversight by national aviation authorities. During this period of institutional change, TAM suspended its regular flight operations in July 2018.

Although authorization was later granted to temporarily resume services in 2019, TAM continued to face financial, administrative and regulatory challenges, including outstanding tax obligations and difficulties in obtaining full operational certification. As a result, all flight operations were again suspended on 23 September 2019, initiating a prolonged period of inactivity while the government assessed alternatives for the airline's future and potential restructuring.

=== Present years ===
After several years without commercial activity, the airline was reestablished as Transporte Aéreos Militares – Empresa Pública (TAMep) and officially resumed operations on 31 May 2024. The relaunch marked a rebranding from TAM to TAMep and was carried out with a limited operational structure. At the time, the airline operated a single aircraft, an Avro RJ70 registered CP-3106, which served initial domestic routes connecting La Paz with Santa Cruz de la Sierra, Cochabamba and Cobija. Government authorities stated that administrative and technical procedures were underway to allow for a gradual expansion of services to additional destinations within Bolivia.

In October 2025, TAMep temporarily suspended operations due to scheduled maintenance on its only operational aircraft, underscoring the operational constraints associated with a single-aircraft fleet. The airline indicated that services would resume following the completion of the maintenance work, characterizing the interruption as temporary rather than structural.

Later that year, amid broader challenges in Bolivia's aviation sector and increased passenger demand during the year-end holiday season, the government announced solidarity flights to mitigate disruptions affecting domestic air services. These flights were to be operated by the Bolivian Air Force, which made two aircraft available to the airline: a British Aerospace 146 and a Boeing 737-200, reflecting the continued role of state and military resources in supporting civil aviation during periods of operational strain.

== Destinations ==
As of December 2025, TAMep operates flights to the following destinations:

Base
Future
Focus city
Terminated

TAMep Destinations
Department	City	Airport	Notes
Beni
Beni	Guayaramerín	Capitán Av. Emilio Beltrán Airport	Suspended
Beni	Riberalta	Capitán Av. Selin Zeitun Lopez Airport	
Beni	Rurrenabaque	Rurrenabaque Airport	
Beni	Trinidad	Teniente Jorge Henrich Arauz Airport	Suspended
Chuquisaca
Chuquisaca	Sucre	Alcantarí International Airport	Suspended
Cochabamba
Cochabamba	Cochabamba	Jorge Wilstermann International Airport	
La Paz
La Paz	La Paz	El Alto International Airport	Hub
Pando
Pando	Cobija	Captain Aníbal Arab Airport	
Santa Cruz	Santa Cruz de la Sierra	Viru Viru International Airport	Temporarily suspended
Santa Cruz	Santa Cruz de la Sierra	El Trompillo Airport	Operating temporarily
Tarija
Tarija	Tarija	Capitán Oriel Lea Plaza Airport	Suspended

== Fleet ==
=== Current fleet ===
As of December 2025, TAMep operates the following aircraft:

TAMep Fleet
Aircraft	In service	Orders	Passengers	Note
Avro RJ70	1	—	79	Reg. CP-3106
British Aerospace 146	1	—	88	Reg. FAB-106 opby Bolivian Air Force
Boeing 737-200	1	—	125	Reg. FAB-117 opby Bolivian Air Force
TOTAL	3	—		

=== Gallery ===
TAMep Current Fleet

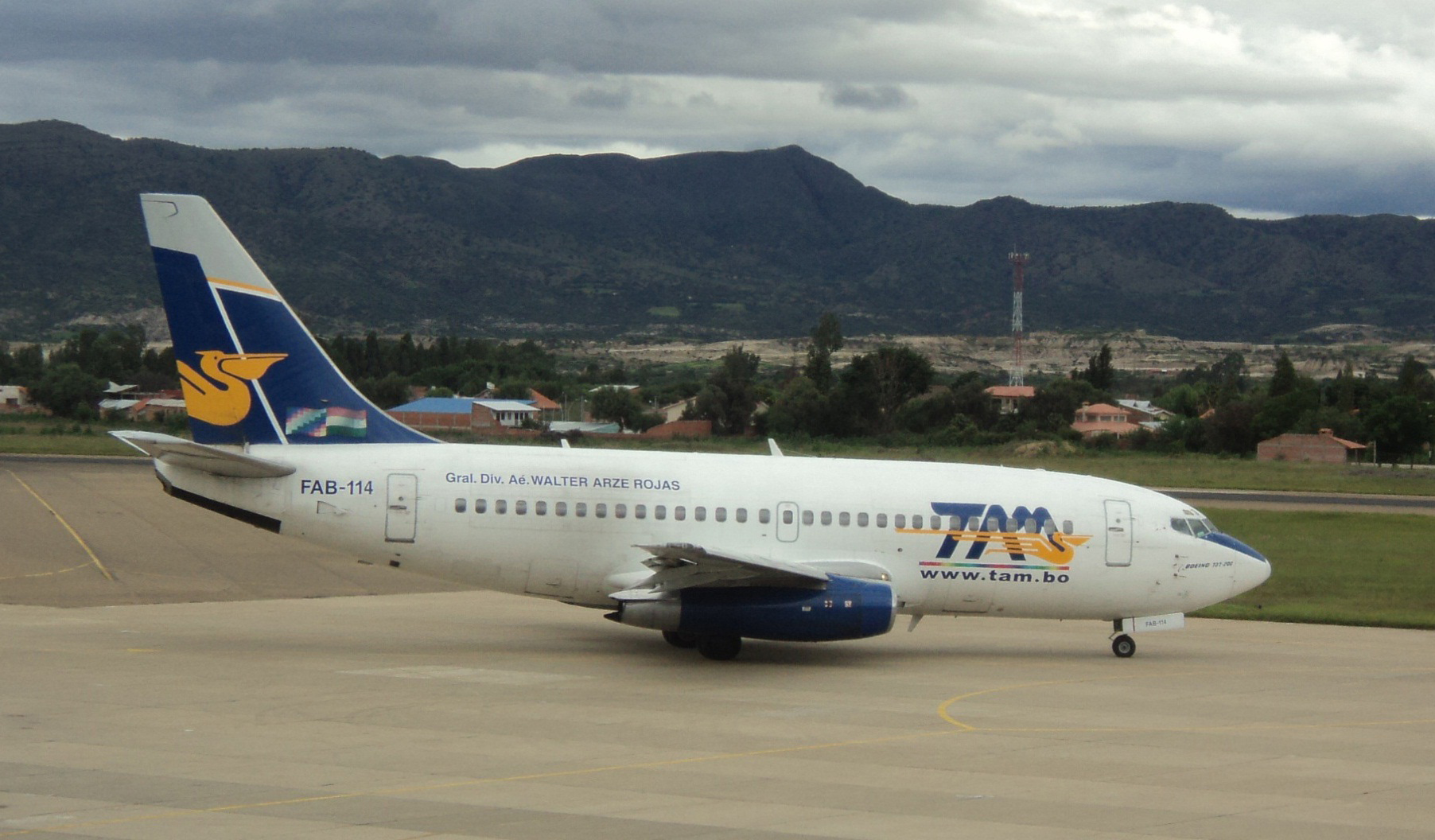
Boeing 737-200

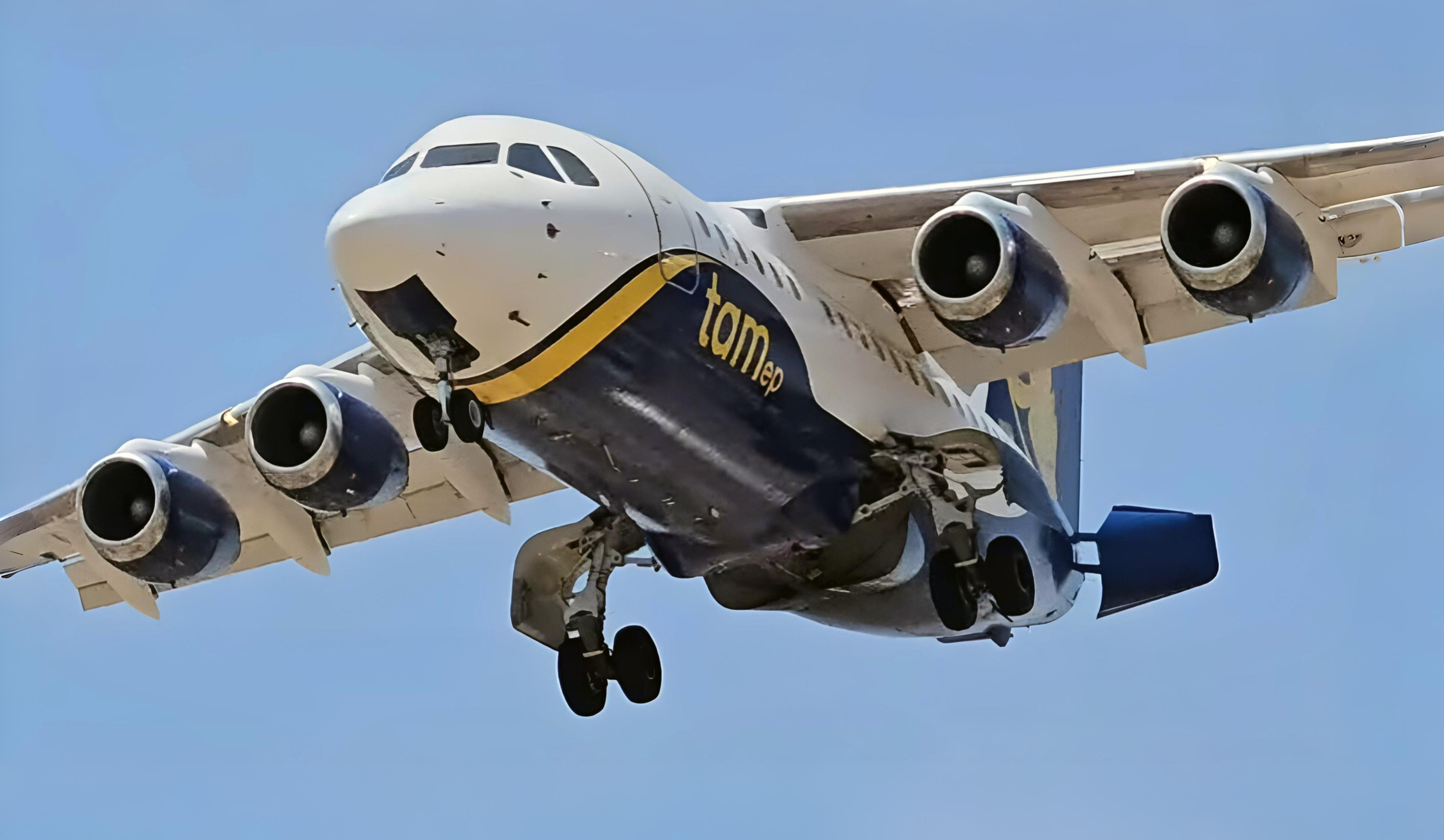
Avro RJ70

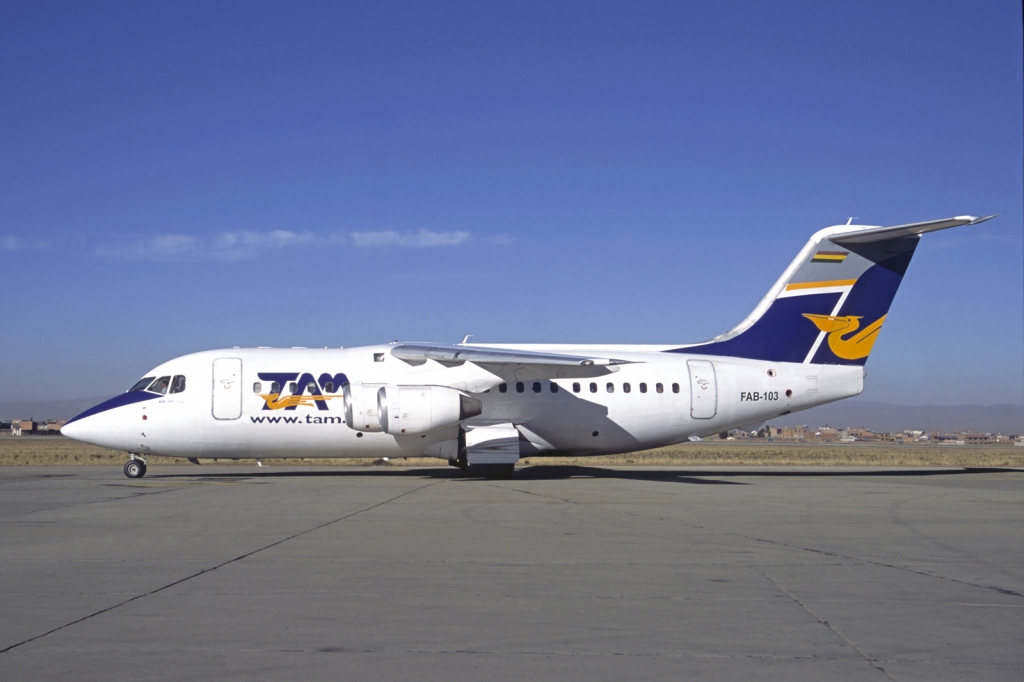
British Aerospace 146

=== Historic fleet ===
Throughout its history, TAMep operated a highly diverse fleet composed of piston, turboprop, and turbojet aircraft, which over the years played a key role in providing air connectivity to remote cities across Bolivia. Some of these aircraft have been preserved and can now be seen at places such as the Bolivian Air Force Museum, located next to El Alto International Airport in La Paz, and the Aircraft Plaza at the Colegio Militar de Aviación (COLMILAV), adjacent to El Trompillo Airport in Santa Cruz de la Sierra.

TAMep Historic Fleet

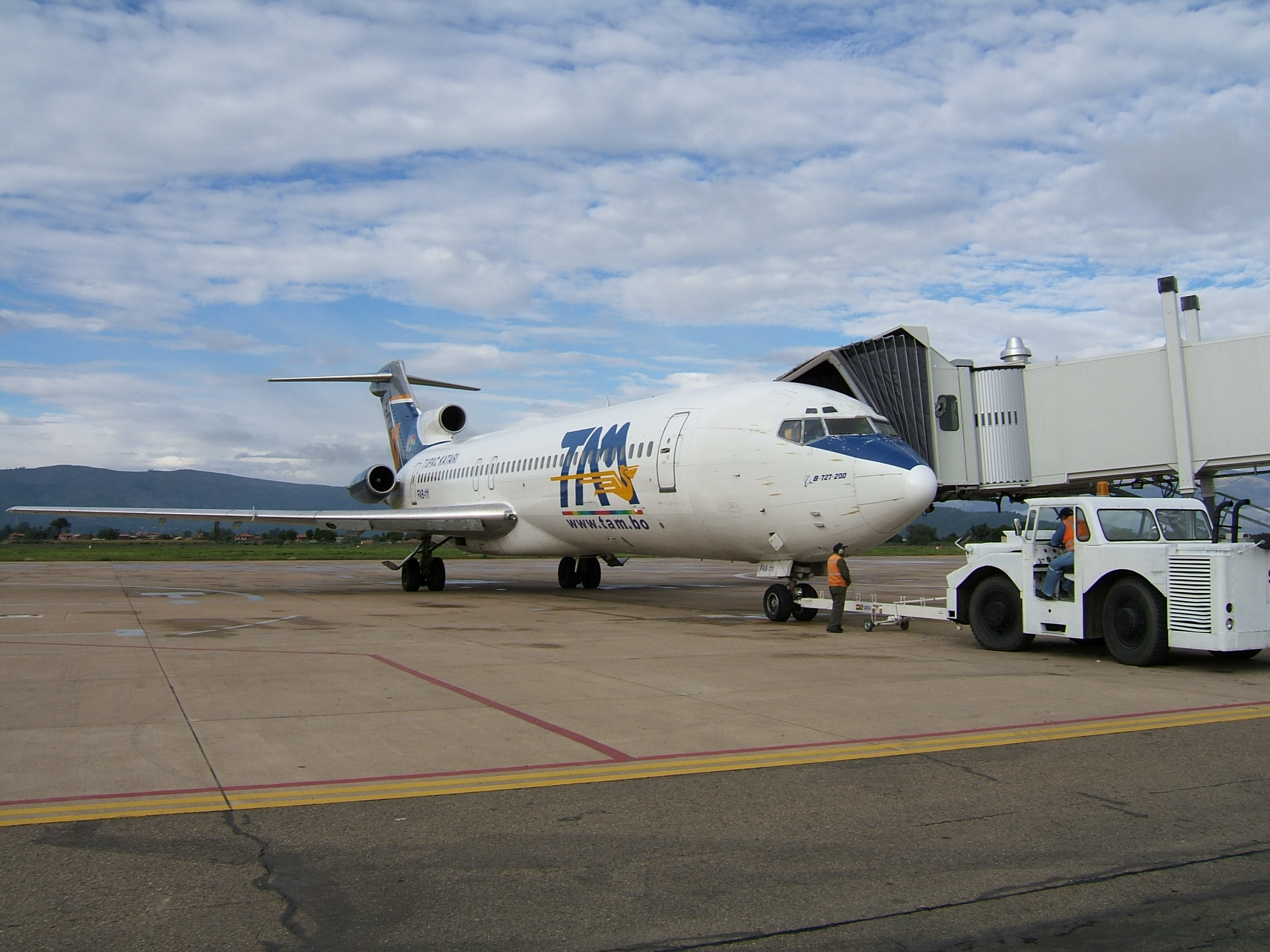
Boeing 727

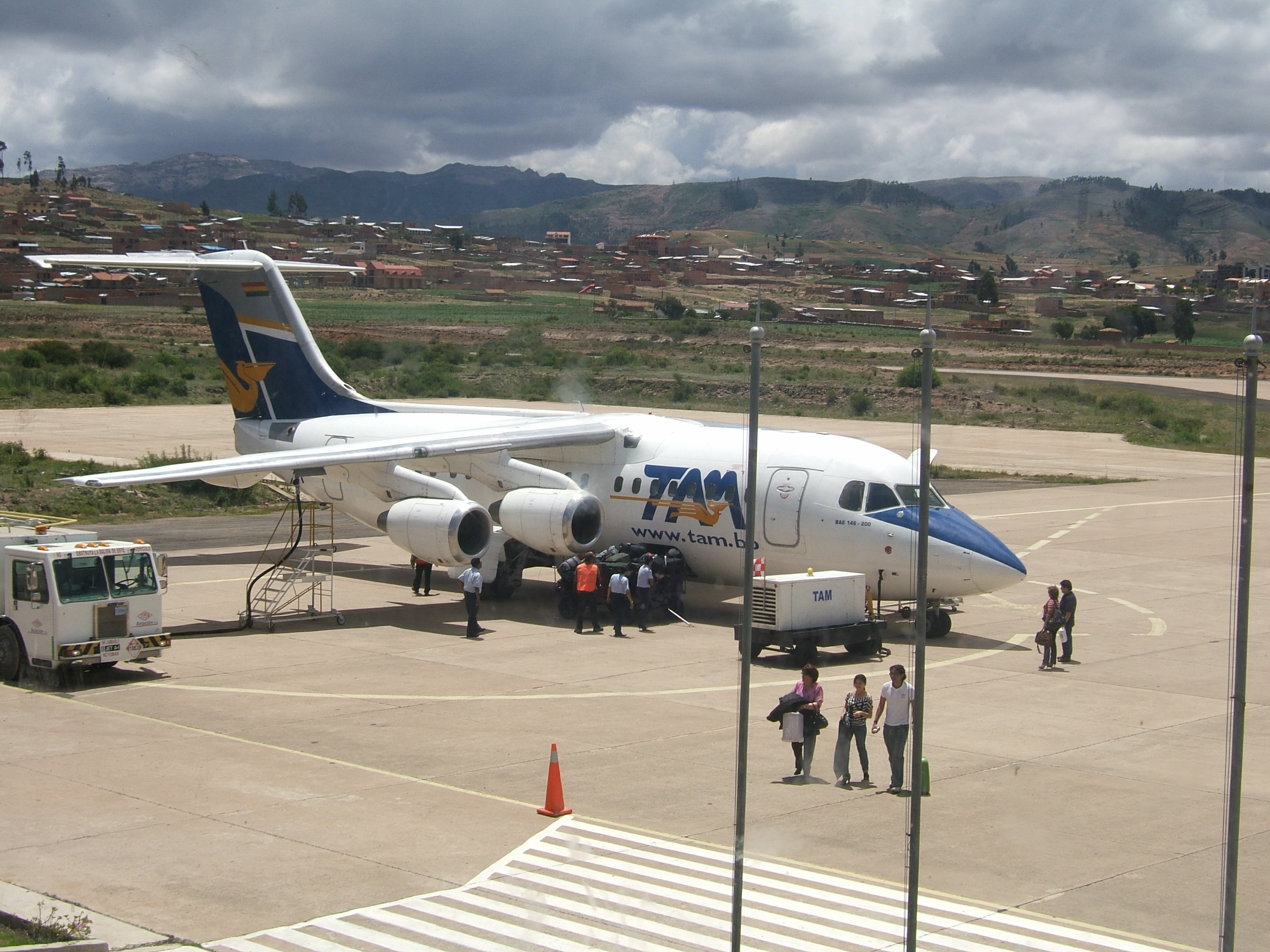
BAe 146

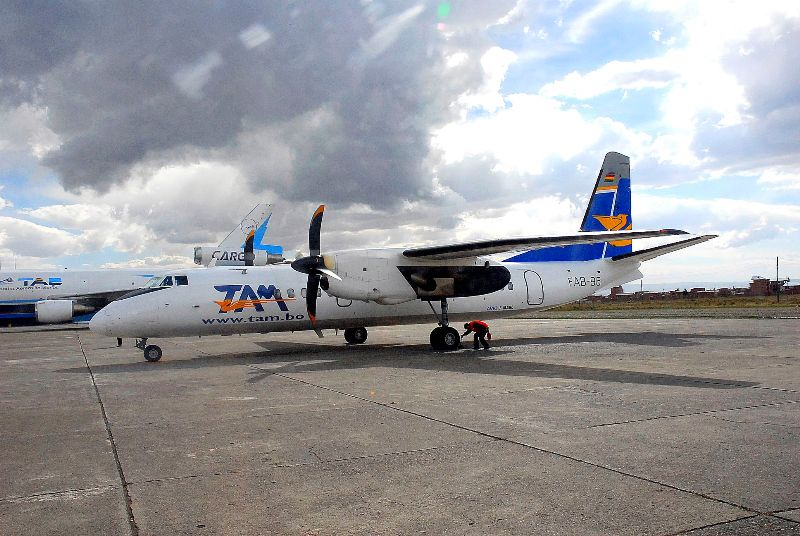
Xi'an MA60

Retired TAMep Fleet
Aircraft	Total	Introduced	Retired	Notes
Basler BT-67	2	1991	1997	Reg. TAM-38 preserved in COLMILAV at SRZ
Beechcraft 1900C	1	1998	2011	Reg. FAB-043 trf to the Bolivian Air Force; Crashed near El Alto in 2011
Boeing 727-200	1	2011	2013	Reg. FAB-111 wfu and std at CBB
Boeing 737-200	6	2012	2015	Reg. FAB-117 trf to the Bolivian Air Force; Five aircraft wfu and std at CBB
Boeing 737-300	1	2013	2015	Reg. FAB-115 std at CBB after engine disappearance
BAe Jetstream 31	2	2013	2014	All two trf to the Bolivian Air Force
British Aerospace 146	7	2007	2017	Reg. FAB-106 trf to the Bolivian Air Force; Five aircraft wfu and std at LPB; Reg. FAB-103 preserved in the Bolivian Air Force Museum
CASA C212	6	1975	2017	All six trf to the Bolivian Air Force
Convair CV-440	13	1972	1990	Reg. TAM-44 crashed near Caranavi in 1975
Convair CV-580 Metropolitan	8	1971	1997	Reg. FAB-72 preserved in the Bolivian Air Force Museum
Curtiss C-46 Commando	4	1964	1987	All four trf to the Bolivian Air Force
Douglas DC-3/C-47 Dakota	34	1945	1997	Reg. TAM-16 preserved in the Bolivian Air Force Museum
Douglas DC-4/C-54 Skymaster	4	1945	1980	Reg. TAM-52 disappeared on January 10, 1974; Debris located in 2000 on Mount Mik'aya near La Paz
Fokker F27	6	1979	2019	Reg. FAB-90 trf to the Bolivian Air Force; Reg. FAB-95 preserved in the Bolivian Air Force Museum
IAI 201 Arava	6	1975	2018	Reg. TAM-75 preserved in the Bolivian Air Force Museum
Lockheed L-188 Electra	1	1973	1995	Reg. TAM-69 preserved in the Bolivian Air Force Museum
Xi'an MA60	2	2008	2012	All two aircraft wfu and std at CBB

== Accidents and incidents ==
- On 11 September 1962 Captain Walter Arze Rojas's aircraft crashed after the plane was given standard gasoline instead of aviation fuel.
- On 12 February 1970, Douglas DC-3 TAM-11 crashed while attempting an emergency landing at Laja Airport. The aircraft was operating a non-scheduled passenger flight. All five people on board survived.
- On 14 July 1970, Douglas DC-3 TAM-17 was damaged beyond repair in an accident at El Alto International Airport, La Paz.
- On 4 May 1971, Douglas C-47 TAM-22 crashed shortly after take-off from El Alto Airport, La Paz on a cargo flight to El Jovi Airport.
- On 25 September 1972, Douglas C-47A TAM-24 was reported to have been damaged beyond economic repair in an accident at Caranavi Airport.
- On 19 January 1974, Douglas DC-3 TAM-30 was damaged beyond economic repair in a wheels-up landing at Laia.
- On 11 November 1974, Douglas DC-3 TAM-34 crashed near the Sorata Mountain shortly after take-off from El Alto Airport.
- On 27 October 1975, a CV-440 crashed into the Cerro Colorado volcano during takeoff, killing all 4 crew and 63 passengers on board. The aircraft was carrying military officers and their families.
- On 18 March 2011, a Xian MA60 (with Bolivian registration FAB-96) with 33 passengers and crew aboard, performed an emergency landing without locked nose landing gear in the airport of the touristic Amazonian village of Rurrenabaque, on arrival from La Paz. No injuries were reported.
- On 9 January 2012 a Xian MA60 (with Bolivian registration FAB-96) with 16 passengers and 5 crew aboard performed an emergency landing without landing gear lowered at Guayaramerin on arrival from Riberalta. No injuries occurred, but the aircraft was substantially damaged.
