= Bolivian Air Force Museum =

Aerospace Museum of the Air Force of Bolivia
- Museo Aeroespacial de la Fuerza Aérea Boliviana
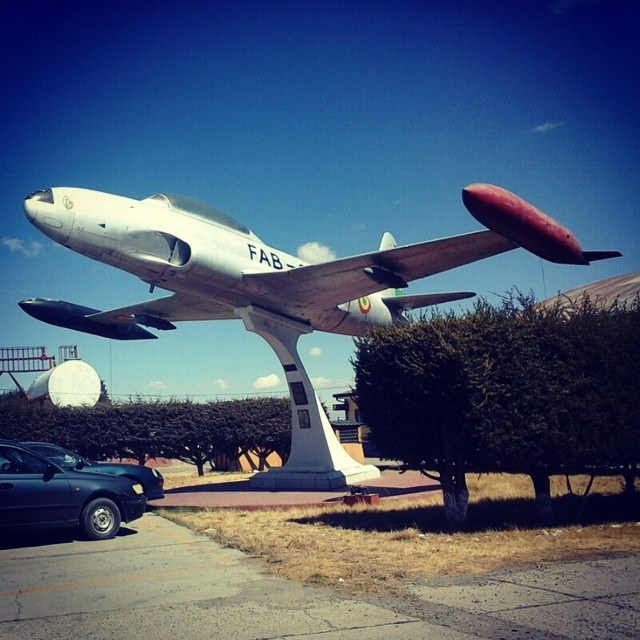

- Location within Bolivia
- Established: 2015
- Location: El Alto, La Paz
- Coordinates: 16.5016°S 68.1751°W
- Type: Military aviation museum
- Website: museoaeroespacialfab.wixsite.com/oficial

The Bolivian Air Force Museum is an aviation museum located at El Alto International Airport in El Alto, La Paz.

== History ==
In 1958, Amalia Villa de la Tapia began acquiring artifacts related to the history of aviation in Bolivia and these formed the genesis of the Bolivian Air Force's Historical Collection. The historian Ramiro Molina Alanes took over her role as curator of the collection in 1985. Starting in 2001 it was housed in the air force headquarters.

However, the museum was moved to a new location at El Alto International Airport in 2015.

== Collection ==
- Aérospatiale Alouette III
- Aerotec T-23 Uirapuru
- BAe 146-200
- Beechcraft VT-34A Mentor
- Bell UH-1H Iroquois
- Cessna 152
- Cessna U206G Stationair
- Convair 580
- Douglas C-47 Dakota
- Fokker F27-400M Troopship
- Helibras HB 315B Gaviao
- IAI 201 Arava
- Lancair 360
- Lockheed C-130A Hercules
- Lockheed L-188A Electra
- Lockheed T-33A
- Neiva T-25 Universal
- North American T-6D Texan
- North American T-28A Trojan
- Pilatus PC-7
- Rockwell 690 Turbo Commander
- Stearman PT-17 Kaydet

== See also ==
- List of aerospace museums
