= Bolivian Air Force =

Air warfare branch of Bolivia's military forces

- Fuerza Aérea Boliviana
- Emblem of the Bolivian Air Force
- Founded: 26 September 1957; 68 years ago
- Country: Bolivia
- Type: Air force
- Role: Aerial warfare
- Part of: Bolivian Armed Forces
- Nickname: FAB

Commanders
- General of the Air Force: Zabala Álvarez
- Notable commanders: Rafael Pabón; Bernardino Bilbao Rioja

Insignia
- Roundel

- Fin flash

Aircraft flown
- Reconnaissance: Learjet 35
- Trainer: Hongdu JL-8VB, Pilatus PC-7 Turbo Trainer
- Transport: Lockheed C-130 Hercules

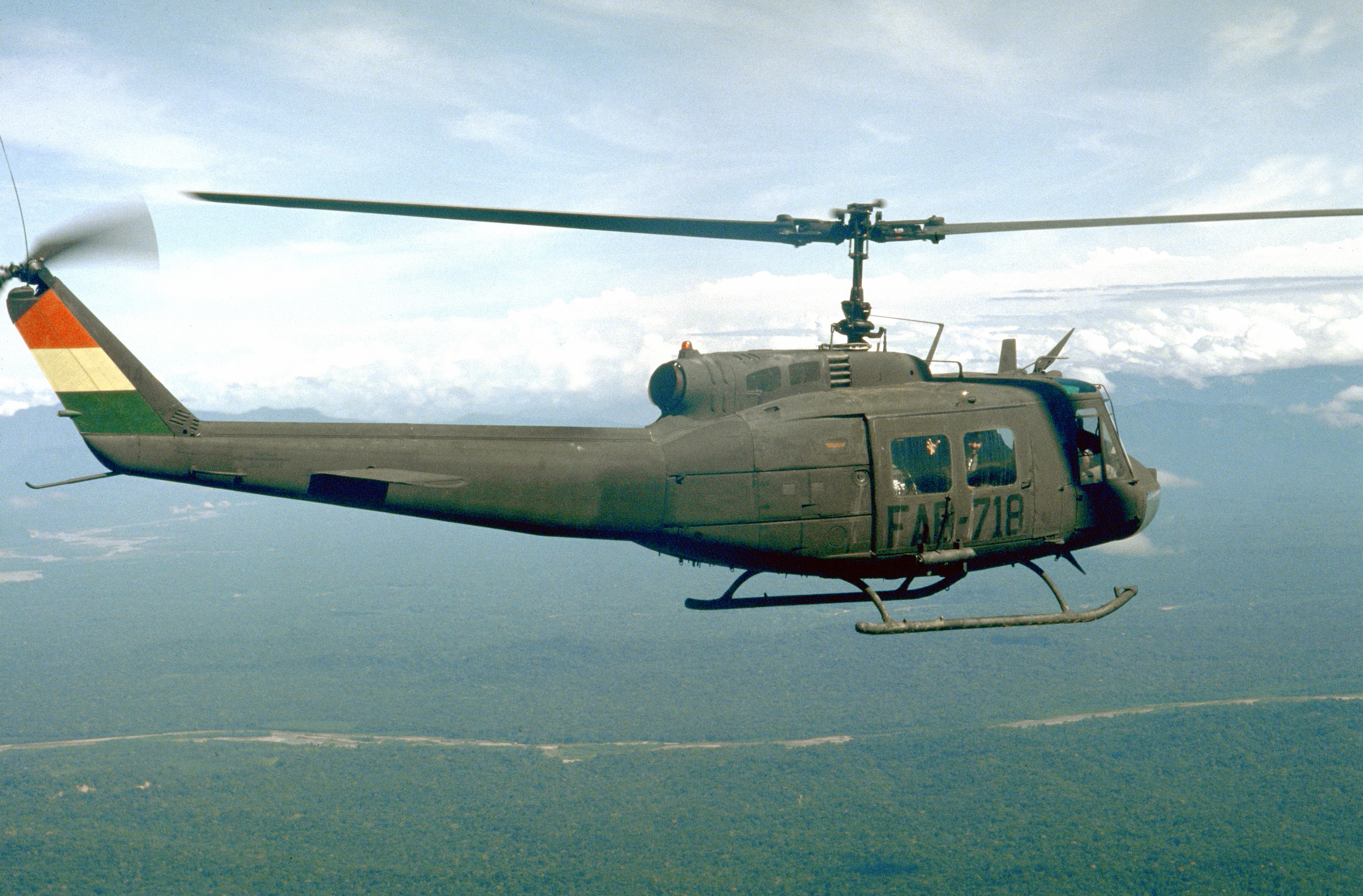
A UH-1 of the FAB in flight

The Bolivian Air Force (BAF; Spanish: Fuerza Aérea Boliviana, FAB) is the air force of Bolivia and branch of the Bolivian Armed Forces.

== History ==
By 1938 the Bolivian air force consisted of about 60 aircraft (Curtiss Hawk fighters, Curtiss T-32 Condor II and Junkers W 34 bombers, Junkers Ju 86 used as transport craft, and Fokker C.V, Breguet 19 and Vickers Vespa reconnaissance planes), and about 300 staff; the officers were trained in Italy.

In 2017 Bolivia finally retired the Lockheed T-33 marking the end of 44 years of service. Bolivia was the last operator of the T-33.

== Organization ==
FAB is organized into air brigades, which is formed by one to three air groups. The air groups are based at La Paz, Cochabamba, Santa Cruz de la Sierra, Puerto Suárez, Tarija, Villamontes, Cobija, Trinidad, Riberalta, Roboré, Uyuni, Oruro, Sucre and Chimoré.

Major commands included the following:

- General Command Systems Department in La Paz, equipped with sophisticated computers.

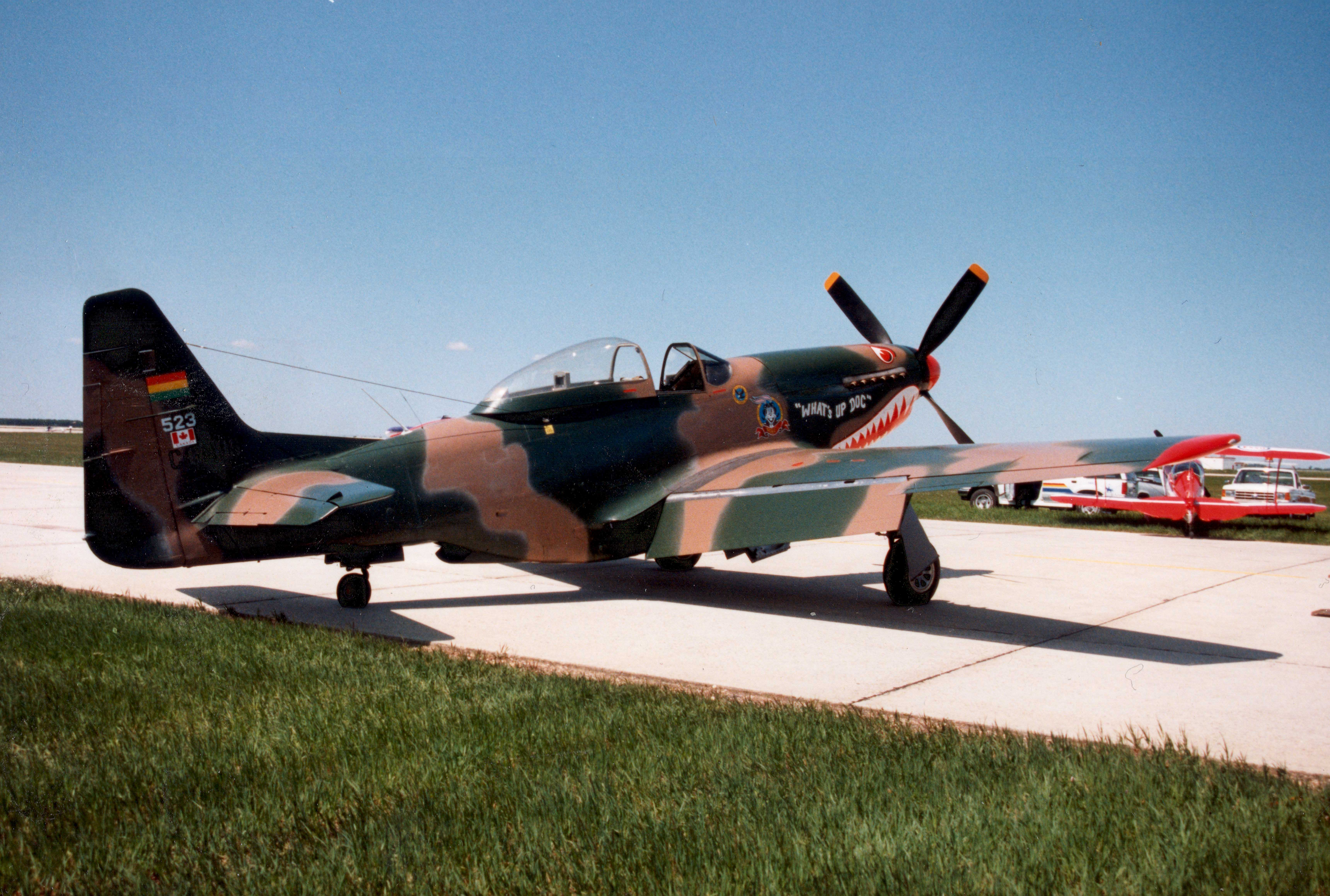
A Cavalier Mustang, formerly of the Bolivian Air Force, parked on a Canadian airfield.

- Group of Air-Defense (Grupo Aereo de Defensa Anteaerea – GADA): GADA-91 (I BRIGADE), GADA-92 (II BRIGADE), GADA-93 (III BRIGADE), GADA-94 (IV BRIGADE), GADA-95 (V BRIGADE), GADA-96 (VI BRIGADE) and GADA-97 (I BRIGADE).
- Six air brigades with subordinate air groups.
  - First Air Brigade (El Alto):
    - Fighter group 31 "Gral. Jorge Jordán Mercado": Fighter squadron 311, Executive squadron 310
    - Transport air group 71 "Gen.W.A.Rojas" (Military airlift TAM):Air squadron 710, Air squadron 711, Air squadron 712
    - Aerophotogrammetry National Service (NSS)
    - Air group 1 – Air group VIP
    - Air group 66 – air base in Oruro
    - Transporte Aereo Boliviano-TAB
    - Task Force "Black Devils"
    - Group air defence artillery GADA-91
    - Group air defence artillery GADA-97
  - Second Air Brigade (Cochabamba):
    - Fighter group 34 "P.R.Cuevas": Aerotactico squadron 340, Link training squadron 341
    - Air group search and rescue 51: Helicopter Squadron 511
    - Air group training 22 – air base in Chimore (helicopter training)
    - Air group 67 – air base in Sucre
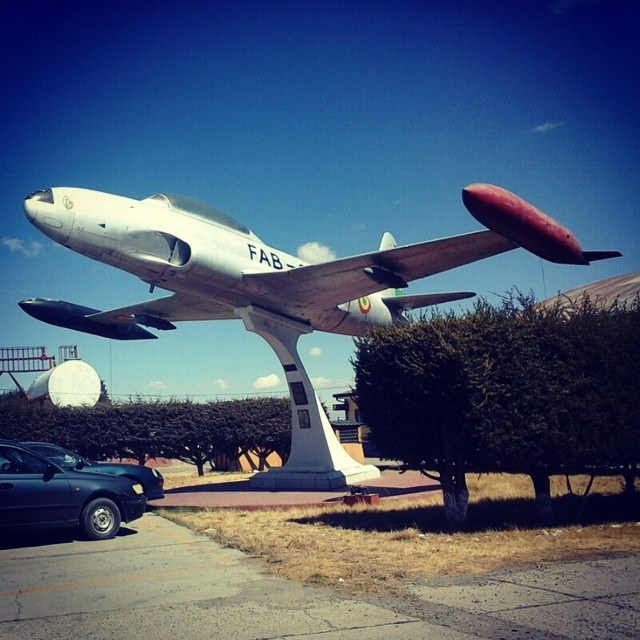
    - A T-33 of the FAB
      Group air defence artillery GADA-92
  - Third Air Brigade (Santa Cruz):
    - Fighter group 32 "B.B.Rioja" (CEPAC): squadron 321, squadron 320, squadron 327 (maintenance)
    - COLMILAV Air group training 21 – Training squadrons: primary squadron, basic squadron, squadron "NN" (prob.navigation)
    - Air group 83(air base Puerto Suarez): 831 squadron
    - Air group 61 "Gen.L.G.Pereiera (air base Robore): squadron 610
    - Task force "Red Devils" (air base El Trompillo-Robore)
    - Group air defence artillery GADA-93
  - Fourth Air Brigade (Tarija):
    - Air Group 82 "Cap.A.V.Peralta" (air base Camiri): squadron 821
    - Air Group 63 "Tcnl.E.L.Rivera" (air base Villamontes): squadron 630
    - Air Group 41 – (air base Tarija)
    - Air group 65 – (air base Uyuni)
    - Group air defence artillery GADA-94
  - Fifth Air Brigade (Trinidad):
    - Group air 72 – air base Trinidad
    - Group air 62 – air base Riberalta
    - Group air defence artillery GADA-95
  - Sixth Air Brigade (Cobija):
    - Group air 64 – air base Cobija
    - Group air defence artillery GADA-96

== Civil aviation ==
The General Directorate of Civil Aeronautics (Dirección General de Aeronáutica Civil—DGAC) formerly part of the FAB, administers a civil aeronautics school called the National Institute of Civil Aeronautics (Instituto Nacional de Aeronáutica Civil—INAC), and two commercial air transport services; TAM and TAB.

=== Bolivian Military Airline (TAM) ===
Bolivian Military Airline (Transporte Aéreo Militar / TAM) is an airline based in La Paz, Bolivia. It is the civilian wing of the 'Fuerza Aérea Boliviana' (the Bolivian Air Force), operating passenger services to remote towns and communities in the North and Northeast of Bolivia. TAM (aka TAM Group 71) has been a part of the FAB since 1945.

A similar airline serving the Beni Department with small planes is Línea Aérea Amaszonas, using smaller planes than TAM.

The Bolivian Ministry of Defence and Ministry of Public Works, Services and Housing announced on 8 December 2016 that TAM would cease transporting civilian passengers and cargo on 16 December 2016. The decision was to allow TAM to reorganize with a status akin to the state-sponsored Boliviana de Aviacion prior to resuming service under civilian regulations.

=== Bolivian Air Transport (TAB) ===
Although a civil transport airline, Bolivian Air Transport (Transportes Aéreos Bolivianos / TAB, was created as a subsidiary company of the FAB in 1977. It is subordinate to the Air Transport Management (Gerencia de Transportes Aéreos) and is headed by an FAB general. TAB, a charter heavy cargo airline, links Bolivia with most countries of the Western Hemisphere; its inventory included a fleet of Lockheed C-130 Hercules aircraft. TAB's Base of operations was headquartered at El Alto, adjacent to La Paz's El Alto International Airport. TAB also flew to Miami and Houston, with stops in Panama.

== Aircraft ==
=== Current inventory ===
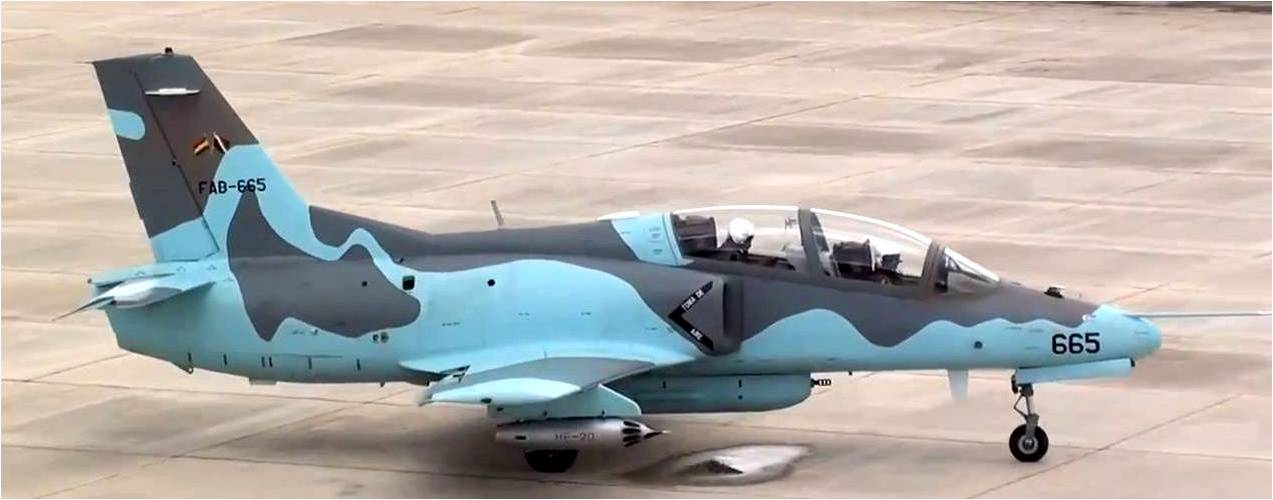
A K-8 Karakorum light attack / trainer jet

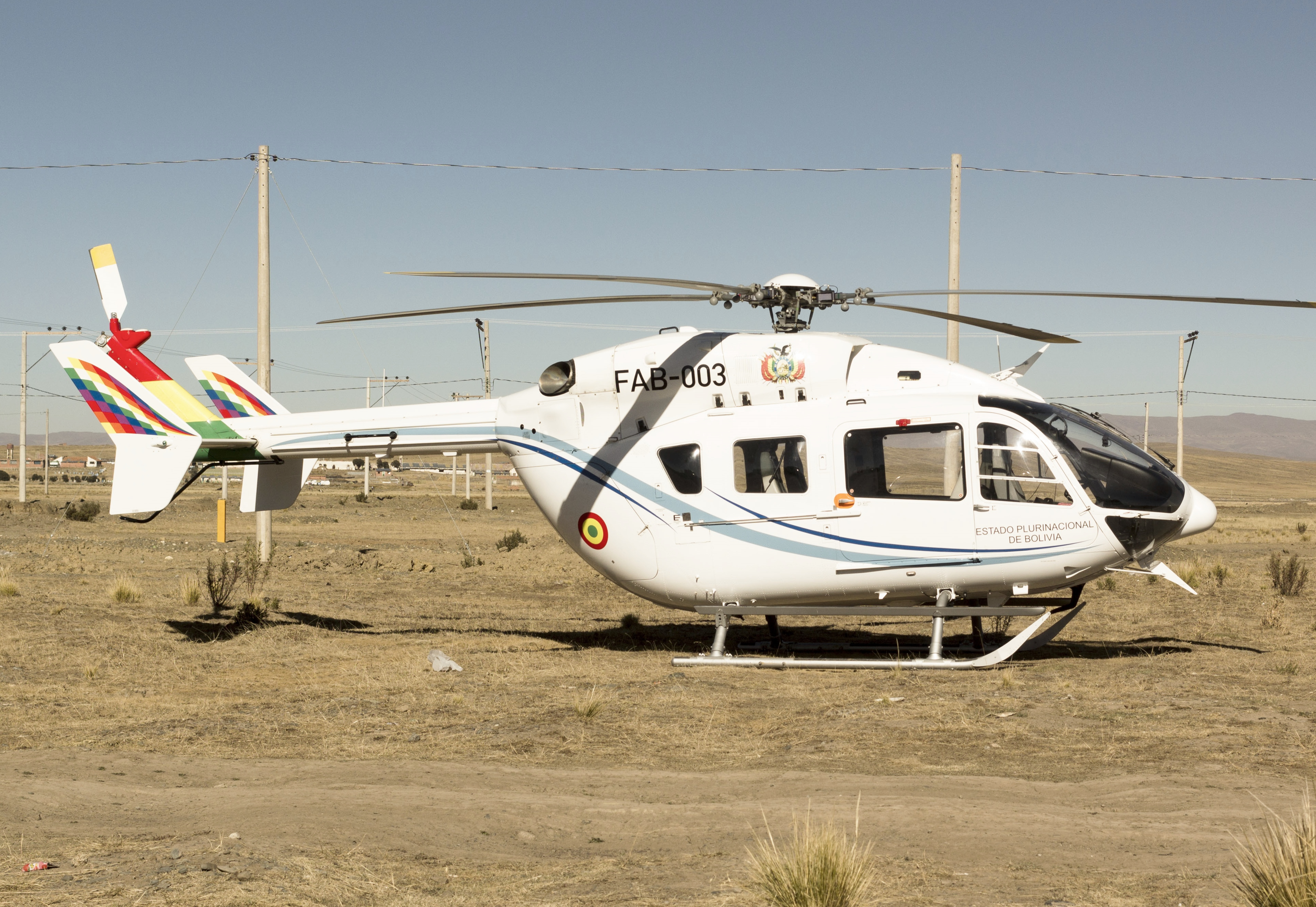
A Eurocopter EC-145 helicopter used in Bolivia as presidential transport.

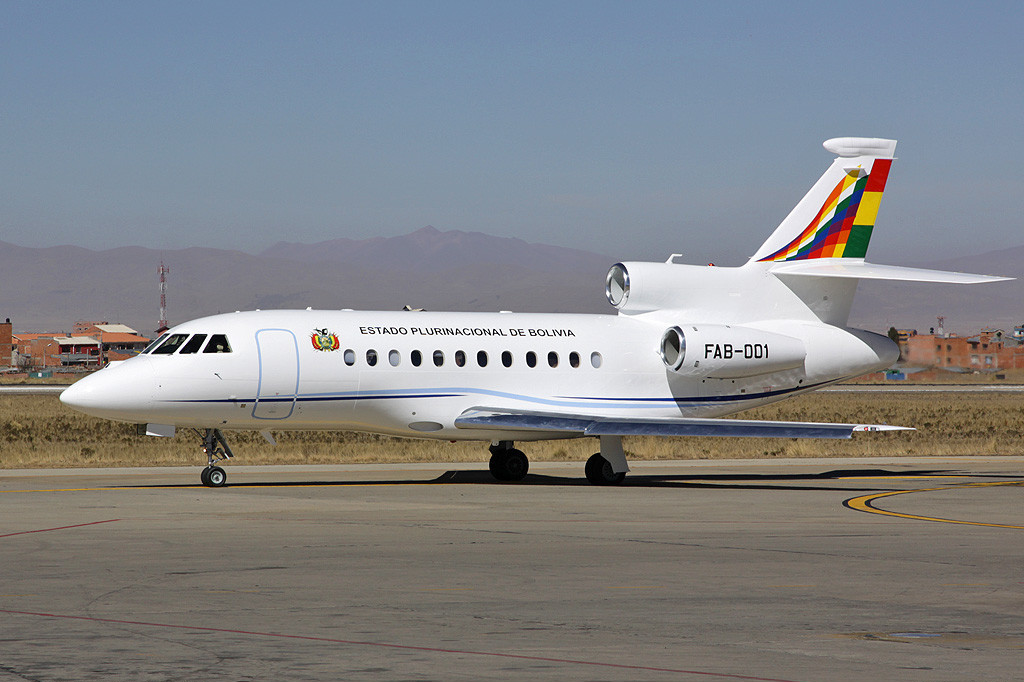
A Dassault Falcon 900EX used by the President of Bolivia

Aircraft	Origin	Type	Variant	In service	Notes
Reconnaissance
Learjet 35	United States	Surveillance		2	
Transport
C-130 Hercules	United States	Transport	C-130B/H	3	One C-130H crashed on 27 February 2026
Cessna 402	United States	Transport		1	
Fokker F27 Friendship	Netherlands	Transport		1	
British Aerospace Jetstream	United Kingdom	Transport	Jetstream 31	2	
Beechcraft King Air	United States	Transport	90/200/250/350	5	
Falcon 900	France	VIP transport		1	
Falcon 50	France	VIP transport		1	
Helicopters
Eurocopter AS350	France	Utility	H125M/AS350	2	Called "Écureuil"/"Squirrel"
Eurocopter EC145	Germany	SAR / Utility	H145	3	
Eurocopter AS332	France	Transport / Utility	H215M/AS332	6	Called "Super Puma"
Robinson R66	United States			1	
Aérospatiale SA316	France	Liaison	SE3160	1	
Bell UH-1	United States	Utility	UH-1H	11	
Trainer aircraft
Karakoram K-8	China/Pakistan	Jet trainer		4	
Pilatus PC-7	Switzerland	Trainer		2	
Robinson R44	United States	Rotorcraft trainer		6	
Zlín Z 42	Czech Republic	Basic trainer	Z 242L	8	
UAV
RemoEye-006	South Korea	Surveillance		2	

=== Retired aircraft ===
BAE Systems 146, Breguet 19, Cavalier Mustang, Curtiss Hawk, Curtiss T-32 Condor II, Diamond DA40, Fokker C.V, Junkers Ju 86, Junkers W 34, Helibras HB350 Esquilo, Lockheed T-33, Vickers Vespa

== Future acquisitions ==
During a 31 July 2017 ceremony, which was attended by the armed forces' high command, four models of lead-in fighter trainers (LIFT; L-15, M-346, T-50, and Yak-130) were presented with a potential to replace the T-33 and reequip the GAC-31. The FAB's Commander expressed the FAB's preference for the Yak-130.

== See also ==
- Bolivian Air Force Museum

== Bibliography ==
- Andrade, John (1982). Militair 1982. London: Aviation Press Limited. ISBN 0-907898-01-7.
- Hagedorn, Daniel P. (September–October 1996). "Talkback". Air Enthusiast (65): 80. ISSN 0143-5450.
