= List of airports in Colombia =

This is a list of airports in Colombia, grouped by type and sorted by location.

== Airports ==
Airport names shown in bold indicate the airport has scheduled service on commercial airlines.

City served / location	Department	ICAO	IATA	Airport name	Airport type	Coordinates	Refs
**Controlled airports**
Apartadó / Carepa	Antioquia	SKLC	APO	**Antonio Roldán Betancur Airport**	Domestic	07°48′42″N 76°42′59″W	
Arauca	Arauca	SKUC	AUC	**Santiago Pérez Quiroz Airport**	Domestic	07°04′09″N 70°44′13″W	
Armenia / La Tebaida	Quindío	SKAR	AXM	**El Edén International Airport**	International	04°27′06″N 75°45′58″W	
Bahía Solano	Chocó	SKBS	BSC	**José Celestino Mutis Airport**	Domestic	06°12′11″N 77°23′42″W	
Barrancabermeja	Santander	SKEJ	EJA	**Yariguíes Airport**	Domestic	07°01′28″N 73°48′25″W	
Barranquilla / Soledad	Atlántico	SKBQ	BAQ	**Ernesto Cortissoz International Airport**	International	10°53′19″N 74°46′54″W	
Bogotá	Distrito Capital	SKBO	BOG	**El Dorado International Airport**	International	04°42′06″N 74°08′49″W	
Bogotá / Chía	Distrito Capital^{1}	SKGY	GYM	Guaymaral Airport	Domestic	04°48′45″N 74°03′54″W	
Bucaramanga / Lebrija	Santander	SKBG	BGA	**Palonegro International Airport**	International	07°07′36″N 73°11′05″W	
Buenaventura	Valle del Cauca	SKBU	BUN	**Gerardo Tobar López Airport**	Domestic	03°49′10″N 76°59′24″W	
Cali / Palmira	Valle del Cauca	SKCL	CLO	**Alfonso Bonilla Aragón International Airport**	International	03°32′35″N 76°22′54″W	
Cartagena	Bolívar	SKCG	CTG	**Rafael Núñez International Airport**	International	10°26′31″N 75°30′46″W	
Cartago	Valle del Cauca	SKGO	CRC	**Santa Ana Airport**	Domestic	04°45′30″N 75°57′22″W	
Corozal	Sucre	SKCZ	CZU	**Las Brujas Airport**	Domestic	09°19′57″N 75°17′07″W	
Cúcuta	Norte de Santander	SKCC	CUC	**Camilo Daza International Airport**	International	07°55′39″N 72°30′42″W	
Yopal (El Yopal)	Casanare	SKYP	EYP	**El Alcaraván Airport** (El Yopal Airport)	Domestic	05°19′09″N 72°23′03″W	
Florencia	Caquetá	SKFL	FLA	**Gustavo Artunduaga Paredes Airport**	Domestic	01°35′21″N 75°33′51″W	
Girardot / Flandes	Tolima^{2}	SKGI	GIR	**Santiago Vila Airport**	Domestic	04°16′31″N 74°47′46″W	
Guapi	Cauca	SKGP	GPI	**Juan Casiano Airport**	Domestic	02°34′12″N 77°53′53″W	
Ibagué	Tolima	SKIB	IBE	**Perales Airport**	Domestic	04°25′18″N 75°08′01″W	
Leticia	Amazonas	SKLT	LET	**Alfredo Vásquez Cobo International Airport**	International	04°11′31″S 69°56′32″W	
Manizales	Caldas	SKMZ	MZL	**La Nubia Airport**	Domestic	05°01′48″N 75°27′56″W	
Mariquita	Tolima	SKQU	MQU	Mariquita Airport	Domestic	05°12′45″N 74°53′01″W	
Medellín	Antioquia	SKMD	EOH	**Olaya Herrera Airport**	Domestic	06°13′14″N 75°35′26″W	
Medellín / Rionegro	Antioquia	SKRG	MDE	**José María Córdova International Airport**	International	06°09′52″N 75°25′23″W	
Mitú	Vaupés	SKMU	MVP	**Fabio Alberto León Bentley Airport**	Domestic	01°15′13″N 70°14′03″W	
Montería	Córdoba	SKMR	MTR	**Los Garzones Airport**	Domestic	08°49′22″N 75°49′31″W	
Neiva	Huila	SKNV	NVA	**Benito Salas Airport**	Domestic	02°57′01″N 75°17′38″W	
Pasto / Chachagüí	Nariño	SKPS	PSO	**Antonio Nariño Airport**	Domestic	01°23′47″N 77°17′28″W	
Pereira	Risaralda	SKPE	PEI	**Matecaña International Airport**	International	04°48′46″N 75°44′22″W	
Popayán	Cauca	SKPP	PPN	**Guillermo León Valencia Airport**	Domestic	02°27′16″N 76°36′35″W	
Providencia Island	San Andrés y Providencia	SKPV	PVA	**El Embrujo Airport**	Domestic	13°21′26″N 81°21′29″W	
Puerto Asís	Putumayo	SKAS	PUU	**Tres de Mayo Airport**	Domestic	00°30′21″N 76°30′03″W	
Puerto Carreño	Vichada	SKPC	PCR	**Germán Olano Airport**	Domestic	06°11′06″N 67°29′33″W	
Quibdó	Chocó	SKUI	UIB	**El Caraño Airport**	Domestic	05°41′27″N 76°38′28″W	
Riohacha	La Guajira	SKRH	RCH	**Almirante Padilla Airport**	Domestic	11°31′34″N 72°55′36″W	
San Andrés	San Andrés y Providencia	SKSP	ADZ	**Gustavo Rojas Pinilla Int'l Airport**	International	12°35′01″N 81°42′41″W	
San José del Guaviare	Guaviare	SKSJ	SJE	**Jorge Enrique González Torres Airport**	Domestic	02°34′47″N 72°38′21″W	
San Vicente del Caguán	Caquetá	SKSV	SVI	**Eduardo Falla Solano Airport**	Domestic	02°09′07″N 74°45′58″W	
Santa Marta	Magdalena	SKSM	SMR	**Simón Bolívar International Airport**	International	11°07′11″N 74°13′50″W	
Saravena	Arauca	SKSA	RVE	**Los Colonizadores Airport**	Domestic	06°57′01″N 71°51′22″W	
Tame	Arauca	SKTM	TME	**Gabriel Vargas Santos Airport**	Domestic	06°27′04″N 71°45′36″W	
Tolú	Sucre	SKTL	TLU	**Golfo de Morrosquillo Airport**	Domestic	09°30′34″N 75°35′09″W	
Tumaco	Nariño	SKCO	TCO	**La Florida Airport**	Domestic	01°48′52″N 78°44′57″W	
Valledupar	Cesar	SKVP	VUP	**Alfonso López Pumarejo Airport**	Domestic	10°26′06″N 73°14′58″W	
Villavicencio	Meta	SKVV	VVC	**Vanguardia Airport**	Domestic	04°10′06″N 73°36′53″W	
**Uncontrolled airports**
Acandí	Chocó	SKAD	ACD	**Alcides Fernández Airport**		08°29′53″N 77°16′26″W	
Aguachica	Cesar	SKAG		**Hacaritama Airport**		08°14′46″N 73°34′51″W	
Amalfi	Antioquia	SKAM	AFI	Amalfi Airport		06°53′44″N 75°02′51″W	
Araracuara	Caquetá	SKAC	ACR	**Araracuara Airport**		00°36′03″S 72°23′53″W	
Arauquita	Arauca	SKAT	ARQ	El Troncal Airport		07°01′16″N 71°23′20″W	
Barranco Minas	Guainía	SKBM	NBB	Barranco Minas Airport		03°39′26″N 69°48′35″W	
Capurganá	Chocó	SKCA	CPB	**Capurganá Airport**		08°37′50″N 77°21′01″W	
Carimagua	Meta	SKCI	CCO	Carimagua Airport		04°33′54″N 71°20′12″W	
Caruru	Vaupés	SKCR	CUO	Carurú Airport		01°00′48″N 71°17′46″W	
Caucasia	Antioquia	SKCU	CAQ	**Juan H. White Airport**		07°58′03″N 75°11′53″W	
Chaparral	Tolima	SKHA	CPL	General Navas Pardo Airport		03°43′26″N 75°27′55″W	
Chigorodó	Antioquia	SKIG	IGO	Jaime Ortiz Betancur Airport		7°40′45″N 76°41′00″W	
Cicuco	Bolívar	SKIO		Cicuco Airport		09°16′08″N 74°39′08″W	
Ciénaga de Oro / Berastegui	Córdoba	SKBR		Berástegui Airport		08°53′04″N 75°41′01″W	
Cimitarra	Santander	SKCM	CIM	Cimitarra Airport		06°22′03″N 73°58′14″W	
Condoto	Chocó	SKCD	COG	**Mandinga Airport**		05°04′19″N 76°40′36″W	
Cravo Norte	Arauca	SKCN	RAV	Cravo Norte Airport		06°19′00″N 70°12′40″W	
Cumaribo	Vichada	SKUM		Cumaribo Airport		04°26′47″N 69°46′53″W	
Cupica	Chocó	SKCP	BHF	Cupica Airport		06°41′55″N 77°29′00″W	
El Bagre	Antioquia	SKEB	EBG	El Bagre Airport (El Tomin Airport)		07°35′42″N 74°48′32″W	
El Banco	Magdalena	SKBC	ELB	Las Flores Airport		09°02′41″N 73°58′25″W	
El Carmen de Bolívar	Bolívar	SKCB		El Carmen de Bolívar Airport		09°40′54″N 75°07′28″W	
El Charco	Nariño	SKEH	ECR	El Charco Airport		02°26′27″N 78°06′00″W	
Garzón / La Jagua	Huila	SKGZ		Garzón Airport		02°08′47″N 75°41′39″W	
Gaviotas (La Gaviota)	Vichada	SKGA	LGT	Las Gaviotas Airport (La Gaviota Airport)		04°33′02″N 70°55′32″W	
Hacienda Nápoles	Antioquia			Hacienda Napoles Airstrip	Private	05°55′20″N 74°43′42″W	
Hato Corozal	Casanare	SKHC	HTZ	Hato Corozal Airport		06°09′13″N 71°45′42″W	
Ibagué	Tolima	SKCE		Cruz Verde Airport	Private	04°23′23″N 75°07′51″W	
Ipiales / Aldana	Nariño	SKIP	IPI	**San Luis Airport**		00°51′43″N 77°40′19″W	
Juradó	Chocó	SKJU	JUO	Juradó Airport		07°04′25″N 77°43′45″W	
La Jagua de Ibirico	Cesar	SKLB		El Borrego Airport	Private	09°35′06″N 73°27′07″W	
La Chorrera	Amazonas		LCR	**La Chorrera Airport** (Virgilio Barco Vargas Airport)		01°27′23″S 72°48′04″W	
La Loma / Calenturitas	Cesar	SKAL		Calenturitas Airport	Private	09°39′12″N 73°29′41″W	
La Macarena	Meta	SKNA	LMC	**La Macarena Airport**		02°10′33″N 73°47′12″W	
La Pedrera	Amazonas	SKLP	LPD	**La Pedrera Airport**		01°19′29″S 69°34′53″W	
La Primavera	Vichada	SKIM	LPE	La Primavera Airport		05°28′39″N 70°25′17″W	
Magangué	Bolívar	SKMG	MGN	Baracoa Regional Airport		09°17′06″N 74°50′47″W	
Maicao	La Guajira	SKLM	MCJ	Jorge Isaacs Airport (La Mina Airport)		11°13′57″N 72°29′21″W	
Maicao	La Guajira	SKMJ		Maicao Airport (La Majayura Airport)		11°23′24″N 72°14′20″W	
Málaga	Santander	SKLA		Jerónimo de Aguayo Airport		06°42′21″N 72°43′49″W	
Mapiripán	Meta	SKIR		Mapiripán Airport		02°53′50″N 72°08′28″W	
Miraflores	Guaviare	SKMF	MFS	Miraflores Airport		01°20′15″N 71°57′02″W	
Mompós (Mompóx)	Bolívar	SKMP	MMP	**San Bernardo Airport**		09°15′30″N 74°26′18″W	
Montelíbano	Córdoba	SKML	MTB	Montelíbano Airport		07°58′18″N 75°25′57″W	
Necoclí	Antioquia	SKNC	NCI	Necoclí Airport (Antioquia Airport)		08°27′12″N 76°46′43″W	
Nuquí	Chocó	SKNQ	NQU	**Reyes Murillo Airport**		05°42′37″N 77°15′43″W	
Ocaña	Norte de Santander	SKOC	OCV	**Aguas Claras Airport**		08°18′56″N 73°21′30″W	
Orito	Putumayo	SKOR		Orito Airport		00°39′59″N 76°52′36″W	
Orocue	Casanare	SKOE	ORC	Orocue Airport		04°47′25″N 71°20′54″W	
Orocue	Casanare	SKSD		Sardinas Airport	Private	04°59′09″N 71°30′20″W	
Paipa	Boyacá	SKPA	RON	**Juan José Rondón Airport**		05°45′52″N 73°06′21″W	
Paz de Ariporo	Casanare	SKAA		Caño Garza Airport	Private	05°35′30″N 71°35′22″W	
Paz de Ariporo	Casanare	SKPZ	PZA	Paz de Ariporo Airport		05°52′34″N 71°53′18″W	
Pitalito	Huila	SKPI	PTX	**Contador Airport**		01°51′26″N 76°05′08″W	
Plato	Magdalena	SKPL	PLT	Plato Airport (Las Flores Airport)		09°48′04″N 74°47′11″W	
Puerto Berrío	Antioquia	SKPR	PBE	Morela Airport		06°27′36″N 74°24′38″W	
Puerto Bolívar / Uribia	La Guajira	SKPB		Puerto Bolívar Airport (Portete Airport)	Private	12°13′18″N 71°59′03″W	
Puerto Gaitán	Meta	SKMO		Morelía Airport		03°45′01″N 71°27′22″W	
Puerto Gaitán	Meta	SKPG		Puerto Gaitán Airport		04°18′11″N 72°05′08″W	
Puerto Inírida	Guainía	SKPD	PDA	**César Gaviria Trujillo Airport**		03°51′06″N 67°54′18″W	
Puerto Leguízamo	Putumayo	SKLG	LQM	**Caucayá Airport**		00°10′56″S 74°46′15″W	
Puerto Nare	Antioquia	SKPN	NAR	Puerto Nare Airport		06°12′36″N 74°35′27″W	
Quípama	Boyacá	SKFR		Furatena Airport		05°31′20″N 74°10′56″W	
Remedios	Antioquia	SKOT	OTU	Otú Airport		07°00′38″N 74°42′56″W	
Sabana de Torres	Santander	SKRU	SNT	Las Cruces Airport		07°23′00″N 73°30′20″W	
San Gil	Santander	SKSG		**Los Pozos Airport**		06°35′27″N 73°07′44″W	
San Luis de Palenque	Casanare	SKDU		Caño Grande Airport	Private	05°10′21″N 71°08′31″W	
San Luis de Palenque	Casanare		SQE	San Luis de Palenque Airport		05°25′03″N 71°43′51″W	
San Marcos	Sucre	SKSR	SRS	San Marcos Airport		08°41′25″N 75°09′35″W	
Santa Fe de Antioquia	Antioquia	SKSF		Santa Fe de Antioquia Airport	Closed	06°30′05″N 75°49′22″W	
Santa Rosalía	Vichada	SKSL	SSL	Santa Rosalía Airport		05°07′51″N 70°52′06″W	
Sogamoso	Boyacá	SKSO	SOX	Alberto Lleras Camargo Airport		05°40′35″N 72°58′11″W	
Tablón de Tamará	Casanare		TTM	Tablón de Tamará Airport		05°43′36″N 72°06′02″W	
Tapurucuara	Vaupés	SKTP		Tapurucuara Airport		01°28′18″N 70°09′47″W	
Taraira	Vaupés	SKTR		Taraira Airport		00°34′04″N 69°38′17″W	
Tarapacá	Amazonas	SKRA	TCD	**Tarapacá Airport**		02°53′45″S 69°44′59″W	
Tibú	Norte de Santander	SKTB	TIB	**Tibú Airport**		08°37′51″N 72°43′51″W	
Timbiquí	Cauca	SKMB	TBD	**Timbiqui Airport**		02°46′39″N 77°40′03″W	
Tiquié	Vaupés	SKTE		Tiquie Airport		00°14′00″N 70°10′10″W	
Trinidad	Casanare	SKTD	TDA	Trinidad Airport		05°25′50″N 71°39′30″W	
Trinidad / Corocora	Casanare	SKRO		Corocora Airport	Private	05°22′29″N 70°58′41″W	
Tuluá	Valle del Cauca	SKUL	ULQ	Heriberto Gíl Martínez Airport (Farfán Airport)		04°05′40″N 76°13′26″W	
Tunja	Boyacá	SKTJ		Tunja Airport (Gustavo Rojas Pinilla Airport)		05°32′32″N 73°20′39″W	
Turbo	Antioquia	SKTU	TRB	Gonzalo Mejía Airport		08°04′28″N 76°44′28″W	
Uribe	Meta	SKUB	URI	Uribe Airport		03°14′13″N 74°20′47″W	
Urrao	Antioquia	SKUR	URR	Urrao Airport		06°19′35″N 76°08′25″W	
Vigía del Fuerte	Antioquia	SKVF		Vigía del Fuerte Airport		06°34′05″N 76°53′16″W	
Villagarzón	Putumayo	SKVG	VGZ	**Villa Garzón Airport** (Cananguchal Airport)		00°58′43″N 76°36′20″W	
Villanueva	Casanare	SKVN		Villanueva Airport		04°38′14″N 72°56′59″W	
**Military airports**
Buenaventura / Juanchaco	Valle del Cauca	SKJC		Juanchaco Airport		03°56′05″N 77°21′43″W	
Cali	Valle del Cauca	SKGB		Marco Fidel Suárez Air Base		03°27′32″N 76°29′47″W	
Coveñas	Sucre	SKCV	CVE	Coveñas Airport		09°24′04″N 75°41′29″W	
Distracción / Fonseca	La Guajira	SKBN		Buenavista Air Base		10°53′15″N 72°54′03″W	
Larandia	Caquetá	SKLR		Fuerte Militar Larandia		01°28′38″N 75°29′12″W	
Madrid	Cundinamarca	SKMA		Major Justino Mariño Cuesto Air Base		04°43′40″N 74°16′31″W	
Melgar	Tolima	SKME		Lieutenant Colonel Luis F. Pinto Parra Air Base		04°12′59″N 74°38′06″W	
Nilo	Cundinamarca	SKTI		Tolemaida Air Base		04°14′41″N 74°39′00″W	
Palanquero / Puerto Salgar	Cundinamarca	SKPQ	PAL	Captain Germán Olano Moreno Air Base		05°29′00″N 74°39′27″W	
Puerto Boyacá	Boyacá	SKVL	PYA	Velasquez Airport		05°56′19″N 74°27′25″W	
Santa Rita / Marandúa	Vichada	SKUA		Colonel Luis Arturo Rodríguez Meneses Air Base		05°31′35″N 68°40′55″W	
Tres Esquinas	Caquetá	SKTQ	TQS	Captain Ernesto Esguerra Cubides Air Base		00°44′45″N 75°14′03″W	
Villavicencio / Apiay	Meta	SKAP	API	Captain Luis F. Gómez Niño Air Base		04°04′34″N 73°33′46″W	
**Airports with unverified coordinates**
Morichal	Guainía		MHF	Morichal Airport		1°45′00″N 69°55′00″W	
Puerto Lleras	Meta	SKLL		Puerto Lleras Airport		03°17′23″N 73°22′45″W	
San Vicente del Caguán / Yaguara	Caquetá	SKYA	AYG	Yaguara II Airport		01°32′39″N 73°56′00″W	

== Notes ==
- ^1 The served town of Chía is located in Cundinamarca Department, but the airport lies in the Capital District of Bogotá.
- ^2 The served town of Girardot is located in Cundinamarca Department, but the airport lies in the Tolima Department.

== See also ==
- Colombian Aerospace Force (Fuerza Aeroespacial Colombiana)
- Transport in Colombia
- List of airports by ICAO code: S#SK - Colombia
- Wikipedia: WikiProject Aviation/Airline destination lists: South America#Colombia
