= AeroTACA =

Colombian airline, 1996–2006

IATA	ICAO	Call sign
—	ATK	AEROTACA
- Founded: 1965
- Ceased operations: 2006
- Hubs: El Dorado International Airport; Palonegro International Airport
- Destinations: 25
- Headquarters: Bogotá, Colombia
- Founder: Omar Díaz
- Website: www.aerotaca.com

AeroTACA (acronym of AeroTaxi Casanare) was a regional airline based in Bogotá, Colombia. It operated charter flights to neighboring cities from its main base at El Dorado International Airport. It was wholly owned by the Urdaneta family.

== History ==
The airline was established in 1965 as AeroTaxi Casanare by Omar Díaz, based in the city of Yopal. It provided flights to local ranches and settlements in the sparsely connected Llanos region, using a Cessna 206.

On 11 June 1989, one of its planes crashed near the city of Tame when it was unable to land. Six people died, including musician Arnulfo Briceño. After the accident, the airline's facilities were transferred to El Dorado International Airport in Bogotá, and its name was changed to Aerotransportes Casanare. In 1992, the company was authorized to expand its routes to territories that only AIRES covered.

The airline changed its name in 1996 to AeroTACA, with the acquisition of larger aircraft.

Since 2000, the company began to expand throughout the national territory using the Beechcraft 1900C. Following the liquidation of ACES, AeroTACA requested several regional routes to operate upon entering the settlement and signed a technical support contract with Venezuelan Avior Airlines. The company wanted to operate 11 aircraft and cover the entire Colombian territory.

Following the crash of West Caribbean Airways Flight 708 in Venezuela, the Colombian Civil Aviation Authority required that all airlines undergo a special inspection of their maintenance facilities and aircraft. AeroTACA applied for restructuring and went into liquidation by the end of 2006, as it was unable to remain financially stable.

== Destinations ==
AeroTACA operated to the following cities:

Colombia

- Aguachica (Hacaritama Airport)
- Arauca (Santiago Pérez Quiroz Airport)
- Bogotá (El Dorado International Airport) Hub
- Bucaramanga (Palonegro International Airport) Hub
- Cimitarra (Cimitarra Airport)
- Cúcuta (Camilo Daza International Airport)
- Florencia (Gustavo Artunduaga Paredes Airport)
- Ibague (Perales Airport)
- La Pedrera (La Pedrera Airport)
- Malaga (Málaga Airport)
- Mitu (Fabio Alberto León Bentley Airport)
- Neiva (Benito Salas Airport)
- Paz de Ariporo (Paz de Ariporo Airport)
- Puerto Berrio (Morela Airport)
- Sabana de Torres (Las Cruces Airport)
- San Gil (Los Pozos Airport)
- San José del Guaviare (Jorge Enrique González Torres Airport)
- Santa Rosa del Sur (Gabriel Antonio Caro Aerodrome)
- Saravena (Los Colonizadores Airport)
- Sogamoso (Alberto Lleras Camargo Airport)
- Tame (Gabriel Vargas Santos Airport)
- Tauramena (Tauramena Airport)
- Villanueva (Villanueva Airport)
- Villavicencio (La Vanguardia Airport)
- Yopal (El Alcaraván Airport)

== Fleet ==
AeroTACA's fleet included the following aircraft:

- Beechcraft King Air C90B
- Beechcraft 1900C
- Cessna 206
- Cessna 404 Titan
- de Havilland Canada DHC-6 Twin Otter
- Fairchild Hiller FH-227
- Piper PA-28
- Piper PA-32
- Saab 340B

== See also ==
- List of airlines of Colombia
