= Aerocóndor Colombia =

1955–1980 airline in Colombia

Aerocóndor Colombia (Aerovías Cóndor de Colombia)
IATA	ICAO	Call sign
OD	-	AEROCÓNDOR
- Founded: February 3, 1955
- Commenced operations: October 7, 1955
- Ceased operations: June 16, 1980
- Hubs: Soledad International Airport
- Secondary hubs: El Dorado International Airport
- Fleet size: 34
- Destinations: 28
- Headquarters: Barranquilla, Colombia

Aerocóndor Colombia (legally Aerovías Cóndor de Colombia S.A.) was a Colombian airline headquartered in Barranquilla, Colombia.

== History ==
=== Early operations ===
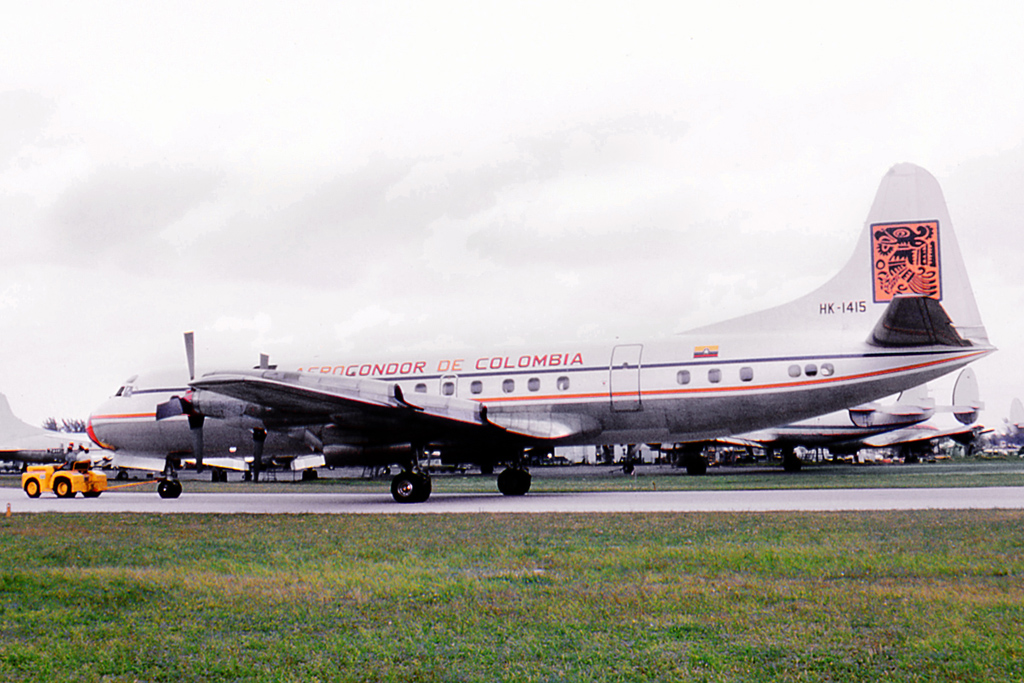
An Aerocóndor Lockheed L-188 at Miami International Airport in 1970

Aerocóndor Colombia was founded by six former LANSA and Avianca pilots; Gustavo Lopez, Luis Donado, Eduardo Gonzalez, Juan B. Millon, Captain Julio Martin Florez, and Enrique Hanaberg, in association with two businessmen who together perceived an opportunity to establish a new airline to fly cargo from Colombia's northern industrial city of Barranquilla throughout the republic. Scheduled cargo services commenced on October 7, 1955 using Curtiss C-46s which were later complemented with Douglas C-47s. Progressive expansion saw most of these aircraft later reconfigured for passenger services, and Douglas C-54 and DC-6 were acquired during the early 1960s. International services between Barranquilla and Miami commenced during 1963. On May 1, 1969, the airline began re-equipping with L-188 Electras acquired from American Airlines. The Electras gradually replaced the airline's fleet of classic piston engine aircraft in the early 1970s.

=== Jet operations ===
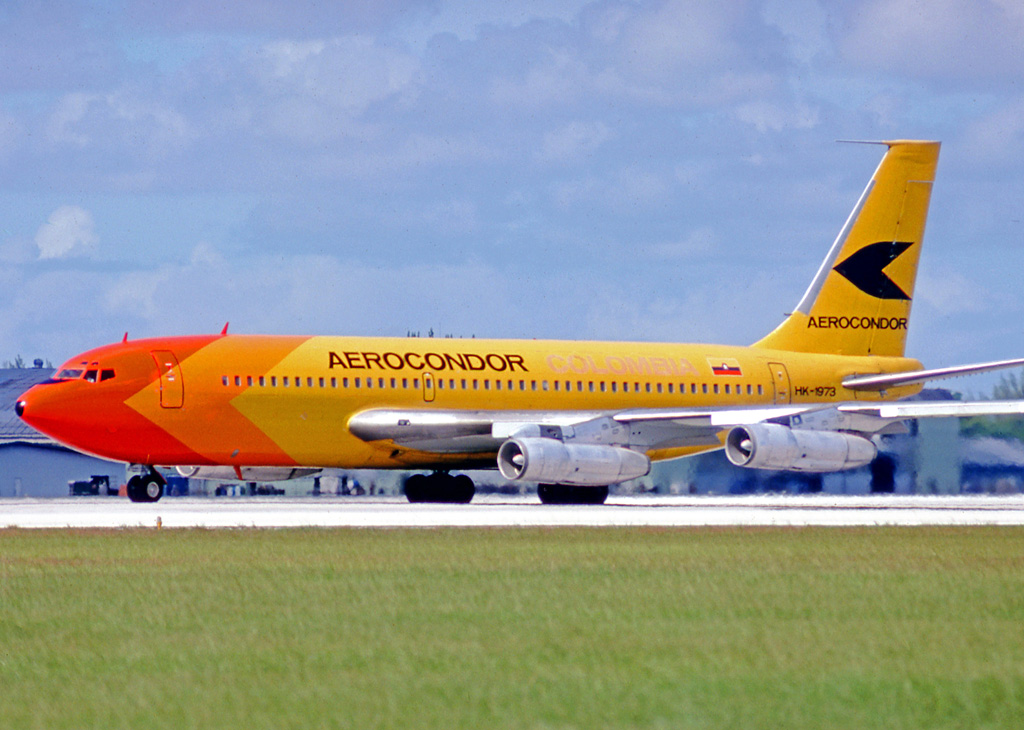
An Aerocóndor Boeing 720B at Miami International Airport in 1975

Aerocóndor entered the jet age in December of 1972, purchasing an ex-American Airlines Boeing 720B. A Canadair CC-106 Yukon was also acquired for freight services in 1972 and a second ex-American Boeing 720B was added to the fleet in 1974. Introduction of jetliners modernized the airline's image and enabled it to begin operating jet services to Aruba, Curaçao, Guatemala City, Santo Domingo, Panama City, and Port-au-Prince whilst also increasing the frequency of Miami services from Medellín, Bogotá, and San Andrés. In 1975, financial control of Aerocóndor passed from the company's foundation management to Jorge Barco Vargas, formerly an Aerocivil chairman and the brother of a former president of the republic. A new orange and yellow colour scheme was applied to some aircraft, including the Boeing 720s, from 1975.

In 1977, the airline entered the wide-body era when it acquired a factory fresh Airbus A300, named "Ciudad de Barranquilla" in honor of the company's port of origin. This was the first A300 operated within the Latin American region, entering service on highly competitive routes to Miami. Plans for the introduction of a second A300 failed to materialize due to fiscal underachievement under the airline's new management. The financially strapped carrier soon entered a period of major crisis, due to poor control and internal corruption rather than market forces.

=== Decline ===
The company entered into a financial crisis due to the delay of four monthly payments for the A300, which forced the company to return the aircraft to Airbus. Aerocóndor was again sold in 1979 to the Cotes and Calderon brothers. The new president of the airline managed to overcome the crisis and recover the wide body aircraft. However, the financial state declined and the company was again in crisis. On April 24, 1980, liquidation was ordered and Aerocóndor ceased operations on June 16, 1980. Hope remained that services would be reinstated, but negotiations between the pilots, liquidators and the Colombian government were unsuccessful. Over the years, several of the pensioners of the airline had protested countless times demanding payment, overdue since the liquidation of the company. The airline's B707s and B720s were eventually stricken from the Colombian civil air register.

== Destinations ==
=== National ===
- Colombia
  - Barranquilla (Soledad International Airport) Hub
  - Barrancabermeja (Yariguíes Airport)
  - Bogotá (El Dorado International Airport) Hub
  - Cali (Alfonso Bonilla Aragón International Airport)
  - Cartagena (Rafael Núñez International Airport)
  - Cimitarra (Cimitarra Airport)
  - Cúcuta (Camilo Daza International Airport)
  - Ibague (Perales Airport)
  - Maicao (Jorge Isaacs Airport)
  - Mariquita (Mariquita Airport)
  - Medellín (Enrique Olaya Herrera Airport)
  - Neiva (Benito Salas Airport)
  - Pereira (Matecaña International Airport)
  - Riohacha (Almirante Padilla Airport)
  - San Andrés (Gustavo Rojas Pinilla International Airport)
  - Santa Marta (Simon Bolivar International Airport)
  - Tibú (Tibú Airport)
  - Tolú (Golfo de Morrosquillo Airport)
  - Turbo (Gonzalo Mejía Airport)
  - Valledupar (Alfonso López Pumarejo Airport)
  - Velázquez (Velasquez Airport)

=== International ===
- Aruba
  - Oranjestad (Queen Beatrix International Airport)
- Curaçao
  - Willemstad (Curaçao International Airport)
- Dominican Republic
  - Santo Domingo (Las Américas International Airport)
- Guatemala
  - Guatemala City (La Aurora International Airport)
- Haiti
  - Puerto Príncipe (Toussaint Louverture International Airport)
- Panama
  - Panama City (Tocumen International Airport)
- United States
  - Miami (Miami International Airport)

== Fleet ==
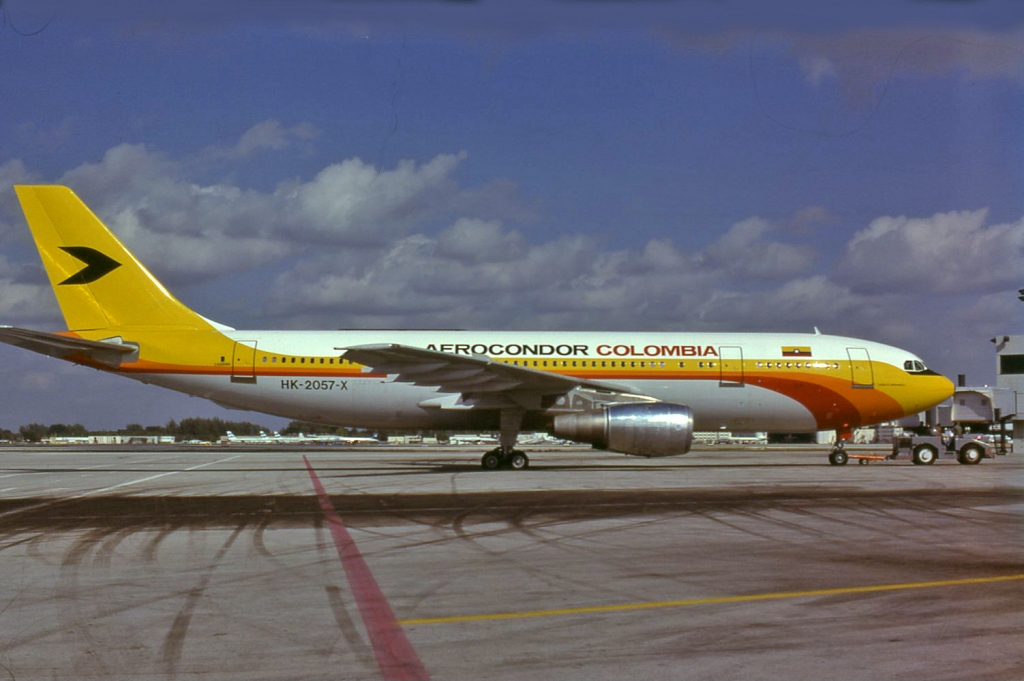
Aerocóndor's only Airbus A300B4 parked at San Francisco International Airport in 1978

Aerocóndor Colombia operated the following aircraft types at various times over the years:

Aerocóndor Colombia fleet
Aircraft	Total	Introduced	Retired	Notes
Airbus A300B4	1	1977	1979	First A300 operator in South America
Boeing 707-120	3	1975	1979	
Boeing 720B	2	1972	1980	
Canadair CC-106 Yukon	1	1974	1975	
Cessna 180 Skywagon	1	Unknown	Unknown	
Cessna T-50	2	Unknown	Unknown	
Curtiss C-46 Commando	7	1955	1979	Four in operation 1965
De Havilland Canada DHC-2 Beaver	1	Unknown	Unknown	
Douglas C-47 Skytrain	2	Unknown	1978	
Douglas C-54 Skymaster	3	1964	1969	Two in operation 1965
Douglas DC-3	1	1965	1965	
Douglas DC-6	3	1963	1971	One in operation 1965
Douglas DC-8-33F	1	1979	1980	Leased from Intercontinental Airways
Lockheed L-188A Electra	7	1969	1979	
Lockheed L-1649A Starliner	1	1966	1966	

== Accidents and incidents ==
- On December 18, 1966, a Lockheed L-1649A Starliner (registered N7301C), hit 10 to 20 meters from the runway on its flight from Miami to Bogotá. At the time of the accident, there were clouds of fog over parts of the airport. The captain of the aircraft leased from the USA did not have a valid certificate of fitness to fly. Of the 59 people on board, 17 died.
- On March 16, 1969, a Douglas DC-6 (registered HK-754) was hijacked by a passenger shortly after takeoff from Gustavo Rojas Pinilla International Airport. The hijacker demanded the pilot to be flown to Cuba and diverted the plane to Ignacio Agramonte International Airport.
- On August 27, 1973, a Lockheed L-188A Electra (registered HK-777) was destroyed when it flew into the side of the Cerro el Cable mountain shortly after takeoff from El Dorado International Airport. All 36 passengers and 6 crew members died.
- On February 22, 1975, a Canadair CC-106 Yukon (registered HK-1972) hit a tree 10 kilometers from the departure of El Dorado International Airport and fell 1,200 meters further into a mountain. All five crew members of the cargo plane were killed.
- On July 10, 1975, a Lockheed L-188A Electra (registered HK-1976) suddenly turned right shortly after taking off from El Dorado International Airport, sank back and crashed into an Aerocosta Douglas DC-6 (HK-756). Both planes caught fire and were destroyed. Two of the four crew members on board the Electra were killed.

== See also ==
- List of defunct airlines of Colombia
