= El Charco Airport =

- IATA: ECR; ICAO: SKEH; LID: SK-360

Summary
- Airport type: Public
- Elevation AMSL: 25 ft (7.6 m)
- Coordinates: 2°27′00″N 78°05′40″W

Map
- Location of the airport in Colombia

Runways
Direction	Length		Surface
Direction	m	ft	Surface
16/34	900	2,953	Grass
- Sources: GCM Google Maps

El Charco Airport (IATA: ECR, ICAO: SKEH) is an airport serving the Tapaje River town of El Charco in the Nariño Department of Colombia. The runway parallels the river, 3 kilometres (1.9 mi) upstream of the town.

== See also ==
- Transport in Colombia
- List of airports in Colombia
