= Cravo Norte Airport =

- IATA: RAV; ICAO: SKCN

Summary
- Airport type: Public
- Serves: Cravo Norte, Colombia
- Elevation AMSL: 336 ft / 102 m
- Coordinates: 6°19′00″N 70°12′40″W

Map
- Location of the airport in Colombia

Runways
Direction	Length		Surface
Direction	m	ft	Surface
05/23	1,000	3,281	Asphalt
- Sources: GCM Google Maps

Cravo Norte Airport (IATA: RAV, ICAO: SKCN) is an airport serving the Casanare River town of Cravo Norte in the Arauca Department of Colombia.

The airport is 1 kilometre (0.62 mi) north of the town. The runway has an additional 122 metres (400 ft) of overrun on the northeast end.

== See also ==
- Transport in Colombia
- List of airports in Colombia
