= Cruz Verde Airport =

- IATA: none; ICAO: SKCE; LID: SK-407

Summary
- Airport type: Public
- Serves: Ibagué, Colombia
- Elevation AMSL: 3,039 ft / 926 m
- Coordinates: 4°23′25″N 75°07′52″W

Map
- Location of the airport in Colombia

Runways
Direction	Length		Surface
Direction	m	ft	Surface
14/32	625	2,051	Asphalt
- Sources: OurAirports

Cruz Verde Airport (ICAO: SKCE) is an airport serving the city of Ibagué, in the Tolima Department of Colombia. The runway is 3.5 kilometres (2.2 mi) south of Perales Airport, the city's main airport, and runs alongside Picaleña Avenue (Avenida Picaleña).

== See also ==
- Transport in Colombia
- List of airports in Colombia
