= Colonel Luis Arturo Rodríguez Meneses Air Base =

Colonel Luis Arturo Rodríguez Meneses Air Base Base Aérea Coronel Luis Arturo Rodríguez Meneses
- IATA: none; ICAO: SKUA

Summary
- Airport type: Military
- Operator: Colombian Aerospace Force
- Location: Marandúa / Santa Rita, Colombia
- Elevation AMSL: 87 m (285 ft)
- Coordinates: 5°31′28″N 68°41′08″W

Map
- Location of the airport in Colombia

Runways
Direction	Length		Surface
Direction	m	ft	Surface
07/25	2,067	6,780	Asphalt
- Source: WAD GCM Google Maps

Colonel Luis Arturo Rodríguez Meneses Air Base (Spanish: Base Aérea Coronel Luis Arturo Rodríguez Meneses) (ICAO: SKUA) is a Colombian military base assigned to the Colombian Aerospace Force (Fuerza Aeroespacial Colombiana or FAC) Eastern Air Group (Grupo Aéreo del Oriente or GAORI). The base is located in Marandúa, near Santa Rita, in the Vichada department of Colombia. It is named in honor of Colonel Luis Arturo Rodríguez Meneses.

== Facilities ==
The air base resides at an elevation of 285 feet (87 m) above mean sea level. It has one runway designated 07/25 with an asphalt surface measuring 6,780 by 145 feet (2,067 m × 44 m). There is also a closed grass runway designated 03/21 which measures 8,110 by 100 feet (2,472 m × 30 m).

== See also ==
- Transport in Colombia
- List of airports in Colombia
