= Mapiripán Airport =

- IATA: none; ICAO: SKIR; LID: SK-325

Summary
- Airport type: Public
- Serves: Mapiripán, Colombia
- Elevation AMSL: 730 ft / 223 m
- Coordinates: 2°53′50″N 72°08′27″W

Map
- Location of the airport in Colombia

Runways
Direction	Length		Surface
Direction	m	ft	Surface
16/34	1,175	3,855	Grass
- Sources: OurAirports Google Maps

Mapiripán Airport (ICAO: SKMF) is an airport serving the town of Mapiripán, in the Meta Department of Colombia. The runway and town are on the north bank of the Guaviare River, which is locally the border between the Meta and Guaviare Departments.

== See also ==
- Transport in Colombia
- List of airports in Colombia
