= Juradó Airport =

- IATA: JUO; ICAO: SKJU

Summary
- Airport type: Public
- Serves: Juradó, Colombia
- Elevation AMSL: 33 ft / 10 m
- Coordinates: 7°04′25″N 77°43′45″W

Map
- Location of the airport in Colombia

Runways
Direction	Length		Surface
Direction	m	ft	Surface
13/31	785	2,575	Grass
- Sources: GCM Bing Maps

Juradó Airport (IATA: JUO, ICAO: SKJU) is an airstrip serving Juradó, a Pacific coastal village and municipality in the Chocó Department of Colombia.

The airstrip parallels the shoreline just inland from the water. It is 5 kilometres (3.1 mi) southeast of Juradó.

== Accidents and incidents ==
- On January 8, 2025, a Cessna 402C operated by Pacifica Aviation (officially Pacifica de Aviación) carrying ten people (two crew, eight passengers) flying from Juradó Airport to Medellín-Enrique Olaya Herrera Airport in Colombia crashed into a wooded mountainside, killing all on board.

== See also ==
- Transport in Colombia
- List of airports in Colombia
