= Santiago Vila Airport =

Santiago Vila Airport Aeropuerto Santiago Vila
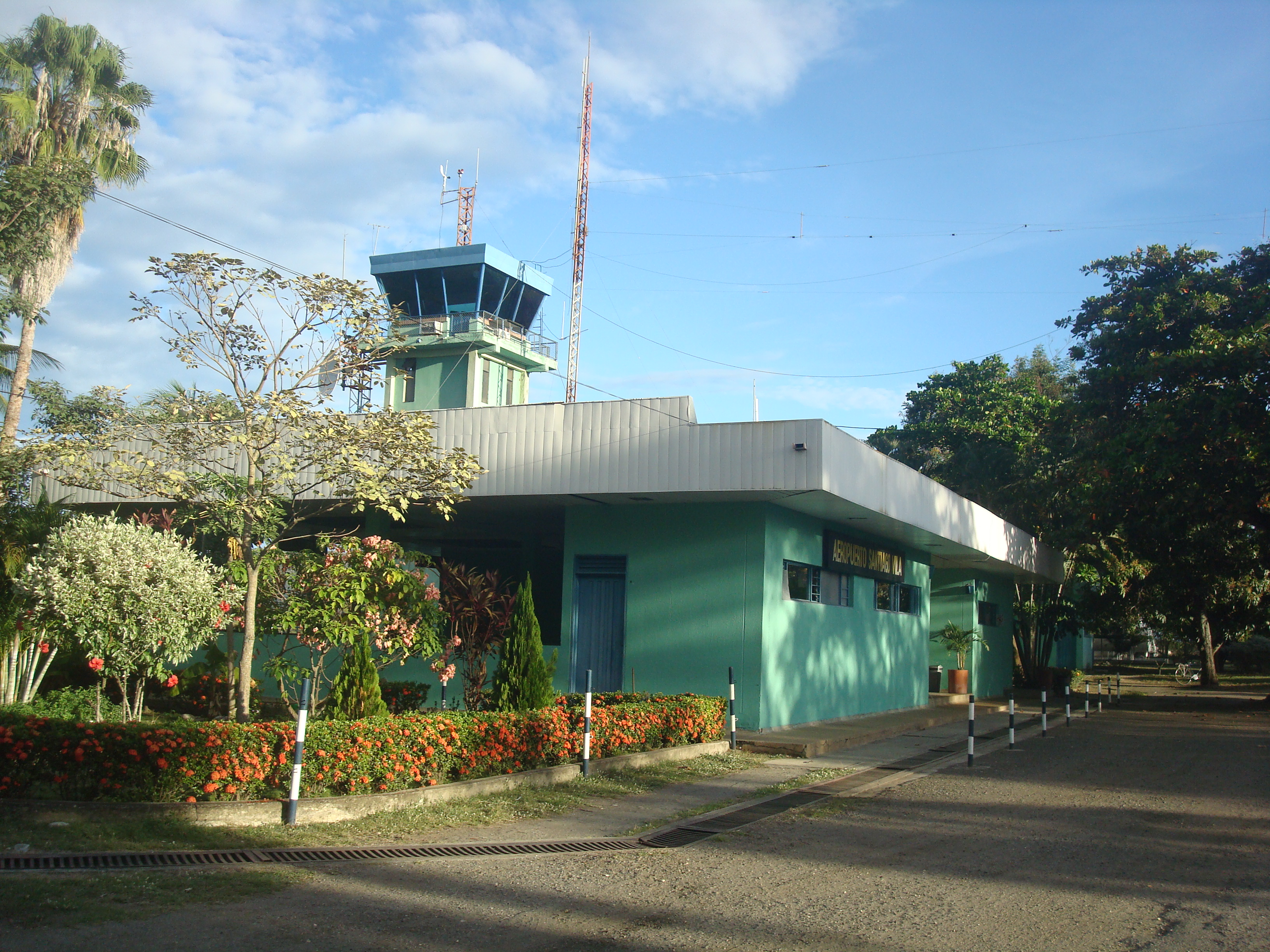
- IATA: GIR; ICAO: SKGI

Summary
- Airport type: Public
- Serves: Girardot, Colombia
- Location: Flandes, Colombia
- Elevation AMSL: 902 ft (275 m)
- Coordinates: 4°16′35″N 74°47′46″W

Map
- Location of the airport in Colombia

Runways
Direction	Length		Surface
Direction	m	ft	Surface
02/20	1,600	5,249	Asphalt

Statistics (2009)
- Passenger movements: 823
- Cargo movement (T): 28
- Aircraft operations: 30,689
- Sources: Aerocivil, WAD GCM Google Maps

Santiago Vila Airport (Spanish: Aeropuerto Santiago Vila) (IATA: GIR, ICAO: SKGI) is an airport serving Girardot, a city in the Cundinamarca Department of Colombia. The airport is 3.1 kilometres (2 mi) south of Girardot, across the Magdalena River by the town of Flandes in the Tolima Department.

The Girardot VOR-DME (Ident: GIR) is 6.5 nautical miles (12.0 km) southwest of the airport.

== Airlines and destinations ==
Airlines	Destinations
SATENA	Bogotá

== Accidents and incidents ==
On 12 December 1982, Douglas C-47A HK-2580 of Transportes Aéreas Latinamericas crashed at Santiago Vila Airport while on a training flight destined to land at Mariquita Airport. One of the four people on board was killed.

== See also ==
- Transport in Colombia
- List of airports in Colombia
