= General Navas Pardo Airport =

General Navas Pardo Airport Chaparral Airport
- IATA: CPL; ICAO: SKHA

Summary
- Airport type: Public
- Serves: Chaparral, Colombia
- Elevation AMSL: 2,730 ft / 832 m
- Coordinates: 3°43′28″N 75°27′55″W

Map
- Location of the airport in Colombia

Runways
Direction	Length		Surface
Direction	m	ft	Surface
09/27	1,205	3,953	Asphalt
- Sources: GCM SkyVector

General Navas Pardo Airport (IATA: CPL, ICAO: SKHA) is an airport serving the town of Chaparral in the Tolima Department of Colombia. The runway is on the east side of the town. There is mountainous terrain west through northeast of the airport, and rising terrain to the southwest and south.

== See also ==
- Transport in Colombia
- List of airports in Colombia
