= Cicuco Airport =

Airport in Colombia

- IATA: none; ICAO: SKIO

Summary
- Airport type: Public
- Serves: Cicuco, Colombia
- Elevation AMSL: 65 ft / 20 m
- Coordinates: 9°16′10″N 74°39′05″W

Map
- Location of the airport in Colombia

Runways
Direction	Length		Surface
Direction	m	ft	Surface
06/24	1,400	4,593	Asphalt (deteriorated)
- Sources: GCM SkyVector

Cicuco Airport (ICAO: SKIO) is an airport serving the town of Cicuco in the Bolívar Department of Colombia. The airport is near the Ciénega El Medio, an arm of the Magdalena River.

== See also ==
- Transport in Colombia
- List of airports in Colombia
