= Taraira Airport =

- IATA: none; ICAO: SKTR; LID: SK-499

Summary
- Airport type: Public
- Serves: Taraira, Colombia
- Elevation AMSL: 492 ft / 150 m
- Coordinates: 0°34′05″S 69°38′20″W

Map
- Location of the airport in Colombia

Runways
Direction	Length		Surface
Direction	m	ft	Surface
07/25	1,200	3,937	Gravel
- Source: OurAirports Google Maps

Taraira Airport (ICAO: SKTR) is an airport serving the town of Taraira in the Vaupés Department of Colombia. The runway is adjacent to and running southwest from the town. The town and airport are 4 kilometres (2.5 mi) west of the Brazilian border.

== See also ==
- Transport in Colombia
- List of airports in Colombia
