= Uribe Airport =

- IATA: URI; ICAO: SKUB; LID: SK-354

Summary
- Airport type: Public
- Serves: La Uribe, Colombia
- Elevation AMSL: 2,750 ft / 838 m
- Coordinates: 3°14′15″N 74°20′50″W

Map
- Location of the airport in Colombia

Runways
Direction	Length		Surface
Direction	m	ft	Surface
12/30	1,175	3,855	Gravel
- Sources: GCM Google Maps

Uribe Airport (IATA: URI, ICAO: SKUB) is an airport serving the town of La Uribe, in the Meta Department of Colombia. The runway and town are on the northern bank of the small Duda River, a tributary of the Guayabero River. High terrain exists north and west.

== See also ==
- Transport in Colombia
- List of airports in Colombia
