= Puerto Nare Airport =

- IATA: NAR; ICAO: SKPN

Summary
- Airport type: Public
- Serves: Puerto Nare, Colombia
- Elevation AMSL: 479 ft / 146 m
- Coordinates: 6°12′35″N 74°35′28″W

Map

Runways
Direction	Length		Surface
Direction	m	ft	Surface
06/24	1,010	3,314	Asphalt
- Source: GCM Google Maps

Puerto Nare Airport (IATA: NAR, ICAO: SKPN) is an airport serving the river town of Puerto Nare in the Antioquia Department of Colombia.

The airport is at the confluence of the Samaná Norte River into the Magdalena River, 2.5 kilometres (1.6 mi) north of the town. Runway length does not include a 90 metres (300 ft) paved overrun on the east end.

== See also ==
- Transport in Colombia
- List of airports in Colombia
