= Tapaje River =

Watercourse in Colombia

- Location of mouth

Location
- Country: Colombia

Physical characteristics
- Mouth
  - location: Pacific Ocean
  - coordinates: 2°38′42″N 78°06′51″W

The Tapaje River is a river which flows through Colombia. It empties into the Pacific Ocean.

An 1853 watercolor by Manuel María Paz (1820−1902) depicts three Indians by the Tapaje River, located in what was then the Province of Barbacoas: a boy fashioning a clay pot, a boy holding a commercially manufactured clay bottle, and an adult woman holding a paddle.

In 2007, Afro-Colombian human rights activists requested assistance and protection for "Afro-Colombian communities in the Tapaje River" due to "recent combat operations between the Colombian Naval Forces of the Pacific, paramilitaries, and the Revolutionary Armed Forces of Colombia (FARC)." "Several hundred families were displaced," according to the Pulitzer Center on Crisis Reporting, and over 7,200 people fled to El Charco, a "small port town" located "at the mouth of the Tapaje River", according to a report from the United Nations High Commissioner for Refugees.

== See also ==
- List of rivers of Colombia
