= Garzón Airport =

La Jagua Airport Garzón Airport
- IATA: none; ICAO: SKGZ

Summary
- Airport type: Public
- Serves: Garzón, Colombia
- Elevation AMSL: 2,620 ft / 799 m
- Coordinates: 2°08′45″N 75°41′40″W

Map
- Location of the airport in Colombia

Runways
Direction	Length		Surface
Direction	m	ft	Surface
05/23	1,530	5,020	Grass
- Sources: GCM HERE Maps

La Jagua Airport (ICAO: SKGZ) is an airport serving the town of Garzón, in the Huila Department of Colombia. The airport is 8 kilometres (5.0 mi) southwest of the town, near the village of La Jagua.

== See also ==
- Transport in Colombia
- List of airports in Colombia
