= Carimagua Airport =

- IATA: CCO; ICAO: SKCI

Summary
- Airport type: Public
- Serves: Carimagua, Colombia
- Elevation AMSL: 700 ft / 213 m
- Coordinates: 4°34′00″N 71°20′10″W

Map
- Location of the airport in Colombia

Runways
Direction	Length		Surface
Direction	m	ft	Surface
04/22	1,200	3,937	Asphalt
- Sources: GCM Google Maps

Carimagua Airport (IATA: CCO, ICAO: SKCI) is an airport serving the village of Carimagua in the Meta Department of Colombia. The runway is 24 kilometres (15 mi) south of Orocué, the nearest town.

The Carimauga non-directional beacon (Ident: CRG) is located on the field.

== See also ==
- Transport in Colombia
- List of airports in Colombia
