= El Carmen de Bolívar Airport =

Carmen de Bolívar Airport Montemariano Airport
- IATA: none; ICAO: SKCB

Summary
- Airport type: Public
- Serves: El Carmen de Bolívar, Colombia
- Elevation AMSL: 590 ft / 180 m
- Coordinates: 9°41′00″N 75°07′23″W

Map
- Location of the airport in Colombia

Runways
Direction	Length		Surface
Direction	m	ft	Surface
22/04	1,500	4,921	Grass
- Sources: GCM Google Maps

Carmen de Bolívar Airport, also called Montemariano Airport (ICAO: SKCB) is an airport serving the town of El Carmen de Bolívar and the Montes de Maria subregion, in the Bolívar Department of Colombia. The airport is 3 kilometres (1.9 mi) south of the town. It was conceived by Mr. José Luís Salcedo Padrón and Mr. Juan Federico Holman. In the 1930s it was called José Luis Salcedo Airport. In 2017, together with resources from the national level and the government of Bolívar, work began on its reconstruction after several decades of use by the guerrillas. During the government of President Iván Duque, the works that allowed its reopening were completed.

== See also ==
- Transport in Colombia
- List of airports in Colombia
