= Buenavista Air Base =

Buenavista Airport
- IATA: none; ICAO: SKBN; LID: BVA

Summary
- Airport type: Public/Military
- Serves: Distracción, Colombia
- Location: Buenavista
- Elevation AMSL: 850 ft / 259 m
- Coordinates: 10°53′20″N 72°54′00″W

Map
- Location of the airport in Colombia

Runways
Direction	Length		Surface
Direction	m	ft	Surface
03/21	1,510	4,954	Asphalt
- Sources: GCM Google Maps

Buenavista Airport (ICAO: SKBN) is an airport serving the towns of Fonseca and Distracción in the La Guajira Department of Colombia. The runway is 1.5 kilometres (0.93 mi) southwest of Distracción.

== See also ==
- Transport in Colombia
- List of airports in Colombia
