= 1973 Aerocóndor Lockheed L-188 Electra crash =

Lockheed L-188 Electra accident

1973 Aerocóndor L-188 Electra crash
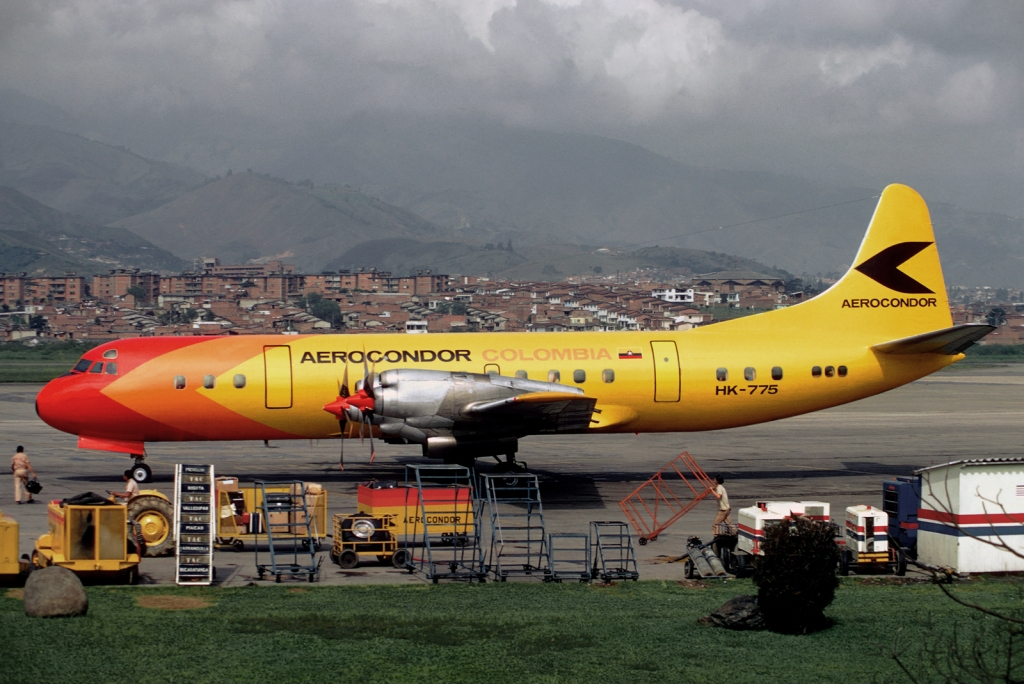
- An Aerocóndor Colombia L-188 Electra, similar to the accident aircraft

Accident
- Date: 27 August 1973
- Summary: Controlled flight into terrain
- Site: 12km southeast from Bogotá-Eldorado Airport, Eastern Hills, Bogotá, Colombia

Aircraft
- Aircraft type: Lockheed L-188A Electra
- Operator: Aerocóndor Colombia
- Registration: HK-777
- Flight origin: Bogotá-Eldorado Airport, Bogotá, Colombia
- 1st stopover: Rafael Núñez International Airport, Cartagena, Colombia
- Last stopover: Ernesto Cortissoz International Airport, Barranquilla, Colombia
- Destination: Gustavo Rojas Pinilla International Airport, San Andrés, Colombia
- Occupants: 42
- Passengers: 36
- Crew: 6
- Fatalities: 42
- Survivors: 0

The 1973 Aerocóndor L-188 Electra crash occurred on 27 August 1973, when a Lockheed L-188 Electra operated by Aerocóndor Colombia, struck a mountain after takeoff. All of the 42 occupants on board were killed, leaving no survivors.

== Aircraft ==
The aircraft was a Lockheed L-188A Electra, registered HK-777, manufactured in Burbank, California, United States. Its first flight was on 22 December 1959, with delivery to American Airlines on 31 December 1959, with registration N6125A. It operated with American Airlines until it was sold to Aerocóndor in April 1969.

== Accident ==
After taking off from Bogotá-Eldorado Airport, Colombia, in limited visibility, the crew failed to follow correct departure procedures and the aircraft crashed into the side of Cerro el Cable mountain, approximately 12 kilometres (7.5 mi) southeast of the airport. The aircraft immediately disintegrated after the impact, killing everyone on board.
