= Yariguíes Airport =

Yariguíes Airport Aeropuerto Yariguíes
- IATA: EJA; ICAO: SKEJ

Summary
- Airport type: Public
- Operator: Aerocivil
- Location: Barrancabermeja, Santander, Colombia
- Opened: 1957
- Elevation AMSL: 397 ft / 121 m
- Coordinates: 7°01′28″N 73°48′25″W

Map
- Location of airport in Colombia

Runways
| Direction | Length | | Surface |
| Direction | m | ft | Surface |
|---|---|---|---|
| 04/22 | 1,800 | 5,906 | Asphalt |
- Sources: Airports WW GCM

Yariguíes Airport (Spanish: Aeropuerto Yariguíes, IATA: EJA, ICAO: SKEJ) is an airport serving Barrancabermeja, a city in the Santander Department of Colombia. The airport is 6 kilometres (3.7 mi) southeast of the city.

The airport was renovated in 2013 at a cost of $13 million pesos. Colombian president Juan Manuel Santos visited the airport to inaugurate the completed renovations.

== Airlines and destinations ==
| Airlines | Destinations |
|---|---|
| Avianca | Bogotá |
| Clic | Bogotá |

== Climate ==
Yariguíes Airport has a tropical monsoon climate (Am) with heavy rainfall in all months except January.

Climate data for Yariguíes Airport
| Month | Jan | Feb | Mar | Apr | May | Jun | Jul | Aug | Sep | Oct | Nov | Dec | Year |
|---|---|---|---|---|---|---|---|---|---|---|---|---|---|
| Mean daily maximum °C (°F) | 32.8 (91.0) | 33.1 (91.6) | 32.6 (90.7) | 32.0 (89.6) | 31.8 (89.2) | 32.0 (89.6) | 32.4 (90.3) | 32.4 (90.3) | 31.7 (89.1) | 31.1 (88.0) | 31.2 (88.2) | 31.7 (89.1) | 32.1 (89.7) |
| Daily mean °C (°F) | 28.2 (82.8) | 28.4 (83.1) | 28.2 (82.8) | 27.8 (82.0) | 27.6 (81.7) | 27.7 (81.9) | 27.8 (82.0) | 27.7 (81.9) | 27.3 (81.1) | 27.0 (80.6) | 27.2 (81.0) | 27.6 (81.7) | 27.7 (81.9) |
| Mean daily minimum °C (°F) | 23.6 (74.5) | 23.8 (74.8) | 23.8 (74.8) | 23.7 (74.7) | 23.5 (74.3) | 23.4 (74.1) | 23.2 (73.8) | 23.1 (73.6) | 22.9 (73.2) | 23.0 (73.4) | 23.3 (73.9) | 23.5 (74.3) | 23.4 (74.1) |
| Average rainfall mm (inches) | 51.1 (2.01) | 124.8 (4.91) | 183.1 (7.21) | 299.9 (11.81) | 373.7 (14.71) | 268.1 (10.56) | 229.6 (9.04) | 288.5 (11.36) | 338.4 (13.32) | 408.4 (16.08) | 303.1 (11.93) | 132.0 (5.20) | 3,000.7 (118.14) |
| Average rainy days | 6 | 10 | 14 | 19 | 21 | 18 | 17 | 20 | 21 | 21 | 18 | 11 | 196 |
| Average relative humidity (%) | 74 | 73 | 77 | 81 | 82 | 81 | 78 | 79 | 81 | 83 | 83 | 80 | 79 |
| Mean monthly sunshine hours | 223.2 | 177.9 | 155.0 | 147.0 | 167.4 | 177.0 | 210.8 | 204.6 | 183.0 | 167.4 | 168.0 | 189.1 | 2,170.4 |
| Mean daily sunshine hours | 7.2 | 6.3 | 5.0 | 4.9 | 5.4 | 5.9 | 6.8 | 6.6 | 6.1 | 5.4 | 5.6 | 6.1 | 5.9 |

== Accidents and incidents ==
- On 21 May 1970, a Douglas DC-3 of Avianca was hijacked to Yariguíes Airport whilst on a flight from El Alcaraván Airport, Yopal to Alberto Lleras Camargo Airport, Sogamoso. The hijackers had demanded to be taken to Cuba.

== See also ==
- Transport in Colombia
- List of airports in Colombia
