= Trinidad Airport =

- IATA: TDA; ICAO: SKTD

Summary
- Airport type: Public
- Serves: Trinidad, Colombia
- Elevation AMSL: 650 ft / 198 m
- Coordinates: 5°25′50″N 71°39′30″W

Map
- Location of the airport in Colombia

Runways
Direction	Length		Surface
Direction	m	ft	Surface
05/23	1,260	4,134	Grass
- Source: GCM Google Maps

Trinidad Airport (IATA: TDA, ICAO: SKTD) is an airport serving Trinidad, a town and municipality in the oil and gas-producing Casanare Department of Colombia. The runway is 1.6 kilometres (0.99 mi) north of the town.

== See also ==
- Transport in Colombia
- List of airports in Colombia
