= Tarapacá Airport =

- IATA: TCD; ICAO: SKRA

Summary
- Airport type: Public
- Serves: Tarapacá, Colombia
- Elevation AMSL: 253 ft / 77 m
- Coordinates: 2°53′41″S 69°44′50″W

Map

Runways
Direction	Length		Surface
Direction	m	ft	Surface
07/25	1,075	3,527	Asphalt
- Source: GCM Google Maps

Tarapacá Airport (IATA: TCD, ICAO: SKRA) is an airport serving Tarapacá, a town and municipality in the Amazonas Department of Colombia. The town is on the west bank of the Putumayo River, 4 kilometres (2.5 mi) from the Brazilian border. The runway is just west of the town.

The ICAO code "SKRA" may not be active.

== Airlines and destinations ==
Airlines	Destinations
SATENA	Leticia

== See also ==
- Transport in Colombia
- List of airports in Colombia
