= Urrao Airport =

Urrao Airport Alí Piedrahita Airport
- IATA: URR; ICAO: SKUR

Summary
- Airport type: Public
- Serves: Urrao
- Elevation AMSL: 6,090 ft / 1,856 m
- Coordinates: 6°19′35″N 76°08′25″W

Map

Runways
Direction	Length		Surface
Direction	m	ft	Surface
15/33	915	3,002	Asphalt
- Sources: GCM

Urrao Airport (IATA: URR, ICAO: SKUR) is an airport serving Urrao, a town in the Antioquia Department of Colombia. The runway and town are in an elevated mountain valley on the eastern bank of the small Penderisco River, an eventual tributary of the Atrato River.

== See also ==
- Transport in Colombia
- List of airports in Colombia
