= Tapurucuara Airport =

- IATA: none; ICAO: SKTP; LID: SK-498

Summary
- Airport type: Public
- Serves: Tapurucuara, Colombia
- Elevation AMSL: 621 ft / 189 m
- Coordinates: 1°28′18″N 70°09′50″W

Map
- Location of the airport in Colombia

Runways
Direction	Length		Surface
Direction	m	ft	Surface
08/26	650	2,133	Dirt
10/28	600	1,969	Dirt
- Sources: OurAirports Bing Maps

Tapurucuara Airport (ICAO: SKTP) is an airport serving the Querari River village of Tapurucuara in the Vaupés Department of Colombia.

== See also ==
- Transport in Colombia
- List of airports in Colombia
