= Tablón de Tamará Airport =

- IATA: TTM; ICAO: none; LID: SK-129

Summary
- Airport type: Public
- Serves: Tablón de Tamará, Colombia
- Elevation AMSL: 1,605 ft / 489 m
- Coordinates: 5°43′35″N 72°06′02″W

Map
- Location of the airport in Colombia

Runways
Direction	Length		Surface
Direction	m	ft	Surface
01/19	1,360	4,462	Grass
- Source: GCM Google Maps

Tablón de Tamará Airport (IATA: TTM) is an airport serving the village of Tablón de Tamará in the Casanare Department of Colombia. The runway and village sit on a ridge in the eastern foothills of the Colombian Andes. The runway is adjacent to and south of the village.

== See also ==
- Transport in Colombia
- List of airports in Colombia
