= Corocora Airport =

Airstrip in Colombia

- IATA: none; ICAO: SKRO

Summary
- Airport type: Private
- Serves: Trinidad municipality, Colombia
- Elevation AMSL: 402 ft / 123 m
- Coordinates: 5°22′30″N 70°58′40″W

Map
- Location of the airport in Colombia

Runways
Direction	Length		Surface
Direction	m	ft	Surface
05/23	745	2,444	Gravel
- Source: Google Maps

Corocora Airport (ICAO: SKRO) is one of several airstrips serving the oil and gas-producing region of Trinidad municipality in the Casanare Department of Colombia.

The region is lightly populated. The nearest town is Santa Rosalía, 30 kilometres (19 mi) south. The municipality town of Trinidad is 75 kilometres (47 mi) west.

== See also ==
- Transport in Colombia
- List of airports in Colombia
