= Alfredo Vásquez Cobo International Airport =

Airport in Leticia, Colombia

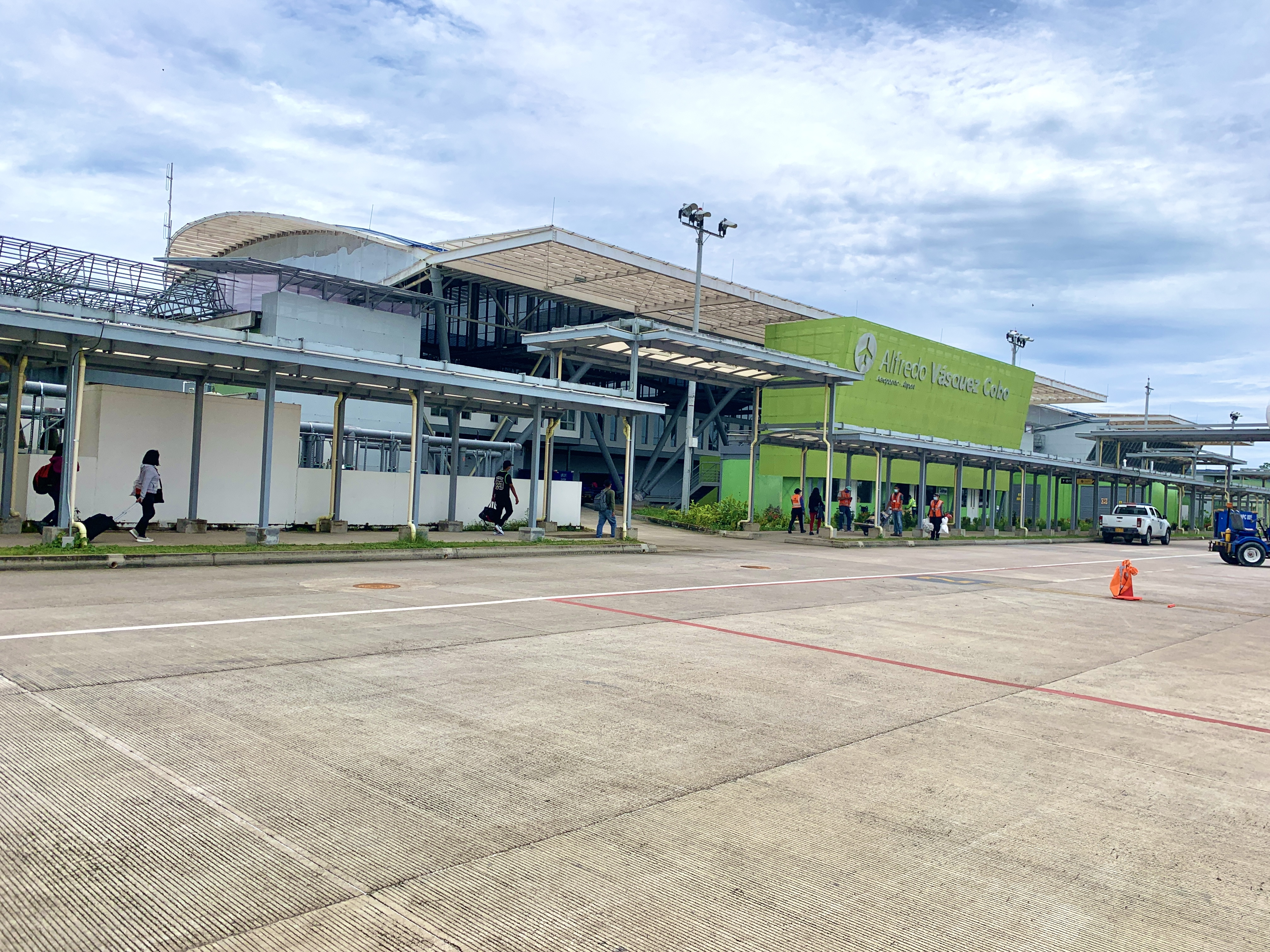
- IATA: LET; ICAO: SKLT; WMO: 80398

Summary
- Airport type: Public
- Operator: Aerocivil
- Serves: Leticia, Colombia
- Elevation AMSL: 277 ft (84 m)
- Coordinates: 4°11′40″S 69°56′35″W
- Website: aerocivil.gov.co/...

Map
- Location within Amazonas Department Location within Colombia

Runways
Direction	Length		Surface
Direction	m	ft	Surface
03/21	2,010	6,168	Asphalt

Statistics (2019)
- Passengers: 333,050
- Sources: GCM Google Maps

Alfredo Vásquez Cobo International Airport (Spanish: Aeropuerto Internacional Alfredo Vásquez Cobo, IATA: LET, ICAO: SKLT) is an international airport located in Leticia, Colombia's southernmost city and capital of the Amazonas Department.

The airport is important for the Amazon region, as it is the main gateway to the rest of the country and serves the tri-border area between Colombia, Brazil and Peru.

== History ==
Before Leticia had an established airport, the Colombian Air Force flew PBY Catalina aircraft from the interior of Colombia to the river banks of the city. Gustavo Rojas Pinilla seeing the need to better connect the Amazon region of Colombia to Bogota ordered for an airport to be built.

In 2015, Juan Manuel Santos, the then president of Colombia, announced an investment of over $142 billion Colombian pesos (or $42 million US dollars) to replace the existing facilities with brand new passenger and cargo terminals, control tower, parking and common areas, and access roadways. Construction was expected to conclude on November 30, 2018, however due to delays the new facilities are expected to be completed by June 2019.

Two hundred international tourists were trapped in Leticia after the highly-contagious Brazilian variant of COVID-19 virus was discovered in the city on January 28, 2021. Two weeks later the government agreed to fly the tourists out of the Alfredo Vásquez Cobo airport if the individuals were willing to pay. Regularly scheduled flights resumed on March 2.

== Airlines and destinations ==
Airlines	Destinations
Avianca	Bogotá
LATAM Colombia	Bogotá
SATENA	La Chorrera, La Pedrera, San José del Guaviare, Tarapacá

== Statistics ==
Annual Passenger Traffic
Year	Passengers	% Change
2019	333,050	▲18.8%
2018	270,298	▼6.7%
2017	289,682	▲8.7%
2016	266,443	▲10.6%
2015	240,790	▲10.7%
2014	217,419	▲24.1%
2013	175,152	▲9.2%
2012	160.380	▲4.3%
2011	153,777	▼1.9%
2010	156,697	▲25.2%
2009	125,104	▲35.6%
2008	92,257	-

== Colonel Herbert Boy Air Base ==
Permanently stationed onsite is the Amazonas Air Group, of the Colombian Air Force, which operates out of the Colonel Herbert Boy Air Base. The air base shares the same runway with the airport and jointly manage other facilities.

== Accidents ==
- On November 18, 2006, an AeroSucre Boeing 727 crashed during landing due to poor weather and fog against a television antenna with 40 meters of height. The three members of crew, as well as the three passengers, died in the accident.

== See also ==
- List of airports in Colombia
