= Sardinas Airport =

- IATA: none; ICAO: SKSD; LID: SK-126

Summary
- Airport type: Public
- Elevation AMSL: 478 ft / 146 m
- Coordinates: 4°59′09″N 71°30′20″W

Map
- Location of the airport in Colombia

Runways
| Direction | Length | | Surface |
| Direction | m | ft | Surface |
|---|---|---|---|
| 09/27 | 600 | 1,969 | Asphalt |
- Sources: OurAirports Google Maps

Sardinas Airport (ICAO: SKSD) is an airport serving one of the many oil production facilities in the Casanare Department of Colombia. The nearest population center is Orocué, 28 kilometres (17 mi) southeast of the runway.

== See also ==
- Transport in Colombia
- List of airports in Colombia
