= Calenturitas Airport =

Airport in Colombia

- IATA: none; ICAO: SKAL; LID: LLO

Summary
- Airport type: Public
- Serves: La Loma, Colombia
- Elevation AMSL: 195 ft / 59 m
- Coordinates: 9°39′15″N 73°29′40″W

Map
- Location of the airport in Colombia

Runways
Direction	Length		Surface
Direction	m	ft	Surface
03/21	1,220	4,003	Gravel
- Sources: OurAirports Google Maps

Calenturitas Airport (ICAO: SKAL) is an airport serving the Calenturitas coal mine and the town of La Loma in the Cesar Department of Colombia. The runway is adjacent to the surface mine, 10 kilometres (6.2 mi) northeast of La Loma.

== See also ==
- Transport in Colombia
- List of airports in Colombia
