= Santa Fe de Antioquia Airport =

- IATA: none; ICAO: SKSF

Summary
- Airport type: Defunct
- Serves: Santa Fe de Antioquia, Colombia
- Elevation AMSL: 1,500 ft / 457 m
- Coordinates: 6°30′05″N 75°49′22″W

Map

Runways
Direction	Length		Surface
Direction	ft	m	Surface
Closed
- Source: Google Maps OurAirports Google Earth

Santa Fe de Antioquia (IATA: SSL, ICAO: SKSL) is a closed airstrip that formerly served the town of Santa Fe de Antioquia in the Antioquia Department of Colombia.

Google Earth Historical Imagery shows that the 1,200 metres (3,900 ft) grass runway was built over with houses between 2006 and 2010.

== See also ==
- Transport in Colombia
- List of airports in Colombia
