= El Borrego Airport =

- IATA: none; ICAO: SKLB; LID: SK-158

Summary
- Airport type: Public
- Serves: La Loma, Colombia
- Elevation AMSL: 229 ft (70 m)
- Coordinates: 9°35′00″N 73°27′05″W

Map
- Location of the airport in Colombia

Runways
Direction	Length		Surface
Direction	m	ft	Surface
18/36	1,500	4,921	Asphalt
- Sources: OurAirports Google Maps

El Borrego Airport (ICAO: SKLB) is an airport serving the La Loma coal mine and the town of La Loma in the Cesar Department of Colombia. The runway is adjacent to the mine and midway between La Loma and La Jagua de Ibirico.

== See also ==
- Transport in Colombia
- List of airports in Colombia
