= Montelíbano Airport =

- IATA: MTB; ICAO: SKML

Summary
- Airport type: Public
- Serves: Montelíbano, Colombia
- Elevation AMSL: 160 ft / 49 m
- Coordinates: 7°58′20″N 75°25′58″W

Map
- Location of the airport in Colombia

Runways
Direction	Length		Surface
Direction	m	ft	Surface
13/31	1,100	3,609	Asphalt
- Source: GCM Google Maps

Montelíbano Airport (IATA: MTB, ICAO: SKML) is an airport serving the city of Montelíbano in the Córdoba Department of Colombia. The airport is 1 kilometre (0.62 mi) west of the town, near a bend in the San Jorge River.

The Montelibano non-directional beacon (Ident: MLB) is 3.2 nautical miles (5.9 km; 3.7 mi) northeast of the airport.

== See also ==
- Transport in Colombia
- List of airports in Colombia
