= Morelía Airport =

- IATA: MSK; ICAO: SKMO; LID: PGT

Summary
- Airport type: Public
- Serves: Puerto Gaitán, Colombia
- Elevation AMSL: 607 ft / 185 m
- Coordinates: 3°45′00″N 71°27′22″W

Map
- Location of the airport in Colombia

Runways
Direction	Length		Surface
Direction	m	ft	Surface
18/36	1,335	4,380	Asphalt
- Source: SkyVector Google Maps

Morelía Airport (IATA: MSK, ICAO: SKMO) is an airport serving the Morelía oil field and production facility 93 kilometres (58 mi) southeast of Puerto Gaitán in the Meta Department of Colombia.

== See also ==
- Transport in Colombia
- List of airports in Colombia
