= Hato Corozal Airport =

- IATA: HTZ; ICAO: SKHC

Summary
- Airport type: Public
- Serves: Hato Corozal, Colombia
- Elevation AMSL: 820 ft / 250 m
- Coordinates: 6°09′10″N 71°45′45″W

Map
- Location of the airport in Colombia

Runways
Direction	Length		Surface
Direction	m	ft	Surface
07/25	1,200	3,937	Grass
- Sources: GCM Google Maps

Hato Corozal Airport (IATA: HTZ, ICAO: SKHC) is an airport serving the town of Hato Corozal, in the Casanare Department of Colombia.

The runway is on the southeast side of the town, and has an additional 550 metres (1,800 ft) of grass overrun on the southwest end.

== See also ==
- Transport in Colombia
- List of airports in Colombia
