= La Pedrera Airport =

La Pedrera Airport Aeropuerto de La Pedrera
- IATA: LPD; ICAO: SKLP

Summary
- Airport type: Public
- Serves: La Pedrera, Colombia
- Elevation AMSL: 590 ft / 180 m
- Coordinates: 1°19′35″S 69°34′50″W

Map

Runways
Direction	Length		Surface
Direction	m	ft	Surface
15/33	1,400	4,593	Asphalt
- Sources: GCM Google Maps

La Pedrera Airport (IATA: LPD, ICAO: SKLP) (Spanish: Aeropuerto de La Pedrera) is an airport serving the Caquetá River town of La Pedrera in the Amazonas Department of southern Colombia.

The runway length does not include 290 metres (950 ft) of unpaved overrun on the southeast end. The La Pedrera non-directional beacon (Ident: LPD) is located on the field.

== Airlines and destinations ==
Airlines	Destinations
SATENA	Leticia

== See also ==
- Transport in Colombia
- List of airports in Colombia
