= El Bagre Airport =

El Bagre Airport El Tomin Airport
- IATA: EBG; ICAO: SKEB

Summary
- Airport type: Public
- Operator: Private
- Serves: El Bagre, Colombia
- Elevation AMSL: 180 ft (55 m)
- Coordinates: 7°35′47″N 74°48′32″W

Map
- Location within Antioquia Department Location within Colombia

Runways
| Direction | Length | | Surface |
| Direction | m | ft | Surface |
|---|---|---|---|
| 01/19 | 1,000 | 3,281 | Asphalt |
- Sources: WAD GCM Google Maps

El Bagre Airport or El Tomin Airport (Spanish: Aeropuerto El Tomin) (IATA: EBG, ICAO: SKEB) is an airport serving El Bagre, a municipality of the Antioquia Department in Colombia.

The runway length does not include a 330-metre (1,080 ft) grass overrun on the north end.

== See also ==
- Transport in Colombia
- List of airports in Colombia
