= Las Cruces Airport (Colombia) =

Aeropuerto las cruces
- IATA: SNT; ICAO: SKRU

Summary
- Airport type: Publicó
- Serves: Sabana de Torres, Colombia
- Elevation AMSL: 440 ft / 134 m
- Coordinates: 7°23′00″N 73°30′20″W

Map
- Location of the airport in Colombia

Runways
Direction	Length		Surface
Direction	m	ft	Surface
11/29	1,200	3,937	Asphalt
- Source: GCM Google Maps

Las Cruces Airport (IATA: SNT, ICAO: SKRU) is an airport serving the town of Sabana de Torres in the Santander Department of Colombia.

The runway is on the southern edge of the town.

== See also ==
- Transport in Colombia
- List of airports in Colombia
