= El Troncal Airport =

- IATA: ARQ; ICAO: SKAT

Summary
- Airport type: Public
- Serves: Arauquita, Colombia
- Elevation AMSL: 512 ft / 156 m
- Coordinates: 7°01′16″N 71°23′20″W

Map
- Location of the airport in Colombia

Runways
Direction	Length		Surface
Direction	m	ft	Surface
08/26	970	3,182	Asphalt
- Sources: GCM OurAirports

El Troncal Airport (IATA: ARQ, ICAO: SKAT) is an airport serving the river town of Arauquita in the Arauca Department of Colombia. The runway is 4 kilometres (2.5 mi) east of Arauquita, adjacent to the Arauca River. East departures cross the river into Venezuela.

== See also ==
- Transport in Colombia
- List of airports in Colombia
