= Berástegui Airport =

- IATA: none; ICAO: SKBR

Summary
- Airport type: Public
- Serves: Ciénaga de Oro, Colombia
- Location: Berástegui
- Elevation AMSL: 38 ft / 12 m
- Coordinates: 8°53′05″N 75°41′00″W

Map
- Location of the airport in Colombia

Runways
Direction	Length		Surface
Direction	m	ft	Surface
07/25	1,520	4,987	Gravel
- Sources: OurAirports

Berástegui Airport (ICAO: SKBR) is an airport serving the town of Ciénaga de Oro in the Córdoba Department of Colombia. The airport is 6 kilometres (3.7 mi) west of the town, near the village of Berástegui.

== See also ==
- Transport in Colombia
- List of airports in Colombia
