= Velasquez Airport =

Velasquez Airport Aeropuerto de Velasquez
- IATA: PYA; ICAO: SKVL

Summary
- Airport type: Public/Military
- Serves: Puerto Boyacá, Colombia
- Elevation AMSL: 566 ft (173 m)
- Coordinates: 5°56′20″N 074°27′25″W

Map
- Location of the airport in Colombia

Runways
Direction	Length		Surface
Direction	m	ft	Surface
15/33	1,680	5,512	Asphalt
- Sources: GCM Google Maps

Velasquez Airport (IATA: PYA, ICAO: SKVL) is an airport serving the Magdalena River town of Puerto Boyacá in the Boyacá Department of Colombia. The runway is in the countryside 13 kilometres (8.1 mi) east of Puerto Boyacá.

== See also ==
- Transport in Colombia
- List of airports in Colombia
