= Tiquie Airport =

- IATA: none; ICAO: SKTE; LID: SK-501

Summary
- Airport type: Public
- Serves: Tiquié, Colombia
- Elevation AMSL: 518 ft / 158 m
- Coordinates: 0°14′00″N 70°10′10″W

Map
- Location of airport in Colombia

Runways
Direction	Length		Surface
Direction	m	ft	Surface
05/23	660	2,165	Grass
- Source: Bing Maps OurAirports

Tiquie Airport (ICAO: SKTE) is an airport serving Tiquié, a village in the Vaupés Department of Colombia. The runway is inside the village, which is on the upper reaches of the Tiquié River (sv). Tiquié is 14 kilometres (9 mi) west of the border with Brazil.

The Pari-Cachoeira non-directional beacon (Ident: PCR) is located 22.9 nautical miles (42 km) east of the runway. The Mitu VOR-DME (Ident: MTU) is located 60.7 nautical miles (112 km) north of the runway.

== See also ==
- Transport in Colombia
- List of airports in Colombia
