= Caño Garza Airport =

Airport in Colombia

- IATA: none; ICAO: SKAA; LID: SK-054

Summary
- Airport type: Public
- Elevation AMSL: 544 ft / 166 m
- Coordinates: 5°35′30″N 71°35′22″W

Map
- Location of the airport in Colombia

Runways
Direction	Length		Surface
Direction	m	ft	Surface
04/22	655	2,149	Asphalt
- Sources: OurAirports Google Maps

Caño Garza Airport (ICAO: SKAA) is an airport serving one of the many oil production facilities in the Casanare Department of Colombia. The nearest population center is Trinidad, 21 kilometres (13 mi) south of the runway.

== See also ==
- Transport in Colombia
- List of airports in Colombia
