= La Chorrera Airport =

- IATA: LCR; ICAO: none

Summary
- Airport type: Public
- Operator: Aerocivil
- Location: La Chorrera, Colombia
- Coordinates: 1°27′25″S 72°48′05″W

Map

Runways
Direction	Length		Surface
Direction	m	ft	Surface
04/22	1,450	4,757
- GCM Google Maps

La Chorrera Airport (IATA: LCR) is an airport serving the town of La Chorrera in the Amazonas Department of Colombia.

== Airlines and destinations ==
Airlines	Destinations
SATENA	Araracuara, Leticia

== See also ==
- Transport in Colombia
- List of airports in Colombia
