= Caño Grande Airport =

Airport in Colombia

- IATA: none; ICAO: SKDU; LID: CAA

Summary
- Airport type: Public
- Elevation AMSL: 426 ft / 130 m
- Coordinates: 5°10′22″N 71°08′30″W

Map
- Location of the airport in Colombia

Runways
Direction	Length		Surface
Direction	m	ft	Surface
04/22	600	1,969	Asphalt
- Sources: OurAirports Google Maps

Caño Grande Airport (ICAO: SKDU) is an airport serving one of the many oil production facilities in the Casanare Department of Colombia. The nearest population center is Santa Rosalía, 31 kilometres (19 mi) east of the runway.

== See also ==
- Transport in Colombia
- List of airports in Colombia
