= Tunja Airport =

Tunja Airport General Gustavo Rojas Pinilla Airport
- IATA: GUS; ICAO: SKTJ

Summary
- Airport type: Public
- Serves: Tunja, Colombia
- Elevation AMSL: 8,940 ft / 2,725 m
- Coordinates: 5°32′25″N 73°20′45″W

Map
- Location of the airport in Colombia

Runways
Direction	Length		Surface
Direction	m	ft	Surface
04/22	1,104	3,622	Asphalt
- Source: GCM Google Maps

Tunja Airport (ICAO: SKTJ) is a high-elevation airport serving Tunja, the capital of Boyacá Department in Colombia. The airport and city lay between two large north–south ridges, with the airport on a slight rise east of the city.

== See also ==
- Transport in Colombia
- List of airports in Colombia
