= Cupica Airport =

- IATA: none; ICAO: SKCP

Summary
- Airport type: Public
- Elevation AMSL: 24 ft / 7 m
- Coordinates: 6°41′43″N 77°29′35″W

Map
- Location of the airport in Colombia

Runways
Direction	Length		Surface
Direction	m	ft	Surface
07/25	750	2,461
- Sources: GCM Google Maps

Cupica Airport (ICAO: SKCP) is an airport serving the northern Solano Bay area on the Pacific coast of Colombia's Chocó Department. The runway parallels the shoreline of the bay.

The Bahia Cupica Airport (IATA: BHF) is 24 kilometres (15 mi) southeast of Cupica Airport, also on the bay.

== See also ==
- Transport in Colombia
- List of airports in Colombia
