= Morela Airport =

Puerto Berrío Airport Morela Airport
- IATA: PBE; ICAO: SKPR

Summary
- Airport type: Public
- Serves: Puerto Berrío, Colombia
- Elevation AMSL: 445 ft / 136 m
- Coordinates: 6°27′35″N 74°24′38″W

Map
- Location of the airport in Colombia PBE (Colombia)

Runways
Direction	Length		Surface
Direction	m	ft	Surface
18/36	1,289	4,229	Asphalt
- Source: GCM Google Maps

Morela Airport (IATA: PBE, ICAO: SKPR) is an airport serving the Magdalena River town of Puerto Berrío in the Antioquia Department of Colombia. The runway is 3 kilometres (1.9 mi) south of the town, along the west bank of the river.

== See also ==
- Transport in Colombia
- List of airports in Colombia
