= Cimitarra Airport =

Airport in Colombia

- IATA: CIM; ICAO: SKCM

Summary
- Airport type: Public
- Serves: Cimitarra, Colombia
- Elevation AMSL: 740 ft / 226 m
- Coordinates: 6°22′05″N 73°58′15″W

Map
- Location of the airport in Colombia

Runways
| Direction | Length | | Surface |
| Direction | m | ft | Surface |
|---|---|---|---|
| 16/34 | 1,400 | 4,593 | Asphalt |
- Sources: GCM

Cimitarra Airport (IATA: CIM, ICAO: SKCM) is an airport serving the town of Cimitarra in the Santander Department of Colombia. The airport is 6 kilometres (3.7 mi) northwest of the town.

== See also ==
- Transport in Colombia
- List of airports in Colombia
