= Hacaritama Airport =

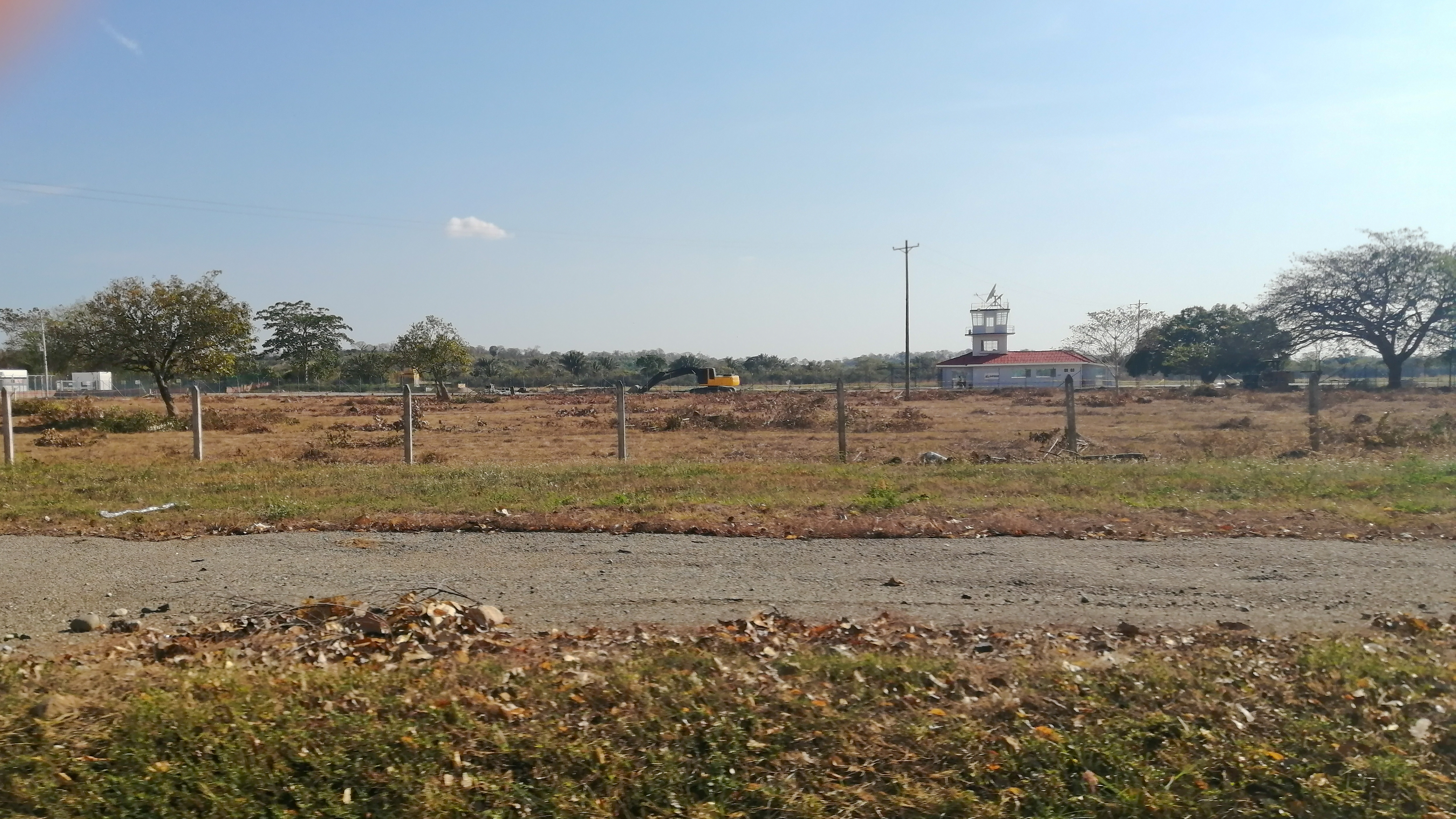
- IATA: HAY; ICAO: SKAG

Summary
- Airport type: Public
- Serves: Aguachica
- Elevation AMSL: 545 ft (166 m)
- Coordinates: 8°14′50″N 73°34′55″W

Map
- Location of the airport in Colombia

Runways
Direction	Length		Surface
Direction	m	ft	Surface
11/29	1,482	4,862	Gravel
- Sources: GCM Google Maps

Hacaritama Airport (IATA: HAY, ICAO: SKAG) is an airport serving the city of Aguachica in Cesar Department, Colombia. The airport is 7 kilometres (4.3 mi) south of the city.

== Airlines and destinations ==
Airlines	Destinations
SATENA	Bogota, Barranquilla

== See also ==
- List of airports in Colombia
- Transport in Colombia
