= Tibú Airport =

- IATA: TIB; ICAO: SKTB

Summary
- Airport type: Public
- Serves: Tibú, Colombia
- Elevation AMSL: 194 ft / 59 m
- Coordinates: 8°37′53″N 72°43′55″W

Map
- Location of the airport in Colombia

Runways
Direction	Length		Surface
Direction	m	ft	Surface
09/27	1,500	4,921	Asphalt
- Source: GCM Bing Maps

Tibú Airport ((IATA: TIB, ICAO: SKTB)) is a public airport serving the town and municipality of Tibú, located in the Norte de Santander Department of Colombia.

The airport is situated on the southern edge of the town, along the east bank of the Caño Campo Cinco River. Both the town and the airport lie approximately 7 km (4.3 mi) west of the border with Venezuela.

== Airlines and destinations ==
Airlines	Destinations
Clic	Cucuta

== See also ==
- Transport in Colombia
- List of airports in Colombia
