= Villanueva Airport =

- IATA: none; ICAO: SKVN

Summary
- Airport type: Public
- Serves: Villanueva
- Elevation AMSL: 1,002 ft / 305 m
- Coordinates: 4°38′13″N 72°57′00″W

Map
- Location of the airport in Colombia

Runways
Direction	Length		Surface
Direction	m	ft	Surface
05/23	1,300	4,265	Asphalt
- Sources: GCM Google Maps

Villanueva Airport (ICAO: SKVN) is an airport serving the town of Villanueva, in the Casanare Department of Colombia. The runway is 4 kilometres (2.5 mi) northwest of the town.

The Barranca De Upia non-directional beacon (Ident: UPI) is located 7.2 kilometres (4.5 mi) southwest of the airport, not aligned with either runway.

== See also ==
- Transport in Colombia
- List of airports in Colombia
