= Tarapacá, Amazonas =

- Municipality and town
- Location of the municipality and town of Tarapacá, Amazonas in the Amazonas Department of Colombia

- Location in Colombia
- Coordinates: 2°52′44″S 69°44′38″W
- Country: Colombia
- Department: Amazonas Department
- Founded: 14 February 1909

Area
  - Total: 1,443 km^{2} (557 sq mi)

Population (2015)
  - Total: 4,195
- Time zone: UTC-5 (Colombia Standard Time)
- Climate: Af

Tarapacá is a town and municipality in the Colombian Department of Amazonas. As of 2015, the population comprised 4,195 people.

The town is served by Tarapacá Airport.

== History ==
Originally founded by Peruvian refugees from the War of the Pacific, it was awarded to Colombia after the Salomón-Lozano Treaty signing in July 1922. These refugees would later resettle in the settlement of the same name in northern Peru.

== Places with the same name ==
- Nuevo Tarapacá, Peru
- San Lorenzo de Tarapacá, Chile
- Tarapacá Region, Chile

== See also ==
- Peru-Colombia War
- War of the Pacific
