= Gabriel Vargas Santos Airport =

Colombian airport in Tame in the departamento of Arauca

Gabriel Vargas Santos Airport Tame Airport
- IATA: TME; ICAO: SKTM

Summary
- Airport type: Public
- Location: Tame, Colombia
- Elevation AMSL: 1,050 ft / 320 m
- Coordinates: 6°27′04″N 71°45′35″W

Map
- Location of the airport in Colombia

Runways
Direction	Length		Surface
Direction	m	ft	Surface
07/25	2,000	6,562	Asphalt
- Sources: GCM

Gabriel Vargas Santos Airport (IATA: TME, ICAO: SKTM) is an airport serving Tame, in the Arauca Department of Colombia. The runway is just west of the town.

== Airlines and destinations ==
Airlines	Destinations
SATENA	Bogotá, Saravena

== See also ==
- Transport in Colombia
- List of airports in Colombia
