= Flandes =

Coordinates: 4°17′N 74°48′W

- Municipality and town
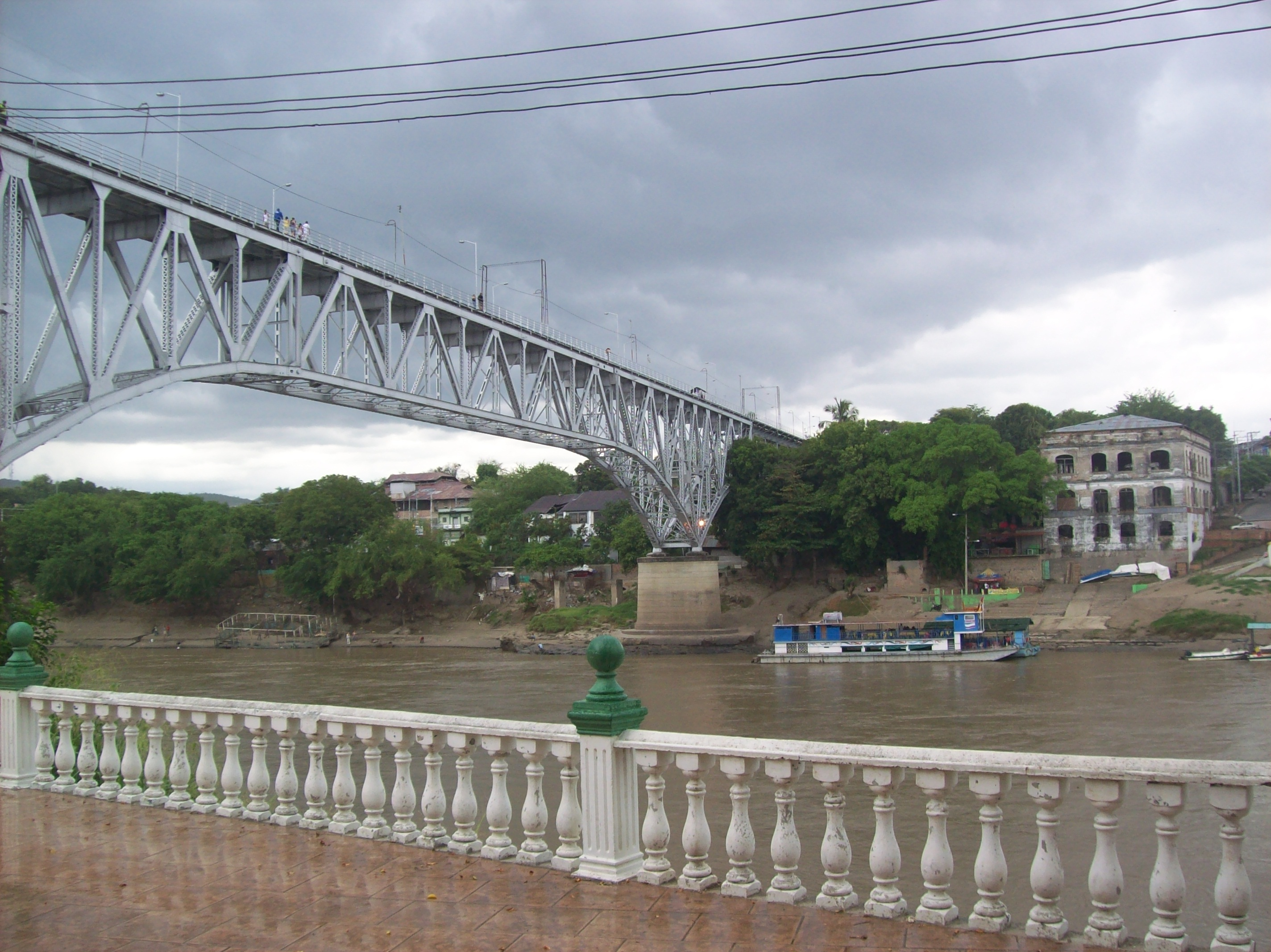

- Flag Coat of arms

- Location of the municipality and town of Flandes in the Tolima Department of Colombia.
- Country: Colombia
- Department: Tolima Department

Area
  - Municipality and town: 96.8 km^{2} (37.4 sq mi)
  - Urban: 7.44 km^{2} (2.87 sq mi)
- Elevation: 285 m (935 ft)

Population (2018 census)
  - Municipality and town: 28,389
  - Density: 293/km^{2} (760/sq mi)
  - Urban: 24,551
  - Urban density: 3,300/km^{2} (8,550/sq mi)
- Time zone: UTC-5 (Colombia Standard Time)

Flandes is a town and municipality in the Tolima department of Colombia. The population of the municipality was 28,389 as of the 2018 census.

== Climate ==
Climate data for Flandes (Santiago Vila Airport), elevation 286 m (938 ft), (1981–2010)
| Month | Jan | Feb | Mar | Apr | May | Jun | Jul | Aug | Sep | Oct | Nov | Dec | Year |
|---|---|---|---|---|---|---|---|---|---|---|---|---|---|
| Mean daily maximum °C (°F) | 34.3 (93.7) | 34.3 (93.7) | 33.8 (92.8) | 32.8 (91.0) | 32.6 (90.7) | 33.2 (91.8) | 34.4 (93.9) | 35.5 (95.9) | 34.6 (94.3) | 33.1 (91.6) | 32.5 (90.5) | 33.1 (91.6) | 33.7 (92.7) |
| Daily mean °C (°F) | 29.1 (84.4) | 29.2 (84.6) | 28.9 (84.0) | 28.3 (82.9) | 28.1 (82.6) | 28.2 (82.8) | 28.8 (83.8) | 29.8 (85.6) | 29.4 (84.9) | 28.3 (82.9) | 27.9 (82.2) | 28.5 (83.3) | 28.7 (83.7) |
| Mean daily minimum °C (°F) | 23.3 (73.9) | 23.5 (74.3) | 23.5 (74.3) | 23.4 (74.1) | 23.1 (73.6) | 22.6 (72.7) | 22.2 (72.0) | 23.0 (73.4) | 23.2 (73.8) | 23.1 (73.6) | 23.1 (73.6) | 23.1 (73.6) | 23.1 (73.6) |
| Average precipitation mm (inches) | 49.3 (1.94) | 84.6 (3.33) | 117.7 (4.63) | 183.2 (7.21) | 157.6 (6.20) | 64.3 (2.53) | 36.3 (1.43) | 41.8 (1.65) | 121.3 (4.78) | 158.9 (6.26) | 110.1 (4.33) | 88.6 (3.49) | 1,213.7 (47.78) |
| Average precipitation days | 9 | 12 | 14 | 17 | 16 | 13 | 12 | 10 | 14 | 16 | 15 | 12 | 158 |
| Average relative humidity (%) | 66 | 66 | 68 | 73 | 75 | 71 | 64 | 58 | 64 | 71 | 75 | 71 | 68 |
| Mean monthly sunshine hours | 207.7 | 172.2 | 167.4 | 162.0 | 176.7 | 180.0 | 198.4 | 198.4 | 186.0 | 189.1 | 183.0 | 198.4 | 2,219.3 |
| Mean daily sunshine hours | 6.7 | 6.1 | 5.4 | 5.4 | 5.7 | 6.0 | 6.4 | 6.4 | 6.2 | 6.1 | 6.1 | 6.4 | 6.1 |
Source: Instituto de Hidrologia Meteorologia y Estudios Ambientales
