= Gonzalo Mejía Airport =

- IATA: TRB; ICAO: SKTU

Summary
- Airport type: Public
- Serves: Turbo, Colombia
- Elevation AMSL: 6 ft / 2 m
- Coordinates: 8°04′25″N 76°44′25″W

Map

Runways
Direction	Length		Surface
Direction	m	ft	Surface
17/35	985	3,232	Asphalt
- Source: GCM Google Maps

Gonzalo Mejía Airport (IATA: TRB, ICAO: SKTU) is an airport 2 kilometres (1.2 mi) southwest of the city of Turbo, in the Antioquia Department of Colombia. The airport is on a small wooded peninsula running south from the city. As almost a quarter of its runway has been completely eroded by the sea, there are currently no fixed-wing operations at the airport.

The Turbo non-directional beacon (Ident: TUR) is located just east of the field.

== See also ==
- Transport in Colombia
- List of airports in Colombia
