= Paz de Ariporo Airport =

- IATA: PZA; ICAO: SKPZ

Summary
- Airport type: Public
- Serves: Paz de Ariporo, Colombia
- Elevation AMSL: 900 ft / 274 m
- Coordinates: 5°52′30″N 71°53′15″W

Map
- Location of the airport in Colombia

Runways
| Direction | Length | | Surface |
| Direction | m | ft | Surface |
|---|---|---|---|
| 04/22 | 1,504 | 4,934 | Asphalt |
- Source: GCM Google Maps

Paz de Ariporo Airport (IATA: PZA, ICAO: SKPZ) is an airport serving the town of Paz de Ariporo in the Casanare Department of Colombia. The runway is adjacent to the eastern edge of the town.

== See also ==
- Transport in Colombia
- List of airports in Colombia
