= Puerto Boyacá =

- Municipality and town

- Flag Coat of arms

- Location of the municipality and town of Puerto Boyacá in the Boyacá Department of Colombia

- Location in Colombia
- Coordinates: 5°58′41″N 74°35′23″W
- Country: Colombia
- Department: Boyacá Department
- Province: Boyacá Special Handling Zone
- Founded: December 14, 1957

Government
  - Mayor: Jicly Esgardo Mutis Isaza (2020-2023)

Area
  - Municipality and town: 1,514 km^{2} (585 sq mi)
  - Urban: 4.08 km^{2} (1.58 sq mi)
- Elevation: 145 m (476 ft)

Population (2018 census)
  - Municipality and town: 46,736
  - Density: 30.87/km^{2} (79.95/sq mi)
  - Urban: 32,979
  - Urban density: 8,080/km^{2} (20,900/sq mi)
- Demonym: Puertoboyacense
- Time zone: UTC-5 (Colombia Standard Time)
- Postal code: 152201-19
- Area code: 57 + 8
- Website: Official website

Puerto Boyacá is a Colombian river-port town and municipality by the Magdalena River in the Boyacá Department, where is also considered a Special Trade Zone due to its port status. Its main industries are oil exploration and processing. In the 1980s and early 1990s, Puerto Boyacá was affected intensively by the Colombian Armed Conflict.

== Borders ==
- North - departments of Bolívar, Santander
- West - Magdalena River and Puerto Berrío, Puerto Nare, Puerto Triunfo and Sonsón municipalities of Antioquia Department
- South - Puerto Salgar and Yacopí municipalities of Cundinamarca
- East - municipality of Otanche (Boyacá)

== Born in Puerto Boyacá ==
- Fredy Guarín, Colombian football player

== Other information ==
- Market Day: Sunday
- Distance from Tunja: 373 km
- Median temperature: 32 °C

=== Climate ===
Climate data for Puerto Boyacá (Pto Boyaca), elevation 350 m (1,150 ft), (1981–2010)
Month	Jan	Feb	Mar	Apr	May	Jun	Jul	Aug	Sep	Oct	Nov	Dec	Year
Record high °C (°F)	38.6 (101.5)	39.4 (102.9)	40.0 (104.0)	37.4 (99.3)	37.0 (98.6)	38.0 (100.4)	41.2 (106.2)	41.2 (106.2)	39.0 (102.2)	37.4 (99.3)	37.4 (99.3)	37.4 (99.3)	41.2 (106.2)
Mean daily maximum °C (°F)	32.7 (90.9)	33.2 (91.8)	32.5 (90.5)	32.0 (89.6)	32.2 (90.0)	32.8 (91.0)	33.5 (92.3)	33.8 (92.8)	32.6 (90.7)	31.4 (88.5)	31.3 (88.3)	31.8 (89.2)	32.5 (90.5)
Daily mean °C (°F)	28.0 (82.4)	28.2 (82.8)	27.8 (82.0)	27.6 (81.7)	27.8 (82.0)	27.9 (82.2)	28.3 (82.9)	28.4 (83.1)	27.6 (81.7)	27.0 (80.6)	27.1 (80.8)	27.5 (81.5)	27.8 (82.0)
Mean daily minimum °C (°F)	23.7 (74.7)	23.7 (74.7)	23.4 (74.1)	23.1 (73.6)	23.1 (73.6)	23.3 (73.9)	23.1 (73.6)	23.1 (73.6)	22.9 (73.2)	22.7 (72.9)	23.1 (73.6)	23.6 (74.5)	23.2 (73.8)
Record low °C (°F)	20.0 (68.0)	20.2 (68.4)	18.0 (64.4)	17.4 (63.3)	16.8 (62.2)	20.0 (68.0)	20.2 (68.4)	20.0 (68.0)	19.0 (66.2)	19.4 (66.9)	20.0 (68.0)	20.6 (69.1)	16.8 (62.2)
Average precipitation mm (inches)	65.6 (2.58)	104.4 (4.11)	181.2 (7.13)	270.9 (10.67)	251.3 (9.89)	167.4 (6.59)	159.2 (6.27)	166.9 (6.57)	258.7 (10.19)	290.6 (11.44)	190.4 (7.50)	115.0 (4.53)	2,156.6 (84.91)
Average precipitation days (≥ 1.0 mm)	8	10	14	19	20	17	16	16	18	20	16	11	180
Average relative humidity (%)	76	75	78	80	79	78	75	74	78	81	82	79	78
Source: Instituto de Hidrologia Meteorologia y Estudios Ambientales
