= Los Pozos Airport =

- IATA: LPZ; ICAO: SKSG

Summary
- Airport type: Public
- Serves: San Gil, Colombia
- Elevation AMSL: 5,498 ft (1,676 m)
- Coordinates: 6°35′25″N 73°07′45″W

Map
- Location of the airport in Colombia

Runways
Direction	Length		Surface
Direction	m	ft	Surface
17/35	1,360	4,462	Asphalt
- Source: GCM Google Maps

Los Pozos Airport (ICAO: SKSG) is an airport serving the city of San Gil in the Santander Department of Colombia.

The airport sits on a plateau in the eastern Colombian Andes, 1,800 feet (550 m) above San Gil, which lies in a steep cut through the plateau on the banks of the Fonce River.

== Airlines and destinations ==
Airlines	Destinations
SATENA	Medellín–Olaya Herrera

== See also ==
- Transport in Colombia
- List of airports in Colombia
