= Cravo Norte =

Coordinates: 6°18′N 70°12′W

- Municipality and town
- Flag Coat of arms

- Location of the municipality and town of Cravo Norte in the Arauca Department of Colombia
- Country: Colombia
- Department: Arauca Department
- Founded: 1538

Government
  - Mayor: Javier Esneider Triana Mujica

Area
  - Municipality and town: 5,301 km^{2} (2,047 sq mi)
- Elevation: 124 m (407 ft)

Population (2015)
  - Municipality and town: 3,331
  - Density: 0.63/km^{2} (1.6/sq mi)
  - Urban: 2,319
- Time zone: UTC-5 (Colombia Standard Time)
- Climate: Aw
- Website: www.cravonorte-arauca.gov.co

Cravo Norte is a town and municipality in the Arauca Department, Colombia. It is thought to have been founded in 1538 by the Jesuit missionary Joseph Gumilla. The first census was conducted in May 1797 and counted a population of 205.

== Climate ==
Cravo Norte has a tropical monsoon climate (Köppen Am) with little rainfall from December to March and heavy to very heavy rainfall from April to November.

Climate data for Cravo Norte
Month	Jan	Feb	Mar	Apr	May	Jun	Jul	Aug	Sep	Oct	Nov	Dec	Year
Mean daily maximum °C (°F)	33.2 (91.8)	34.4 (93.9)	34.4 (93.9)	32.5 (90.5)	30.6 (87.1)	29.5 (85.1)	29.4 (84.9)	30.3 (86.5)	31.0 (87.8)	31.5 (88.7)	31.9 (89.4)	32.2 (90.0)	31.7 (89.1)
Daily mean °C (°F)	27.3 (81.1)	28.2 (82.8)	28.7 (83.7)	27.8 (82.0)	26.7 (80.1)	25.9 (78.6)	25.8 (78.4)	26.3 (79.3)	26.8 (80.2)	27.1 (80.8)	27.4 (81.3)	27.2 (81.0)	27.1 (80.8)
Mean daily minimum °C (°F)	21.5 (70.7)	22.0 (71.6)	23.0 (73.4)	23.2 (73.8)	22.8 (73.0)	22.4 (72.3)	22.2 (72.0)	22.3 (72.1)	22.6 (72.7)	22.7 (72.9)	22.9 (73.2)	22.2 (72.0)	22.5 (72.5)
Average rainfall mm (inches)	17.9 (0.70)	20.8 (0.82)	61.0 (2.40)	188.9 (7.44)	318.4 (12.54)	403.9 (15.90)	410.0 (16.14)	279.4 (11.00)	266.5 (10.49)	256.9 (10.11)	146.0 (5.75)	41.6 (1.64)	2,411.3 (94.93)
Average rainy days	1	2	4	10	17	19	19	16	15	12	8	3	126
Source 1: IDEAM
Source 2: Climate-Data.org
