= Paz de Ariporo =

Coordinates: 5°53′N 71°54′W

- Municipality and town
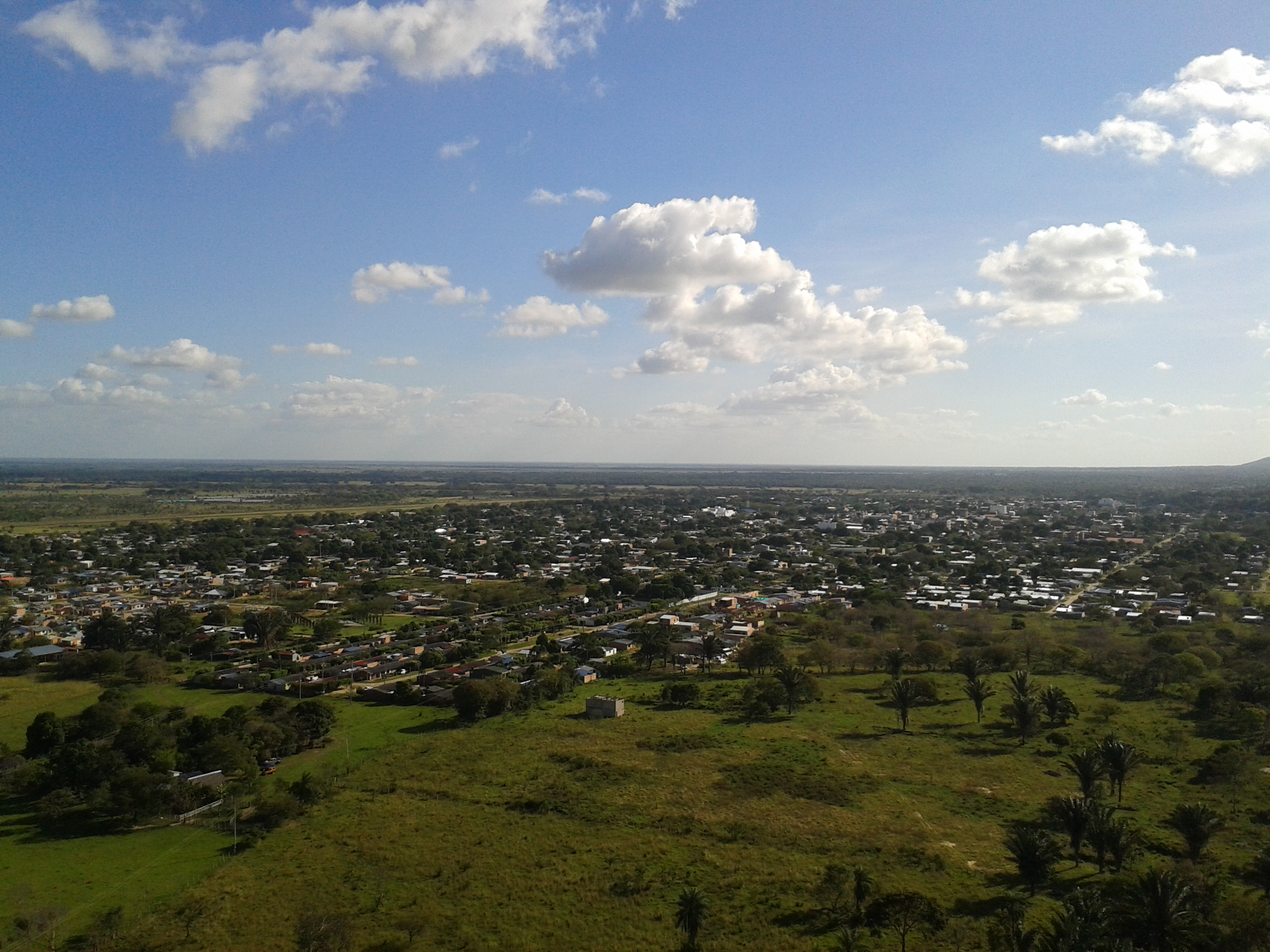
- View of Paz de Ariporo

- Flag Coat of arms

- Location of the municipality and town of Paz de Ariporo in the Casanare Department of Colombia.
- Country: Colombia
- Region: Orinoquía Region
- Department: Casanare Department
- Elevation: 340 m (1,120 ft)

Population (Census 2018)
  - Total: 34,446
- Time zone: UTC-5 (Colombia Standard Time)
- Website: http://www.pazdeariporo-casanare.gov.co/

Paz de Ariporo is a town and municipality in the Department of Casanare, Colombia.

An 1856 watercolor by Manuel María Paz is an early depiction of the main square of Paz de Ariporo. At that time, the town was called Moreno, and it served as the capital of Casanare Province.

The town is served by Paz de Ariporo Airport.
