= Santa Rita, Vichada =

Town and municipality in the Vichada Department

Santa Rita is a populated center of Colombia located in the Department of Vichada, Colombia.
