= Chaparral, Tolima =

Coordinates: 3°45′N 75°35′W

- Municipality and town

- Flag Seal

- Location of the municipality and town of Chaparral, Tolima in the Tolima Department of Colombia.
- Country: Colombia
- Department: Tolima Department

Government
  - Mayor: Helver González Mora

Area
  - Municipality and town: 2,102 km^{2} (812 sq mi)
  - Urban: 6.76 km^{2} (2.61 sq mi)
- Elevation: 854 m (2,802 ft)

Population (2018 census)
  - Municipality and town: 50,367
  - Density: 23.96/km^{2} (62.06/sq mi)
  - Urban: 28,615
  - Urban density: 4,230/km^{2} (11,000/sq mi)
- Time zone: UTC-5 (Colombia Standard Time)

Chaparral is a town and municipality in the Tolima department of Colombia.

== Population ==
The population of the municipality was 40,880 as of the 1993 census. The 2017 census had a total population of 47,293

== Climate ==
Climate data for Chaparral (Demostracion Gja), elevation 1,040 m (3,410 ft), (1981–2010)
| Month | Jan | Feb | Mar | Apr | May | Jun | Jul | Aug | Sep | Oct | Nov | Dec | Year |
|---|---|---|---|---|---|---|---|---|---|---|---|---|---|
| Mean daily maximum °C (°F) | 29.0 (84.2) | 29.3 (84.7) | 29.4 (84.9) | 29.4 (84.9) | 29.4 (84.9) | 30.2 (86.4) | 30.6 (87.1) | 31.2 (88.2) | 30.9 (87.6) | 29.2 (84.6) | 28.3 (82.9) | 28.6 (83.5) | 29.6 (85.3) |
| Daily mean °C (°F) | 24.1 (75.4) | 24.2 (75.6) | 24.2 (75.6) | 24.2 (75.6) | 24.3 (75.7) | 24.7 (76.5) | 24.9 (76.8) | 25.3 (77.5) | 25.0 (77.0) | 24.0 (75.2) | 23.6 (74.5) | 23.7 (74.7) | 24.4 (75.9) |
| Mean daily minimum °C (°F) | 19.6 (67.3) | 19.8 (67.6) | 19.9 (67.8) | 19.8 (67.6) | 19.8 (67.6) | 19.9 (67.8) | 19.8 (67.6) | 20.0 (68.0) | 19.8 (67.6) | 19.5 (67.1) | 19.4 (66.9) | 19.5 (67.1) | 19.7 (67.5) |
| Average precipitation mm (inches) | 203.2 (8.00) | 201.5 (7.93) | 245.1 (9.65) | 308.4 (12.14) | 269.7 (10.62) | 113.2 (4.46) | 85.7 (3.37) | 89.5 (3.52) | 169.5 (6.67) | 352.5 (13.88) | 345.8 (13.61) | 280.7 (11.05) | 2,664.8 (104.91) |
| Average precipitation days | 17 | 16 | 18 | 21 | 19 | 13 | 11 | 10 | 14 | 22 | 22 | 20 | 200 |
| Average relative humidity (%) | 79 | 78 | 80 | 81 | 80 | 75 | 70 | 67 | 72 | 79 | 82 | 81 | 77 |
| Mean monthly sunshine hours | 182.9 | 158.1 | 148.8 | 147.0 | 170.5 | 171.0 | 179.8 | 179.8 | 168.0 | 161.2 | 150.0 | 179.8 | 1,996.9 |
| Mean daily sunshine hours | 5.9 | 5.6 | 4.8 | 4.9 | 5.5 | 5.7 | 5.8 | 5.8 | 5.6 | 5.2 | 5.0 | 5.8 | 5.5 |
Source: Instituto de Hidrologia Meteorologia y Estudios Ambientales

Climate data for Chaparral (Limon El), elevation 1,000 m (3,300 ft), (1981–2010)
| Month | Jan | Feb | Mar | Apr | May | Jun | Jul | Aug | Sep | Oct | Nov | Dec | Year |
|---|---|---|---|---|---|---|---|---|---|---|---|---|---|
| Mean daily maximum °C (°F) | 28.2 (82.8) | 28.6 (83.5) | 28.4 (83.1) | 28.5 (83.3) | 28.8 (83.8) | 29.0 (84.2) | 29.4 (84.9) | 30.2 (86.4) | 30.1 (86.2) | 29.0 (84.2) | 27.7 (81.9) | 27.8 (82.0) | 28.8 (83.8) |
| Daily mean °C (°F) | 23.1 (73.6) | 23.3 (73.9) | 23.2 (73.8) | 23.2 (73.8) | 23.4 (74.1) | 23.4 (74.1) | 23.7 (74.7) | 24.0 (75.2) | 24.0 (75.2) | 23.2 (73.8) | 22.7 (72.9) | 22.9 (73.2) | 23.4 (74.1) |
| Mean daily minimum °C (°F) | 18.2 (64.8) | 18.3 (64.9) | 18.4 (65.1) | 18.4 (65.1) | 18.5 (65.3) | 18.4 (65.1) | 18.3 (64.9) | 18.4 (65.1) | 18.5 (65.3) | 18.2 (64.8) | 18.3 (64.9) | 18.3 (64.9) | 18.3 (64.9) |
| Average precipitation mm (inches) | 269.6 (10.61) | 255.5 (10.06) | 298.5 (11.75) | 372.1 (14.65) | 304.5 (11.99) | 118.5 (4.67) | 99.9 (3.93) | 94.5 (3.72) | 175.8 (6.92) | 350.5 (13.80) | 396.7 (15.62) | 336.9 (13.26) | 3,068.9 (120.82) |
| Average precipitation days | 17 | 16 | 18 | 19 | 18 | 12 | 11 | 9 | 14 | 20 | 22 | 20 | 195 |
| Average relative humidity (%) | 79 | 77 | 78 | 79 | 78 | 76 | 74 | 71 | 72 | 77 | 81 | 80 | 77 |
Source: Instituto de Hidrologia Meteorologia y Estudios Ambientales
