= Cicuco =

- Municipality and town
- Flag

- Location of the municipality and town of Cicuco in the Bolívar Department of Colombia

- Location in Colombia
- Coordinates: 9°16′N 74°39′W
- Country: Colombia
- Department: Bolívar Department

Area
  - Total: 132 km^{2} (51 sq mi)

Population (Census 2018)
  - Total: 13,120
  - Density: 99.4/km^{2} (257/sq mi)

Cicuco (Spanish pronunciation: [siˈkuko]) is a town and municipality located in the Bolívar Department, northern Colombia.
