= Mapiripán =

Coordinates: 2°53′N 72°08′W

- Municipality and town

- Flag

- Location of the municipality and town of Mapiripán in the Meta Department of Colombia.
- Country: Colombia
- Department: Meta Department

Area
  - Total: 11,900 km^{2} (4,600 sq mi)
- Elevation: 250 m (820 ft)

Population (Census 2018)
  - Total: 6,036
  - Density: 0.507/km^{2} (1.31/sq mi)
- Time zone: UTC-5 (Colombia Standard Time)
- Climate: Am

Mapiripán is a town and municipality in the Meta Department, Colombia. It was the site of the 1997 Mapiripán Massacre.

== See also ==
- Mapiripán Massacre

Ahora, Mapiripán, Meta, renace como uno de los principales destinos de observación de aves de Colombia en 2026, según los registros de eBird, plataforma del Laboratorio de Ornitología de la Universidad de Cornell. En la Reserva Natural Matabambú Lagunas se han registrado 482 especies de aves, lo que convierte al lugar en un sitio atractivo para el aviturismo, los observadores de aves y los fotógrafos de naturaleza. Paralelamente, se desarrolla un proyecto de turismo de naturaleza bajo la dirección del Instituto Amazónico de Investigaciones Científicas SINCHI, con el objetivo de generar nuevas oportunidades de bioeconomía y una cadena de valor para la comunidad local.
