= La Pedrera, Amazonas =

La Pedrera
- Municipality and town
- Location of the municipality and town of La Pedrera, Amazonas in the Amazonas Department of Colombia

- Location in Colombia
- Coordinates: 1°19′S 69°34′W
- Country: Colombia
- Department: Amazonas Department
- Elevation: 180 m (590 ft)

Population
  - Total: 4,985
- Time zone: UTC-5 (Colombia Standard Time)
- Climate: Af

La Pedrera is a non-municipalized area in Colombia, located in the Amazonas department. It has a population of 4,985 inhabitants. It is situated at 100 meters above sea level on the banks of the Caquetá River, serving as a port for this river, and is a few kilometers from the mouth of the Apaporis River. It is located on the border with Brazil, near Vila Bittencourt and São José do Apaporis.

== Proposal for Municipality Status ==
For several years, there has been a proposal to create a Colombian municipality in the Amazonas department, incorporating the non-municipalized areas of Mirití-Paraná, La Victoria, and La Pedrera.

== Geography ==
La Pedrera borders the municipality of Taraira (Vaupés) to the north, the non-municipalized area of Mirití-Paraná to the northwest, Puerto Arica to the southwest, and Tarapacá to the south.

It is surrounded by the Río Puré National Natural Park and the Yaigojé Apaporis National Natural Park.

== History ==
La Pedrera initially began as a Colombian military base. Between July 10 and July 13, 1911, an incident known as the "La Pedrera Conflict" occurred with Peruvian authorities. This led to the establishment of a modus vivendi zone to prevent further confrontations between the two nations. Eleven years later, after long and unsuccessful negotiations between Colombia and Peru, the Salomón-Lozano Treaty was signed on March 24, 1922. This treaty granted Colombia access to the Amazon River and gave Peru a border along the right bank of the Putumayo River.

In September 1998, Conservation International Colombia established the Centro Ambiental La Pedrera as a platform for community engagement and related activities in the Colombian Amazon.

== Climate ==
La Pedrera has a tropical rainforest climate (Köppen Af) with heavy to very heavy rainfall year-round.

Climate data for La Pedrera
Month	Jan	Feb	Mar	Apr	May	Jun	Jul	Aug	Sep	Oct	Nov	Dec	Year
Mean daily maximum °C (°F)	30.4 (86.7)	30.6 (87.1)	30.6 (87.1)	30.6 (87.1)	29.7 (85.5)	29.2 (84.6)	29.4 (84.9)	30.2 (86.4)	30.8 (87.4)	30.7 (87.3)	30.8 (87.4)	30.7 (87.3)	30.3 (86.6)
Daily mean °C (°F)	26.0 (78.8)	26.0 (78.8)	26.0 (78.8)	26.1 (79.0)	25.7 (78.3)	25.1 (77.2)	25.1 (77.2)	25.5 (77.9)	26.0 (78.8)	26.2 (79.2)	26.5 (79.7)	26.1 (79.0)	25.9 (78.6)
Mean daily minimum °C (°F)	21.6 (70.9)	21.4 (70.5)	21.5 (70.7)	21.6 (70.9)	21.7 (71.1)	21.1 (70.0)	20.8 (69.4)	20.9 (69.6)	21.2 (70.2)	21.7 (71.1)	22.2 (72.0)	21.6 (70.9)	21.4 (70.6)
Average rainfall mm (inches)	316.3 (12.45)	270.4 (10.65)	423.8 (16.69)	398.9 (15.70)	426.4 (16.79)	359.9 (14.17)	335.7 (13.22)	293.3 (11.55)	253.9 (10.00)	250.2 (9.85)	304.1 (11.97)	301.2 (11.86)	3,934.1 (154.9)
Average rainy days (≥ 1 mm)	14	12	14	14	16	15	14	13	12	12	12	13	161
Source 1:
Source 2:
