= La Uribe =

Coordinates: 3°14′27″N 74°21′13″W

- Municipality and town
- Flag Coat of arms

- Location of the municipality and town of La Uribe in the Meta Department of Colombia.
- Country: Colombia
- Department: Meta Department

Area
  - Total: 6,037 km^{2} (2,331 sq mi)
- Elevation: 835 m (2,740 ft)

Population (Census 2018)
  - Total: 8,549
  - Density: 1.416/km^{2} (3.668/sq mi)
- Time zone: UTC-5 (Colombia Standard Time)
- Climate: Af

La Uribe is a town and municipality in the Meta Department, Colombia.

== History ==
The population of Uribe goes back to 1886 elevated to municipality in 1921 that included the metropolitan area of San Juan de Arama according to the Decree No. 940 of 1921.

In 1925, Uribe ceased to be a municipality, passing again to corregimiento intendencias. However, within the urban area of Uribe as the oldest. Its name corresponds to the surname of Antonio Uribe, one of the two partners of the latifundist Company Colombia, that with the official permission exploded the immense natural forests of quinine of the region. Its historical antecedents go back approximately to the year 1865 when the quinera company Compañía Colombia, of the company Herrera and Uribe, agreed the construction of a town in order to commercially administrate the extensive vacant territories given in concession by the government, which were abundant in natural forests of rubber and especially of quinine, medicinal element that at that time was in great demand in the international markets.
