= Juradó =

Coordinates: 7.11139°N 77.7714°W

- Municipality and town
- Flag

- Location of the municipality and town of Juradó in the Chocó Department of Colombia.
- Country: Colombia
- Department: Chocó Department

Area
  - Total: 992 km^{2} (383 sq mi)
- Time zone: UTC-5 (Colombia Standard Time)

Juradó (Spanish pronunciation: [xuɾaˈðo]) is the most northwestern municipality and town in Chocó Department, Colombia. It borders on Panama and on the Pacific Ocean.

== Climate ==
Juradó has a tropical monsoon climate (Am in the Köppen climate classification) with moderate rainfall from January to March and heavy to very heavy rainfall in the remaining months. The following climate data is for the town of Juradó.

Climate data for Juradó
Month	Jan	Feb	Mar	Apr	May	Jun	Jul	Aug	Sep	Oct	Nov	Dec	Year
Mean daily maximum °C (°F)	31.1 (88.0)	31.7 (89.1)	31.6 (88.9)	31.5 (88.7)	30.4 (86.7)	30.2 (86.4)	30.3 (86.5)	30.1 (86.2)	29.7 (85.5)	29.2 (84.6)	29.7 (85.5)	30.0 (86.0)	30.5 (86.8)
Daily mean °C (°F)	26.4 (79.5)	26.7 (80.1)	27.1 (80.8)	27.2 (81.0)	26.6 (79.9)	26.4 (79.5)	26.5 (79.7)	26.3 (79.3)	26.1 (79.0)	25.7 (78.3)	25.9 (78.6)	26.1 (79.0)	26.4 (79.6)
Mean daily minimum °C (°F)	21.8 (71.2)	21.8 (71.2)	22.6 (72.7)	23.0 (73.4)	22.9 (73.2)	22.7 (72.9)	22.7 (72.9)	22.5 (72.5)	22.5 (72.5)	22.3 (72.1)	22.2 (72.0)	22.3 (72.1)	22.4 (72.4)
Average precipitation mm (inches)	58 (2.3)	50 (2.0)	70 (2.8)	181 (7.1)	446 (17.6)	412 (16.2)	429 (16.9)	440 (17.3)	376 (14.8)	635 (25.0)	532 (20.9)	311 (12.2)	3,940 (155.1)
Source: Climate-Data.org
