= Mariquita Airport =

Mariquita Airport Aeropuerto Mariquita
- IATA: MQU; ICAO: SKQU

Summary
- Airport type: Public
- Operator: Government
- Serves: Mariquita, Colombia
- Elevation AMSL: 1,531 ft (467 m)
- Coordinates: 05°12′45″N 074°53′01″W

Map
- Location within Colombia

Runways
Direction	Length		Surface
Direction	m	ft	Surface
01/19	1,800	5,906	Asphalt
- Source: WAD GCM Google Maps

Mariquita Airport (Spanish: Aeropuerto Mariquita) (IATA: MQU, ICAO: SKQU) is an airport serving Mariquita, a municipality of the Tolima Department in Colombia. The runway is adjacent to the north side of the town.

The Mariquita VOR-DME (Ident: MQU) is located 2.25 nautical miles (4.17 km) west of the airport.

== See also ==
- Transport in Colombia
- List of airports in Colombia
