= Alberto Lleras Camargo Airport =

Sogamoso Airport
- IATA: SOX; ICAO: SKSO

Summary
- Airport type: Public
- Serves: Sogamoso, Colombia
- Elevation AMSL: 8,155 ft (2,486 m)
- Coordinates: 5°40′35″N 72°58′12″W

Map
- Location within Boyacá Department Location within Colombia

Runways
Direction	Length		Surface
Direction	m	ft	Surface
05/23	1,875	6,152	Asphalt
- Source: GCM Google Maps

Alberto Lleras Camargo Airport (IATA: SOX, ICAO: SKSO) is a high-elevation airport 6 kilometres (3.7 mi) southwest of the city of Sogamoso in the Boyacá Department of Colombia.

The airport and city lie in a broad valley between two north–south ridges of the eastern Colombian Andes mountains. The Sogamoso non-directional beacon (Ident: SOG) is located on the field.

== See also ==
- Transport in Colombia
- List of airports in Colombia
