= Puerto Nare =

- Municipality and town
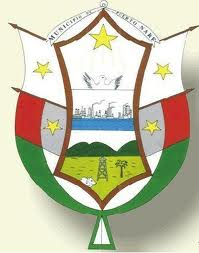
- Flag Coat of arms

- Location of the municipality and town of Puerto Nare in the Antioquia Department of Colombia

- Location in Colombia
- Coordinates: 6°11′30.01″N 74°35′12.12″W
- Country: Colombia
- Department: Antioquia Department
- Subregion: Magdalena Medio

Population (Census 2018)
  - Total: 12,161
- Time zone: UTC-5 (Colombia Standard Time)
- Website: www.puertonare-antioquia.gov.co/

Puerto Nare is a town and municipality in the Colombian department of Antioquia. It is part of the Magdalena Medio Antioquia sub-region.

== Demographics ==
Total Population: 17.539 inhabitants. (2009)

- Urban Population: 7.128
- Rural Population: 10.411

Literacy: 80.7% (2005)

- Urban Zones: 83.3%
- Rural Zones: 79.1%
