= Perales Airport =

Perales Airport Aeropuerto Perales
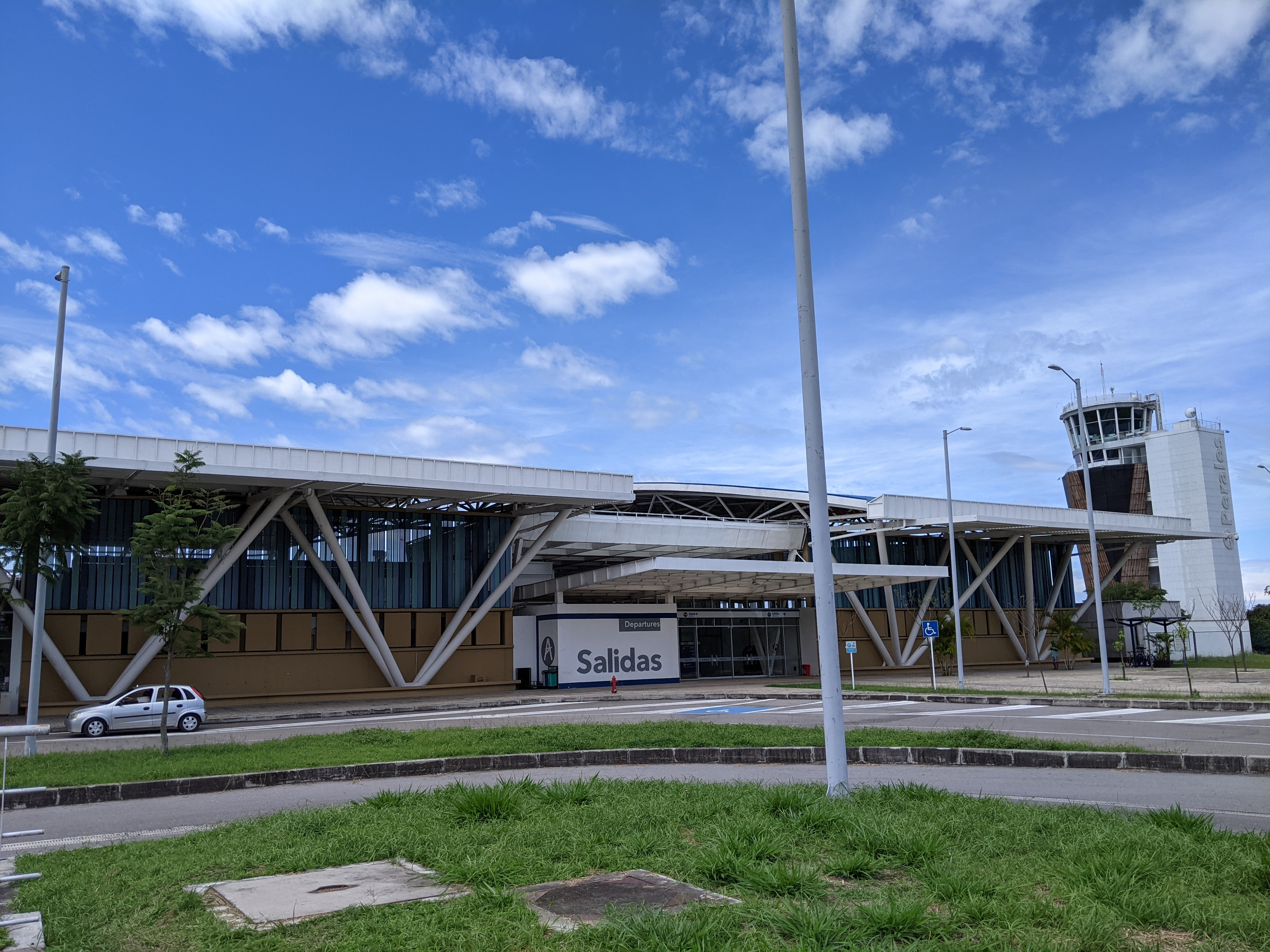
- IATA: IBE; ICAO: SKIB

Summary
- Airport type: Public
- Operator: Aerocivil
- Location: Ibagué, Colombia
- Elevation AMSL: 2,999 ft (914 m)
- Coordinates: 4°25′17″N 75°08′00″W

Map
- Location of airport in Colombia

Runways
| Direction | Length | | Surface |
| Direction | m | ft | Surface |
|---|---|---|---|
| 14/32 | 1,800 | 5,906 | Asphalt |
- Sources: GCM

Perales Airport (IATA: IBE, ICAO: SKIB) is an airport serving the city of Ibagué in the Tolima Department of Colombia. It is 9 kilometres (5.6 mi) east of the city. A major renovation of the airport was completed in June 2018.

== Airlines and destinations ==
| Airlines | Destinations |
|---|---|
| Avianca | Bogotá |
| Clic | Bogotá, Medellin–Olaya Herrera; Seasonal: Cartagena (begins 18 December 2026) |
| LATAM Colombia | Bogotá |

== See also ==
- Transport in Colombia
- List of airports in Colombia
