= Taraira =

Coordinates: 0°33′39″S 69°38′1″W

- Municipality and town
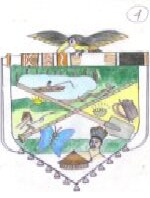
- Flag Coat of arms

- Location of the municipality and town of Taraira in the Vaupés Department of Colombia.
- Country: Colombia
- Department: Vaupés Department

Government
  - Mayor: César Mauricio Martínez Delgado

Population
  - Total: 976
  - Density: 2,015/km^{2} (5,220/sq mi)
- Time zone: UTC-5 (Colombia Standard Time)

Taraira is a town and municipality located in the Vaupés Department, Republic of Colombia.
