= El Charco =

Coordinates: 2°28′39″N 78°6′40″W

- Municipality and town
- Flag Coat of arms

- Location of the municipality and town of El Charco in the Nariño Department of Colombia.
- Country: Colombia
- Department: Nariño Department
- Founded: October 16, 1886

Government
  - Mayor: Milton Cuero Tejada

Area
  - Municipality and town: 2,485 km^{2} (959 sq mi)

Population (2016)
  - Municipality and town: 38,207
  - Density: 15.38/km^{2} (39.8/sq mi)
  - Urban: 10,461
- Time zone: UTC-5 (Colombia Standard Time)

El Charco is a town and municipality in the Nariño Department, Colombia.

== Climate ==
El Charco has a tropical rainforest climate (Af) with heavy to very heavy rainfall year-round.

Climate data for El Charco
Month	Jan	Feb	Mar	Apr	May	Jun	Jul	Aug	Sep	Oct	Nov	Dec	Year
Mean daily maximum °C (°F)	29.1 (84.4)	30.1 (86.2)	30.4 (86.7)	30.1 (86.2)	30.0 (86.0)	30.0 (86.0)	29.8 (85.6)	29.7 (85.5)	29.4 (84.9)	28.6 (83.5)	28.8 (83.8)	29.2 (84.6)	29.6 (85.3)
Daily mean °C (°F)	25.7 (78.3)	26.1 (79.0)	26.3 (79.3)	26.3 (79.3)	26.4 (79.5)	26.1 (79.0)	25.9 (78.6)	26.0 (78.8)	25.8 (78.4)	25.7 (78.3)	25.7 (78.3)	25.6 (78.1)	26.0 (78.7)
Mean daily minimum °C (°F)	22.3 (72.1)	22.1 (71.8)	22.3 (72.1)	22.6 (72.7)	22.8 (73.0)	22.2 (72.0)	22.1 (71.8)	22.3 (72.1)	22.3 (72.1)	22.8 (73.0)	22.7 (72.9)	22.1 (71.8)	22.4 (72.3)
Average rainfall mm (inches)	322 (12.7)	294 (11.6)	254 (10.0)	333 (13.1)	524 (20.6)	491 (19.3)	343 (13.5)	314 (12.4)	395 (15.6)	377 (14.8)	292 (11.5)	260 (10.2)	4,199 (165.3)
