= Sabana de Torres =

Coordinates: 7°24′N 73°30′W

- Municipality and town
- Flag Seal

- Location of the municipality and town of Sabana de Torres in the Santander Department of Colombia.
- Country: Colombia
- Department: Santander Department

Area
  - Municipality and town: 1,403 km^{2} (542 sq mi)
  - Urban: 5.59 km^{2} (2.16 sq mi)

Population (2018 census)
  - Municipality and town: 33,055
  - Density: 23.56/km^{2} (61.02/sq mi)
  - Urban: 22,512
  - Urban density: 4,030/km^{2} (10,400/sq mi)
- Time zone: UTC-5 (Colombia Standard Time)

Sabana de Torres is a town and municipality in the Santander Department in northeastern Colombia.

== Climate ==
Climate data for Sabana de Torres (Villa Leiva), elevation 328 m (1,076 ft), (1981–2010)
Month	Jan	Feb	Mar	Apr	May	Jun	Jul	Aug	Sep	Oct	Nov	Dec	Year
Mean daily maximum °C (°F)	34.1 (93.4)	34.8 (94.6)	34.6 (94.3)	33.7 (92.7)	33.2 (91.8)	33.3 (91.9)	33.6 (92.5)	33.6 (92.5)	33.0 (91.4)	32.6 (90.7)	32.4 (90.3)	33.1 (91.6)	33.5 (92.3)
Daily mean °C (°F)	27.7 (81.9)	28.4 (83.1)	28.3 (82.9)	27.8 (82.0)	27.7 (81.9)	27.7 (81.9)	27.8 (82.0)	27.7 (81.9)	27.4 (81.3)	27.0 (80.6)	27.0 (80.6)	27.2 (81.0)	27.6 (81.7)
Mean daily minimum °C (°F)	22.5 (72.5)	22.8 (73.0)	23.2 (73.8)	23.4 (74.1)	23.3 (73.9)	23.3 (73.9)	23.0 (73.4)	22.9 (73.2)	22.8 (73.0)	22.9 (73.2)	23.1 (73.6)	22.9 (73.2)	23.0 (73.4)
Average precipitation mm (inches)	43.4 (1.71)	85.8 (3.38)	175.1 (6.89)	287.2 (11.31)	305.5 (12.03)	227.7 (8.96)	207.1 (8.15)	273.6 (10.77)	288.1 (11.34)	410.9 (16.18)	292.2 (11.50)	118.6 (4.67)	2,696.6 (106.17)
Average precipitation days	4	7	10	17	18	15	14	16	18	19	16	8	160
Average relative humidity (%)	81	78	79	83	84	84	82	83	84	86	86	84	83
Mean monthly sunshine hours	232.5	183.5	155.0	141.0	158.1	168.0	198.4	192.2	171.0	164.3	165.0	201.5	2,130.5
Mean daily sunshine hours	7.5	6.5	5.0	4.7	5.1	5.6	6.4	6.2	5.7	5.3	5.5	6.5	5.8
Source: Instituto de Hidrologia Meteorologia y Estudios Ambientales
