= Cimitarra =

Coordinates: 6°19′N 73°57′W

- Municipality and town
- Flag

- Location of the municipality and town of Cimitarra in the Santander Department of Colombia.
- Country: Colombia
- Department: Santander Department

Population (2020 est.)
  - Total: 50,892
- Time zone: UTC-5 (Colombia Standard Time)

Cimitarra is a town and municipality in the Santander Department in northeastern Colombia.

== Climate ==
Cimitarra has a tropical rainforest climate (Köppen: Af).

Climate data for Cimitarra, elevation 300 m (980 ft), (1981–2010)
Month	Jan	Feb	Mar	Apr	May	Jun	Jul	Aug	Sep	Oct	Nov	Dec	Year
Mean daily maximum °C (°F)	31.9 (89.4)	32.1 (89.8)	31.8 (89.2)	31.8 (89.2)	31.6 (88.9)	31.7 (89.1)	32.0 (89.6)	32.1 (89.8)	31.8 (89.2)	31.4 (88.5)	31.4 (88.5)	31.5 (88.7)	31.7 (89.1)
Daily mean °C (°F)	27.2 (81.0)	27.2 (81.0)	27.2 (81.0)	27.0 (80.6)	27.1 (80.8)	27.1 (80.8)	27.3 (81.1)	27.3 (81.1)	27.1 (80.8)	26.9 (80.4)	26.9 (80.4)	27.0 (80.6)	27.1 (80.8)
Mean daily minimum °C (°F)	22.2 (72.0)	22.2 (72.0)	22.3 (72.1)	22.2 (72.0)	22.1 (71.8)	22.1 (71.8)	21.8 (71.2)	21.9 (71.4)	21.9 (71.4)	21.8 (71.2)	22.0 (71.6)	22.2 (72.0)	22.1 (71.8)
Average precipitation mm (inches)	125.3 (4.93)	157.0 (6.18)	261.6 (10.30)	307.3 (12.10)	281.3 (11.07)	183.3 (7.22)	160.3 (6.31)	194.8 (7.67)	278.5 (10.96)	343.2 (13.51)	320.0 (12.60)	194.9 (7.67)	2,714.7 (106.88)
Average precipitation days	9	11	15	17	18	16	16	17	18	19	17	13	180
Average relative humidity (%)	84	84	85	85	85	85	84	84	84	85	85	85	85
Mean monthly sunshine hours	186.0	163.7	136.4	147.0	176.7	183.0	204.6	207.7	180.0	176.7	165.0	173.6	2,100.4
Mean daily sunshine hours	6.0	5.8	4.4	4.9	5.7	6.1	6.6	6.7	6.0	5.7	5.5	5.6	5.8
Source: Instituto de Hidrologia Meteorologia y Estudios Ambientales
