= List of airports by ICAO code: SQ =

List of airports by ICAO code: A - B - C - D - EB-EG - EH-EY - FA-FM - FN-FZ - G - H - ~~I~~ - J - KA-KH - KI-KP - KR-KZ - LA-LJ - LK-LZ - M - N - O - P - Q - R - SA-SC - SD-SH - SI - SJ - SK-SM - SN-SP - SQ - SS-SU - SV-SY - T - U - V - W - ~~X~~ - Y - Z

== SQ - Colombia ==
Also see airport category and list.

ICAO	IATA	Airport name	Community	Coordinates	Notes
SQAA		Santa Ana de San Luis de Palenque Aerodrome	San Luis de Palenque	05°05′16″N 071°47′19″W	
SQAB		Aguas Blancas Aerodrome	San Martín	07°49′13″N 073°34′20″W	
SQAC		Casa Coima Aerodrome	Mutatá	07°26′33″N 076°35′31″W	
SQAD		Sala 77 Aerodrome	Valledupar	10°21′08″N 073°19′47″W	
SQAE		Las Américas Heliport	Santa Marta	11°12′57″N 074°13′05″W	Closed
SQAF		Guafitas Aerodrome	Orocué	05°04′45″N 071°57′16″W	Closed
SQAG		El Limonar Aerodrome	Campoalegre	02°37′26″N 075°21′45″W	
SQAH		Canarias Aerodrome	Nunchía	05°28′19″N 072°09′12″W	
SQAI		Curalito Aerodrome	Valledupar	10°16′23″N 073°16′47″W	Closed
SQAJ		La Mejor Aerodrome	Restrepo	04°09′14″N 073°19′14″W	
SQAK		Aguas Claras de Sabana de Torres Aerodrome	Sabana de Torres	07°16′23″N 073°33′45″W	
SQAL		Banco de la República Heliport	Palmira	03°38′03″N 076°24′32″W	Closed
SQAM		Manare Aerodrome	Paz de Ariporo	05°58′35″N 070°09′26″W	
SQAN		San Pablo de la Pedrera Aerodrome	La Pedrera	00°46′59″S 070°19′22″W	Closed
SQAO		El Cairo de Castilla La Nueva Aerodrome	Castilla la Nueva	03°46′23″N 073°23′09″W	
SQAP		San Felipe de Orocué Aerodrome	Orocué	05°06′13″N 071°50′33″W	
SQAQ		Santillana Aerodrome	Caucasia	08°02′46″N 074°55′18″W	
SQAR		Isa Heliport	Palmira	03°32′16″N 076°24′04″W	Closed
SQAS		Asa San Martin Aerodrome	Riohacha	11°17′20″N 073°10′16″W	
SQAT		Los Patos Aerodrome	Trinidad	05°13′39″N 071°02′00″W	
SQAU		La Aurora Heliport	La Apartada	08°02′10″N 075°19′26″W	Closed
SQAV		Aniversario Aerodrome	El Espinal, Tolima	04°07′16″N 074°54′46″W	
SQAW		El Algarrobo Aerodrome	San Marcos	08°30′04″N 075°04′15″W	
SQAX		La Preciosa Aerodrome	Trinidad	05°24′48″N 071°29′17″W	
SQAY		El Arenal Aerodrome	Yopal	05°11′37″N 072°17′54″W	Closed
SQAZ		Santa Cruz Aerodrome	Puerto López	04°07′55″N 073°11′54″W	
SQBB		La Bendicion de Arauca Aerodrome	Arauca	06°56′58″N 070°45′22″W	
SQBC		Bocas de Satinga Aerodrome	Olaya Herrera	02°21′00″N 078°19′00″W	Coordinates unverified
SQBD		Betania Aerodrome	Trinidad	05°32′03″N 071°41′08″W	
SQBE		Bethania Aerodrome	El Copey	10°06′56″N 073°56′48″W	
SQBF		Caño Blanco Aerodrome	Fuente de Oro	03°18′36″N 073°32′30″W	
SQBG		La Bastilla Aerodrome	Guamo	04°05′28″N 074°54′26″W	
SQBH		Bucaramanga Fire Station Heliport	Bucaramanga	07°06′49″N 073°07′45″W	
SQBI		Las Brisas Aerodrome	Villavicencio	04°03′45″N 073°24′44″W	
SQBJ		La Libelula Aerodrome	Cajicá	04°55′11″N 074°03′22″W	
SQBK		Belén de Inambú Aerodrome	Mitú	00°28′15″N 070°11′05″W	
SQBL		Balmoral Aerodrome	Maní	04°53′16″N 072°20′45″W	
SQBM		Bogota Fire Corps Special Administrative Unit Heliport	Bogotá	04°38′45″N 074°06′47″W	
SQBN		La Bendicion Aerodrome	La Primavera	06°03′46″N 069°10′42″W	
SQBP		Barlovento Aerodrome	San Luis de Palenque	05°06′05″N 071°16′57″W	
SQBQ		Bocoa Querari Aerodrome	Papunahua	01°35′51″N 070°47′58″W	
SQBR		El Zamuro Aerodrome	Yopal	05°08′57″N 072°21′06″W	
SQBS		Barinas Aerodrome	Tauramena	04°57′52″N 072°37′42″W	
SQBT		Los Lobos Aerodrome	Tauramena	04°35′51″N 072°39′07″W	
SQBU		Baru Heliport	Cartagena	10°12′37″N 075°37′00″W	
SQBV		Berlin Aerodrome	Villavieja	03°24′09″N 075°10′25″W	Closed
SQBW		Bucarelia Aerodrome	Puerto Wilches	07°15′04″N 073°51′48″W	
SQBX		Sabanalarga Aerodrome	Sabanalarga	04°51′13″N 073°02′10″W	Closed
SQBY		Los Cabros Aerodrome	Yopal	05°26′39″N 072°14′04″W	
SQBZ		Bella Cruz Aerodrome	La Gloria	08°37′16″N 073°43′34″W	
SQCA		Central Castilla Aerodrome	Pradera	03°21′42″N 076°16′59″W	
SQCB		La Cabaña de Aipe	Aipe	03°10′30″N 075°23′55″W	Closed
SQCC		Bogota Chamber of Commerce Heliport	Bogotá	04°39′26″N 074°06′23″W	
SQCD		La Concordia de Tauramena Aerodrome	Tauramena	04°55′51″N 072°38′30″W	
SQCE		Cerrejon Central Aerodrome	Barrancas	11°02′17″N 072°41′42″W	
SQCF		Santa Maria del Café Aerodrome	Hato Corozal	06°06′40″N 070°59′20″W	
SQCG		Calima Aerodrome	Aguachica	08°17′07″N 073°38′35″W	
SQCH		Morichito Aerodrome	Hato Corozal	05°55′08″N 071°47′36″W	
SQCI		El Cairo de Hato Corozal Aerodrome	Hato Corozal	06°03′35″N 071°12′00″W	
SQCJ		San José de Ocune Aerodrome	Cumaribo	04°04′56″N 070°15′14″W	Closed
SQCK		La Cheka Aerodrome	Zona Bananera	10°39′54″N 074°11′48″W	
SQCL		ICP Ecopetrol Heliport	Piedecuesta	07°00′24″N 073°03′09″W	
SQCM		Cabo Marzo Aerodrome	Juradó	06°52′46″N 077°40′41″W	
SQCN		Corral Nuevo Aerodrome	Plato	09°41′37″N 074°38′45″W	Closed
SQCO		Colombaima Aerodrome	Beltrán	04°44′21″N 074°48′18″W	Also SQRC
SQCP		Campo Alegre de Valledupar Aerodrome	Valledupar	10°38′51″N 073°08′53″W	
SQCQ		El Cedrito Aerodrome	Armenia	04°32′08″N 075°43′25″W	Closed
SQCR		Cofa Roldanillo Heliport	Roldanillo	04°24′49″N 076°08′36″W	
SQCS		Cravo Sur Aerodrome	Orocué	04°49′37″N 071°39′46″W	
SQCT		Campo Estero Aerodrome	Maní	04°40′35″N 072°07′25″W	Closed
SQCU		Cuatro Vientos Aerodrome	Melgar	04°13′08″N 074°43′40″W	
SQCV		Cavasa Aerodrome	Candelaria	03°24′34″N 076°24′25″W	Closed
SQCW		Cumachagua Aerodrome	Cumaribo	04°01′00″N 070°53′00″W	Coordinates unverified
SQCX		Monaco Aerodrome	Paz de Ariporo	05°41′50″N 071°16′17″W	Closed
SQCY		Costa Rica Aerodrome	Cabuyaro	04°23′00″N 073°02′32″W	Closed
SQCZ		Corozito Aerodrome	San Martín	03°20′06″N 072°34′50″W	
SQDA		San Luis de Paca Aerodrome	Mitú	00°52′28″N 070°20′47″W	
SQDB		Los Condores Aerodrome	Pereira	04°48′01″N 075°50′13″W	Closed
SQDC		Calma El Darién Aerodrome	Calima	03°57′00″N 076°31′00″W	Coordinates unverified
SQDD		La Esmeralda de Candelaria	Candelaria	03°22′45″N 076°23′46″W	
SQDE		Mafe Aerodrome	Paz de Ariporo	05°28′04″N 071°15′06″W	
SQDG		La Mansión Aerodrome	San Carlos de Guaroa	03°55′01″N 073°13′35″W	
SQDH		El Desecho Aerodrome	Nunchía	05°37′10″N 072°03′50″W	
SQDI		La Concordia de Repelón Aerodrome	Repelón	10°28′01″N 075°07′40″W	
SQDL		La Dalia Aerodrome	Arauca	06°58′07″N 070°57′43″W	
SQDM		Morichal Viejo Aerodrome	El Retorno	02°14′41″N 070°02′06″W	
SQDN		El Eden Aerodrome	Cabuyaro	04°18′15″N 073°04′27″W	
SQDO		El Soñador Aerodrome	Aguazul	05°13′40″N 072°27′09″W	
SQDP		La Redención Aerodrome	Pore	05°39′43″N 071°48′32″W	
SQDQ		Banco de la Republica Condoto Heliport	Condoto	05°06′00″N 076°38′58″W	
SQDR		Calderas Heliport	San Carlos	06°09′32″N 075°02′21″W	
SQDS		Santa Debora Heliport	Medellín	06°15′54″N 075°33′20″W	Closed
SQDT		El Diamante de Alvarado Aerodrome	Alvarado	04°33′08″N 074°56′10″W	Closed
SQDU		Dumacita Aerodrome	Maní	04°28′55″N 072°02′24″W	
SQDV		La Esmeralda de Villavicencio Aerodrome	Villavicencio	04°05′03″N 073°21′51″W	
SQDZ		Fadeco Aerodrome	Agustín Codazzi	10°00′38″N 073°14′52″W	Closed
SQEA		Cali Municipal Administrative Centre Heliport	Cali	03°27′23″N 076°32′13″W	Closed
SQEB		Banco de Occidente Building Heliport	Bogotá	04°36′54″N 074°04′16″W	
SQEC		Colpatria Tower Heliport	Bogotá	04°36′40″N 074°04′13″W	
SQED		El Delirio Aerodrome	Arauca	06°58′59″N 070°52′55″W	
SQEE		La Estrella de Puerto Lleras Aerodrome	Puerto Lleras	03°28′49″N 073°19′39″W	
SQEF		El Triunfo de Ambalema Aerodrome	Ambalema	04°51′55″N 074°48′13″W	
SQEG		Colegial Aerodrome	Villanueva	04°29′40″N 072°46′19″W	
SQEH		El Capricho Aerodrome	Puerto Gaitán	04°12′08″N 072°09′50″W	
SQEI		El Santuario Aerodrome	Ambalema	04°54′10″N 074°46′47″W	
SQEJ		Madrevieja Aerodrome	Nunchía	05°27′44″N 071°57′30″W	
SQEK		La Estrella de Guacarí Aerodrome	Guacarí	03°45′47″N 076°20′59″W	Closed
SQEL		Banco de la República Quibdó Heliport	Quibdó	05°41′51″N 076°39′54″W	Closed
SQEM		El Marne Aerodrome	Sabana de Torres	07°25′24″N 073°22′50″W	
SQEN		El Medano Aerodrome	Villanueva	04°34′39″N 072°53′07″W	Closed
SQEO		El Cimarrón Airport	La Primavera	05°56′13″N 069°15′28″W	
SQEP		El Porvenir de Sabana de Torres	Sabana de Torres	07°18′37″N 073°34′43″W	Closed
SQEQ		El Recreo Aerodrome	San Luis de Palenque	05°19′12″N 071°34′43″W	
SQER		Buenos Aires de Pacoa Aerdorome	Pacoa	00°01′13″N 071°00′27″W	
SQES		Remache Sur Aerodrome	San Luis de Palenque	05°04′59″N 071°09′09″W	
SQET		Ecopetrol Heliport	Barrancabermeja	07°04′39″N 073°51′54″W	
SQEU		Emaus Aerodrome	San Luis de Palenque	05°08′27″N 071°02′23″W	
SQEV		Helivalle Heliport	Palmira	03°33′32″N 076°18′23″W	Closed
SQEX		El Brillante Aerodrome	Planeta Rica	08°20′22″N 075°33′22″W	Closed
SQEY		Mararey Aerodrome	Orocué	04°49′38″N 071°41′54″W	
SQEZ		El Zamuro Aerodrome	Yopal	05°07′28″N 072°20′13″W	Closed
SQFA		Las Furias Aerodrome	Nunchía	05°24′16″N 072°07′24″W	
SQFB		Fabal Coalcesar Aerodrome	Gamarra	08°14′30″N 073°41′24″W	
SQFC		Falcón Aerodrome	Saldaña	03°55′00″N 075°01′00″W	Coordinates unverified
SQFD		La Fundación Aerodrome	Villanueva	04°22′30″N 072°44′56″W	
SQFE		La Fé de la Zona Bananera Aerodrome	Zona Bananera	10°51′40″N 074°10′17″W	
SQFF		Aeroflandes Aerodrome	Flandes	04°13′02″N 074°50′44″W	
SQFG		Colombia Attorney General Heliport	Bogotá	04°38′31″N 074°06′12″W	Closed
SQFH		New Usme Hospital Heliport	Bogotá	04°29′21″N 074°06′36″W	
SQFL		La Florida Aerodrome	San Carlos de Guaroa	03°54′54″N 073°17′58″W	Closed
SQFM		La Base Fumivalle Aerodrome	Guacarí	03°46′36″N 076°19′18″W	
SQFN		San Francisco de Puerto Gaitán Aerodrome	Puerto Gaitán	04°15′36″N 071°54′52″W	
SQFO		La Reforma de Nunchía Aerodrome	Nunchía	05°25′44″N 072°09′47″W	
SQFP		COFA Palmira Heliport	Palmira	03°30′53″N 076°18′20″W	Closed
SQFQ		El Triunfo de Antioquia Aerodrome	Puerto Triunfo	05°55′20″N 074°43′33″W	
SQFR		La Francia Aerodrome	El Paso	09°38′35″N 073°31′37″W	
SQFS		Fasca Aerodrome	Aguazul	05°09′09″N 072°31′02″W	
SQFT		La Fortaleza Aerodrome	Paz de Ariporo	05°47′43″N 071°45′26″W	
SQFU		La Fortuna Aerodrome 1	San Martín	03°36′35″N 072°20′33″W	
SQFZ		La Fazenda Aerodrome	Puerto López	04°19′36″N 072°13′14″W	
SQGA		Antioquia Government Heliport	Medellín	06°14′38″N 075°34′24″W	
SQGB		ING Barings Heliport	Bogotá	04°39′38″N 074°03′16″W	
SQGC		Agua Blanca del Espinal Aerodrome	El Espinal	04°11′02″N 074°53′34″W	
SQGD		Praga Aerodrome	Obando	04°35′08″N 075°58′07″W	
SQGE		Germania Aerodrome	Barrancabermeja	08°19′50″N 073°41′41″W	
SQGF		Algarrobo Fanor	Algarrobo	10°14′09″N 074°03′13″W	Closed
SQGG		La Ceiba de la Zona Bananera Aerodrome	Zona Bananera	10°47′28″N 074°06′17″W	
SQGH		Los Guires Aerodrome	Hato Corozal	06°11′07″N 071°31′16″W	
SQGI		Los Gansos Aerodrome	Cumaribo	04°40′45″N 070°59′56″W	
SQGJ		Calamar Aerodrome	Calamar	01°57′45″N 072°38′42″W	
SQGK		L. Legua Aerodrome	Cerro San Antonio	10°20′09″N 074°50′01″W	Closed
SQGL		Agua Blanca de Piedras Aerodrome	Piedras	04°27′56″N 074°59′42″W	
SQGM		El Progreso Aerodrome	Granada	03°28′40″N 073°43′50″W	
SQGN		Los Milagros Aerodrome	Maní	04°47′53″N 072°14′00″W	
SQGO		Banco Lagro Aerodrome	Nunchía	05°27′51″N 072°03′54″W	
SQGP		Guanapalo Aerodrome	Orocué	05°10′27″N 071°25′48″W	
SQGQ		Portugalito Aerodrome	Armenia	04°24′04″N 075°46′23″W	
SQGR		Loma Grande Aerodrome	Ayapel	08°17′37″N 075°07′03″W	
SQGS		Grismania Aerodrome	Aguazul	04°59′22″N 072°30′32″W	
SQGU		Gavilan de la Pascua Aerodrome	La Primavera	05°07′00″N 070°22′50″W	
SQGV		Gavanes Aerodrome	Cabuyaro	04°12′28″N 072°58′56″W	
SQGW		Los Ángeles Aerodrome	Mitú	00°34′36″N 070°07′48″W	
SQGY		Guanayas Aerodrome	Fuente de Oro	03°21′11″N 073°34′14″W	
SQGZ		Las Garzas Aerodrome	Buga	03°45′04″N 075°56′51″W	Closed
SQHA		Hato La Aurora Aerodrome	Hato Corozal	06°01′59″N 071°22′55″W	Closed
SQHB		Nunchía Los Libertadores Aerodrome	Nunchía	05°37′52″N 072°11′59″W	
SQHC		Los Halcones Aerodrome	Buga	03°55′04″N 076°19′14″W	
SQHD		Rancho Grande Aerodrome	Ibagué	04°26′31″N 075°06′59″W	
SQHE		Hato Veladero Aerodrome	San Luis de Palenque	05°17′22″N 072°05′01″W	
SQHF		Halcones Aerodrome	Fuente de Oro	03°22′24″N 073°36′50″W	
SQHG		Engativá Hospital Heliport	Bogotá	04°42′38″N 074°06′36″W	
SQHH		La Chapa Aerodrome	Hato Corozal	05°56′00″N 071°27′00″W	Coordinates unverified
SQHI		Medellín General Hospital Heliport	Medellín	06°14′05″N 075°34′22″W	
SQHJ		Colombia International Hospital Heliport	Piedecuesta	07°02′08″N 073°04′07″W	
SQHK		Hatico Aerodrome	Maní	04°33′54″N 072°03′33″W	
SQHL		Helice Aerodrome	San Carlos de Guaroa	03°56′53″N 073°23′16″W	Closed
SQHM		Chambimbal Aerodrome	San Pedro	03°58′23″N 076°16′39″W	Closed
SQHN		La Campechana Aerodrome	Maní	04°53′06″N 072°18′10″W	
SQHO		Heli Air Rionegro Heliport	Rionegro	06°10′54″N 075°26′02″W	
SQHP		Chapinero Aerodrome	Ituango	07°20′49″N 076°04′47″W	Closed
SQHQ		Rancho Aéreo Aerodrome	Sopetrán	06°31′24″N 075°48′29″W	
SQHR		Las Américas Hotel Heliport	Cartagena	10°27′34″N 075°30′25″W	
SQHS		Chicoral Estra Aerodrome	El Espinal	04°12′07″N 074°58′11″W	
SQHT		Hato de Opia Aerodrome	Piedras	04°25′24″N 075°00′05″W	Closed
SQHU		Los Mochuelos Aerodrome	Cereté	08°54′36″N 075°47′59″W	
SQHV		Cachiporro Aerodrome	Pacoa	00°33′15″N 071°55′35″W	
SQHX		Hacienda Cascabeles Aerodrome	Puerto Gaitán	04°12′52″N 071°56′33″W	
SQHY		Hacienda La Joya Aerodrome	Córdoba	09°37′05″N 074°50′12″W	
SQHZ		El Moriche Aerodrome	Aguazul	05°00′56″N 072°24′25″W	Closed
SQIA		Lima Aerodrome	Algarrobo	10°22′59″N 074°06′26″W	
SQIB		Cerritos Aerodrome	Ambalema	04°50′30″N 074°46′33″W	
SQIC		Ingenio Incauca Aerodrome	Miranda	03°16′08″N 076°20′03″W	
SQID		San Isidro Aerodrome	Puerto López	04°07′39″N 073°14′18″W	
SQIE		El Ariete Aerodrome	Montenegro	04°30′15″N 075°48′30″W	
SQIF		Villa Fátima Aerodrome	Mitú	00°58′28″N 069°57′25″W	
SQIG		Ibacaba Aerodrome	Yavaraté	00°58′13″N 069°12′47″W	
SQIH		Ingenio Pichichi Aerodrome	Guacarí	03°46′07″N 076°16′37″W	
SQII		El Aceituno Aerodrome	Ibagué	04°20′44″N 075°01′22″W	
SQIJ		El Carmen de Chucurí Aerodrome	El Carmen de Chucurí	06°44′26″N 073°33′16″W	
SQIK		Teresita Aerodrome	Yavaraté	00°44′17″N 069°28′17″W	
SQIL		La Diana Aerodrome	Castilla la Nueva	03°48′17″N 073°31′13″W	
SQIM		Ingenio Manuelita Aerodrome	Palmira	03°35′55″N 076°18′21″W	
SQIN		La Ceiba de San Martín Aerodrome	San Martín	03°41′20″N 073°13′57″W	Closed
SQIO		El Paraíso de la Primavera Aerodrome	La Primavera	05°10′57″N 069°37′49″W	
SQIP		La Palestina de Caldas Aerodrome	Palestina	05°02′00″N 075°37′13″W	Closed
SQIQ		Tequendama International Centre Heliport	Bogotá	04°36′52″N 074°04′12″W	
SQIR		El Cairano Aerodrome	Santa Catalina	10°42′46″N 075°15′53″W	
SQIS		San Luis de la Esperanza Aerodrome	La Esperanza	07°38′17″N 073°26′17″W	
SQIT		Asta Aerodrome	El Espinal	04°09′02″N 074°52′16″W	Closed
SQIU		Villa Nueva Aerodrome	Pacoa	00°16′24″N 070°26′57″W	
SQIV		Ingenio Providencia Aerodrome	El Cerrito	03°38′18″N 076°18′17″W	
SQIX		Ingenio del Occidente Aerodrome	Villa Rica	03°08′07″N 076°27′10″W	
SQIY		Tio Bayo Aerodrome	Maní	04°53′05″N 072°22′01″W	Closed
SQIZ		San Marino Aerodrome	Bolívar	04°22′27″N 076°27′28″W	Closed
SQJA		Jaguas Heliport	San Rafael	06°21′01″N 074°59′53″W	
SQJC		Jibici Aerodrome	Cumaribo	04°53′23″N 068°21′29″W	
SQJF		San Jeronimo Aerodrome	Flandes	04°11′35″N 074°51′41″W	
SQJG		El Coraje Aerodrome	Sabanas de San Ángel	10°01′30″N 074°04′01″W	
SQJH		Mahanaim Aerodrome	Puerto Gaitán	04°20′58″N 071°55′08″W	
SQJI		La Plata Puerto Trujillo Aerodrome	Puerto Gaitán	03°29′14″N 071°22′33″W	
SQJK		San Camilo Aerodrome	Cumaribo	04°30′34″N 070°31′06″W	
SQJL		Julia Carolina Aerodrome	Bosconia	09°56′32″N 073°52′05″W	Closed
SQJM		Garza Morichal Aerodrome	Morichal Nuevo	02°15′29″N 069°54′47″W	
SQJN		El Juncal Aerodrome	Palermo	02°50′50″N 075°18′48″W	
SQJP		El Placer Aerodrome	Cumaribo	04°52′58″N 069°04′25″W	
SQJQ		San Juan de Urabá Aerodrome	San Juan de Urabá	08°47′00″N 076°30′00″W	Coordinates unverified
SQJR		Maria Alejandra Aerodrome	Nunchía	05°28′55″N 072°05′03″W	
SQJS		Las Juanas Aerodrome	Castilla la Nueva	03°49′24″N 073°31′56″W	
SQJT		San Juan de San Martín Aerodrome	San Martín	03°42′06″N 073°22′39″W	Closed
SQJU		Julian Aerodrome	Cabuyaro	04°16′16″N 072°59′13″W	
SQJY		Jutuvey Aerodrome	San Martín	03°20′06″N 072°34′49″W	
SQKA		Akae Aerodrome	La Primavera	05°13′54″N 070°05′31″W	
SQKB		El Cabrestero Aerodrome	Paz de Ariporo	05°29′19″N 071°12′37″W	
SQKC		Capri Heliport 1	Tame	06°24′04″N 071°44′10″W	
SQKF		COFA Montenegro Heliport	Montenegro	04°30′30″N 075°47′11″W	Closed
SQKG		Punta Tigre Aerodrome	Pana Pana	01°43′40″N 069°45′40″W	
SQKI		Las Catios Aerodrome	Turbo	08°02′09″N 076°39′06″W	Closed
SQKK		Las Candelarias Aerodrome	Majagual	08°27′44″N 074°48′16″W	
SQKL		Montecarlo Aerodrome	Orocué	04°43′20″N 071°54′26″W	
SQKM		Kamanaos Aerodrome	Pana Pana	01°43′26″N 069°50′17″W	
SQKO		Colomba Aerodrome	Yotoco	03°45′26″N 076°24′46″W	
SQKP		Labrador Aerodrome	El Copey	10°05′35″N 074°03′46″W	
SQKQ		La Tranquera Aerodrome	Puerto López	03°59′36″N 072°25′41″W	
SQKS		Los Campanos Aerodrome	Tubará	10°52′57″N 075°01′56″W	
SQKT		Caprichito de Luna Aerodrome	Paz de Ariporo	06°00′00″N 071°15′23″W	
SQKV		Venado Isana Aerodrome	Pana Pana	01°44′01″N 069°24′09″W	
SQKW		Las Camasas Aerodrome	Yopal	05°01′19″N 072°00′06″W	
SQKZ		Banco de la República Caucasia Heliport	Caucasia	07°59′23″N 075°11′52″W	Closed
SQLA		La Fé del Copey Aerodrome	El Copey	10°07′50″N 074°02′22″W	
SQLB		La Cabaña de Cumaral Aerodrome	Cumaral	04°17′58″N 073°21′48″W	
SQLC		La Cascajera Aerodrome	Barrancabermeja	07°10′02″N 073°34′39″W	
SQLD		Garibaldy Aerodrome	Yopal	05°01′37″N 072°17′20″W	
SQLE		Villanueva de Turbo Aerodrome	Turbo	07°58′18″N 076°37′47″W	Closed
SQLF		La Floresta Aerodrome	Yaguará	02°37′47″N 075°34′34″W	Closed
SQLG		Las Aguilas Aerodrome	Yumbo	03°30′48″N 076°29′39″W	
SQLH		La Hermosa Aerodrome	Paz de Ariporo	05°31′51″N 070°26′59″W	
SQLI		La Cacica Aerodrome	San Martín	07°59′08″N 073°34′37″W	
SQLJ		La Jaula Aerodrome	La Primavera	05°18′30″N 069°49′54″W	
SQLK		Luna Park Aerodrome	Santa Rosalía	05°07′41″N 070°29′35″W	
SQLL		El Nogal Aerodrome	Villavicencio	03°59′20″N 073°18′58″W	Closed
SQLM		La Macarena de San Pedro Aerodrome	San Pedro	03°58′50″N 076°14′57″W	Closed
SQLN		La Escondida Aerodrome	Puerto Gaitán	04°36′40″N 071°11′36″W	
SQLO		La Lorena Aerodrome	Paz de Ariporo	05°36′33″N 070°25′16″W	
SQLP		Hotel del Campo Aerodrome	Quimbaya, Quindío	04°36′44″N 075°48′48″W	
SQLQ		La Rinconada Aerodrome	San Martín	03°33′49″N 073°04′58″W	
SQLR		Las Flores Airport	Los Robles La Paz	10°05′47″N 073°14′01″W	
SQLS		La Ilusión Aerodrome	Maní	04°34′50″N 072°25′42″W	
SQLT		Leticia Aerodrome	Alvarado	04°27′37″N 075°01′56″W	
SQLU		Lucitania Aerodrome	Orocué	04°41′44″N 071°35′21″W	
SQLV		La Envidia Aerodrome	Maní	04°49′18″N 072°10′45″W	
SQLX		Los Laureles Aerodrome	Tauramena	04°21′48″N 072°24′55″W	
SQLY		La Ye Aerodrome	Ciénaga	11°00′14″N 074°12′48″W	
SQLZ		La Paz Aerodrome	Paratebueno	04°17′51″N 073°11′56″W	
SQMA		Proma Heliport	Bogotá	04°43′41″N 074°05′04″W	Closed
SQMB		Ana Maria Aerodrome	Agustín Codazzi	10°02′15″N 073°17′01″W	
SQMC		Madaci Aerodrome	Valledupar	10°19′39″N 073°22′19″W	Closed
SQMD		Alcaldia de Medellín Heliport	Medellín	06°14′42″N 075°34′26″W	
SQME		Mare Mare Aerodrome	Puerto Gaitán	04°38′40″N 071°38′43″W	
SQMF		Puerto Solano Aerodrome	Papunahua	01°54′26″N 070°45′44″W	
SQMG		Miramar de Guanapalo Aerodrome	San Luis de Palenque	05°03′15″N 071°00′04″W	
SQMH		Hyatt Bogotá Hotel Heliport	Bogotá	04°38′39″N 074°05′59″W	
SQMI		La Amalia Aerodrome	Zona Bananera	10°52′01″N 074°08′45″W	
SQMJ		Majagual Aerodrome	Fuente de Oro	03°23′29″N 073°41′50″W	
SQMK		Hacienda La Marqueza Heliport	Tenjo	04°49′37″N 074°08′29″W	
SQML		Macolla Aerodrome	Maní	04°46′17″N 072°04′18″W	
SQMM		La Maria de Cumaral Aerodrome	Cumaral	04°14′37″N 073°12′47″W	
SQMN		Las Malvinas Aerodrome	Puerto Gaitán	03°46′09″N 071°49′06″W	
SQMO		El Totumo Aerodrome 1	Paz de Ariporo	05°52′58″N 071°15′42″W	
SQMP		Maria Paz Aerodrome	La Primavera	05°12′13″N 069°47′14″W	
SQMQ		Campo Alegre de Trinidad Aerodrome	Trinidad	05°24′19″N 071°07′45″W	Closed
SQMR		La Marina Heliport	Santa Marta	11°14′37″N 074°13′05″W	
SQMS		El Monasterio Aerodrome	San Carlos de Guaroa	03°57′31″N 073°26′33″W	
SQMT		Duarte Medical Heliport	Cúcuta	07°53′57″N 072°29′05″W	
SQMU		Camarucos Aerodrome	Paz de Ariporo	05°52′31″N 070°39′30″W	
SQMV		Miravista Aerodrome	Trinidad	05°22′19″N 071°33′42″W	
SQMW		Medina Airport	Medina	04°29′03″N 073°20′42″W	
SQMX		Mexico Aerodrome	Trinidad	05°27′14″N 071°31′22″W	
SQMY		German Alberto Aerodrome	Yopal	05°11′09″N 072°19′12″W	
SQMZ		La Caimana Aerodrome	Paz de Ariporo	06°03′08″N 070°48′43″W	
SQNA		San Pablo de María La Baja Aerodrome	María La Baja	10°02′50″N 075°15′55″W	Closed
SQNB		San Bartel Heliport	Puerto Colombia	11°01′53″N 074°53′19″W	
SQNC		San Carlos Heliport	San Carlos	06°12′26″N 074°49′15″W	
SQND		Indira Aerodrome	Turbo	07°56′40″N 076°41′48″W	
SQNE		San Miguel de Pacoa Aerodrome	Pacoa	00°00′10″N 070°29′49″W	
SQNF		Beneficencia de Cundinamarca Heliport	Bogotá	04°38′19″N 074°05′48″W	Closed
SQNG		Los Mangos de Ayapel Aerodrome	Ayapel	08°18′01″N 075°06′16″W	
SQNH		El Conchal Aerodrome	El Cerrito	03°43′39″N 076°23′24″W	
SQNI		Armenia Aerodrome	Paz de Ariporo	05°45′56″N 070°11′31″W	
SQNJ		San Juanito Aerodrome	San Juanito	04°26′00″N 073°39′00″W	Coordinates unverified
SQNK		San Nicolas Aerodrome	Tauramena	04°28′13″N 072°27′27″W	Closed
SQNL		Las Cañas Aerodrome	Florida	03°18′23″N 076°20′08″W	
SQNM		La Colina Aerodrome	Villavicencio	04°03′52″N 073°23′02″W	
SQNN		Santa Ana de Piedras Aerodrome	Piedras	04°24′30″N 075°01′23″W	
SQNO		Libano Aerodrome	Bosconia	09°53′50″N 073°49′05″W	Closed
SQNP		Nueva York Milena Aerodrome	Villavicencio	04°05′25″N 073°14′03″W	
SQNQ		San Pedro de Urabá Aerodrome	San Pedro de Urabá	08°17′23″N 076°22′29″W	
SQNR		San Roque Aerodrome	San Pedro	04°00′14″N 076°13′15″W	Closed
SQNS		San Miguel de San Carlos de Guaroa Aerodrome	San Carlos de Guaroa	03°52′05″N 073°15′10″W	Closed
SQNT		Sabaneta de Puerto Gaitán Aerodrome	Puerto Gaitán	03°55′54″N 072°02′36″W	Closed
SQNU		San Vicente Aerodrome	Castilla la Nueva	03°48′40″N 073°26′14″W	
SQNV		RCN Television Building Heliport	Bogotá	04°37′56″N 074°07′04″W	
SQNW		Las Nubes Aerodrome	Puerto Gaitán	04°15′23″N 071°47′56″W	
SQNX		Cananari Aerodrome	Mitú	00°32′47″N 070°55′40″W	
SQNY		La Nena Cayta Aerodrome	Gamarra	08°12′10″N 073°42′03″W	Closed
SQNZ		El Silencio Aerodrome	Paz de Ariporo	05°45′06″N 071°39′40″W	
SQOA		Los Almendros Aerodrome	Carepa	07°47′29″N 076°39′07″W	
SQOB		COFA Buga Heliport	Buga	03°53′44″N 076°18′21″W	Closed
SQOC		El Paraíso de Nunchía Aerodrome	Nunchía	05°33′28″N 072°00′15″W	
SQOD		Sonaña Aerodrome	Pacoa	00°07′51″N 070°34′45″W	
SQOE		Potrerito Aerodrome	Ibagué	04°19′34″N 075°04′43″W	
SQOF		Lagos del Dorado Aerodrome	Miraflores	01°12′30″N 071°57′04″W	
SQOG		Campo Alegre de Huila Aerodrome	Campoalegre	02°39′47″N 075°20′24″W	
SQOH		Orihueca Aerodrome	Zona Bananera	10°49′29″N 074°09′45″W	
SQOI		El Paraíso de Ibagué Aerodrome	Ibagué	04°23′13″N 075°01′33″W	
SQOJ		Ultramojana Aerodrome	Caucasia	08°03′15″N 074°54′19″W	
SQOL		La Loma Aerodrome	San Martín	03°40′16″N 073°23′48″W	
SQOM		La Comarca Aerodrome	Trinidad	05°22′17″N 071°16′55″W	
SQON		La Ponderosa de Paratebueno Aerodrome	Paratebueno	04°17′16″N 073°08′01″W	
SQOO		Corocito Aerodrome	Puerto López	03°57′03″N 072°13′07″W	
SQOP		La Opia Aerodrome	Piedras	04°26′55″N 074°57′43″W	
SQOQ		La Cortes Aerodrome	Támesis	05°46′08″N 075°38′42″W	Closed
SQOR		Oreganal Aerodrome	Barrancas	10°58′46″N 072°44′22″W	Closed
SQOS		La Palma Aerodrome	Bosconia	09°52′01″N 073°51′26″W	
SQOT		Ocelote Aerodrome	Puerto Gaitán	04°16′30″N 071°36′45″W	
SQOU		Nuevo Mundo Aerodrome	Trinidad	05°31′55″N 071°49′26″W	Closed
SQOV		Boluga Aerodrome	Venadillo	04°41′21″N 074°53′25″W	
SQOW		El Panelón Aerodrome	La Primavera	05°20′48″N 069°13′21″W	
SQOX		Panorama Aerodrome	La Primavera	05°14′15″N 069°28′57″W	
SQOZ		Los Balticos Aerodrome	Puerto López	04°07′43″N 073°07′55″W	
SQPA		La Pastora Aerodrome	Arauca	06°47′09″N 070°57′33″W	
SQPB		Bavaria Central Park Heliport	Bogotá	04°37′13″N 074°04′24″W	Closed
SQPC		Piracuara Aerodrome	Taraira	00°40′13″S 069°39′05″W	Closed
SQPD		Pacu Aerodrome	Mitú	01°37′51″N 070°21′50″W	
SQPE		La Poreña Aerodrome	Pore	05°39′38″N 071°55′03″W	
SQPF		Las Palmas Aerodrome	La Gloria	08°33′35″N 073°41′05″W	
SQPG		El Prado Aerodrome	San Carlos de Guaroa	03°43′14″N 073°19′23″W	
SQPH		Palmarosa Aerodrome	Nunchía	05°33′58″N 072°04′01″W	
SQPI		Palmarito Aerodrome 2	Trinidad	05°19′52″N 071°14′08″W	
SQPJ		Pajonales Aerodrome	Ambalema	04°45′41″N 074°49′42″W	
SQPK		Pacoa Aerodrome	La Victoria	00°03′13″N 071°13′28″W	
SQPL		Entrerríos Municipal Palace Heliport	Entrerríos	06°35′29″N 075°34′35″W	Closed
SQPM		Mona Prieta Heliport	Cartagena	10°09′01″N 075°41′04″W	
SQPN		La Paulina Aerodrome	Los Robles La Paz	09°54′46″N 073°28′46″W	
SQPO		La Ponderosa de Sabana de Torres Aerodrome	Sabana de Torres	07°27′41″N 073°44′47″W	
SQPP		Banco Popular Heliport	Medellín	06°15′08″N 075°34′15″W	Closed
SQPQ		Pilmaiquen Aerodrome	Chigorodó	07°37′13″N 076°38′46″W	
SQPR		Pororo Aerodrome	Agustín Codazzi	09°56′05″N 073°16′06″W	
SQPS		Los Planes Aerodrome	Apartadó	07°50′02″N 076°38′43″W	
SQPT		Palmas de Tumaco Aerodrome	Tumaco	01°29′46″N 078°45′54″W	
SQPU		Acapulco Aerodrome	Nunchía	05°24′31″N 071°52′10″W	
SQPV		Piedra Ñi Aerodrome	Pacoa	00°06′32″S 070°19′38″W	
SQPW		Puerto Wilches Aerodrome	Puerto Wilches	07°20′53″N 073°53′34″W	Closed
SQPX		Puerto Perales Aerodrome	Puerto Triunfo	05°59′37″N 074°34′27″W	
SQPY		La Palestina de Pivijay Aerodrome	Pivijay	10°35′23″N 074°17′42″W	
SQPZ		La Esperanza de Agustín Codazzi Aerodrome	Agustín Codazzi	09°54′28″N 073°19′21″W	
SQQB		Quebraditas Aerodrome	Acacías	03°56′43″N 073°32′12″W	
SQQC		Santa Gracia Clinic Heliport	Popayán	02°27′36″N 076°36′11″W	
SQQE		Ruitoque Hotel Heliport	Piedecuesta	07°01′22″N 073°04′57″W	
SQQF		Barranquillita Aerodrome	Calamar	01°32′48″N 072°19′33″W	Closed
SQQJ		Los Quijotes Aerodrome	Orocué	04°48′52″N 071°38′49″W	
SQQK		Puerto Arica Aerodrome	Puerto Arica	02°08′45″S 071°45′27″W	
SQQL		Las Luchas Aerodrome	Maní	04°38′15″N 072°31′41″W	
SQQM		Mandala Aerodrome	Villavicencio	04°02′56″N 073°11′25″W	
SQQO		Maporal Aerodrome	San Luis de Palenque	05°10′39″N 071°57′54″W	
SQQP		Serena del Mar Hospital Centre Heliport	Cartagena	10°30′30″N 075°28′04″W	
SQQT		Mutatá Aerodrome	Mutatá	07°15′02″N 076°26′39″W	
SQQU		Tequendama Heliport	Aracataca	10°32′57″N 074°10′57″W	
SQQV		Buena Vista de Orocué Aerodrome	Orocué	04°50′39″N 071°30′29″W	
SQRA		La Arrobleda Aerodrome	Caloto	03°06′08″N 076°25′09″W	
SQRB		Petriba Aerodrome	Cabuyaro	04°21′42″N 072°49′39″W	
SQRD		El Rodeo de Puerto Gaitán Aerodrome	Puerto Gaitán	04°24′54″N 071°35′25″W	Closed
SQRE		Corcel Heliport	Barranca de Upía	04°23′15″N 072°55′40″W	
SQRF		La Maria de Purificación Aerodrome	Purificación	03°52′55″N 074°59′14″W	
SQRG		Maria Angelica Aerodrome	Aguazul	05°03′17″N 072°26′50″W	
SQRH		El Palmar Aerodrome	San Luis de Palenque	05°23′44″N 071°54′43″W	
SQRI		Rancho Colibri Aerodrome	Roldanillo	04°27′31″N 076°07′32″W	
SQRJ		Maria Juana Aerodrome	Aguazul	05°00′10″N 072°23′31″W	
SQRK		Nueva York Aerodrome	El Espinal	04°08′08″N 074°54′11″W	
SQRL		La Carolina Aerodrome	El Paso	09°31′41″N 073°47′12″W	
SQRM		Los Remansos Aerodrome	Cimitarra	06°34′22″N 074°13′10″W	
SQRN		El Tornillo Aerodrome	Rionegro	07°37′20″N 073°36′29″W	
SQRO		El Rodeo de Orocué Aerodrome	Orocué	04°45′15″N 071°55′54″W	
SQRP		Riopaila Aerodrome	Zarzal	04°19′02″N 076°05′39″W	
SQRQ		Arboletes Aerodrome	Arboletes	08°50′22″N 076°25′48″W	Closed
SQRR		Urra Aerodrome	Tierralta	08°00′19″N 076°13′39″W	Closed
SQRS		Base Principal Celta Aerodrome	Aguachica	08°12′01″N 073°37′52″W	
SQRT		Santa Clara de Villanueva Aerodrome	Villanueva	04°26′07″N 072°48′00″W	
SQRU		El Rincón de Mucura Aerodrome	San Onofre	09°46′27″N 075°38′18″W	Closed
SQRV		La Realidad Aerodrome	Villavicencio	03°59′42″N 073°22′39″W	
SQRW		El Rastro Aerodrome	Cumaribo	04°42′09″N 070°51′44″W	
SQRX		Renso Aerodrome	Trinidad	05°14′30″N 071°11′27″W	
SQRY		La Arabia Aerodrome	Cabuyaro	04°23′36″N 072°59′21″W	
SQRZ		La Reforma de Puerto López Aerodrome	Puerto López	04°03′45″N 073°08′54″W	Closed
SQSA		San Martín de Meta Aerodrome	San Martín	03°42′08″N 073°41′17″W	
SQSB		Santa Bárbara de Tesalia Aerodrome	Tesalia	02°27′16″N 075°44′03″W	
SQSC		Riosucio Aerodrome	Riosucio	07°24′59″N 077°03′34″W	
SQSD		Hotel San Diego Aerodrome	Puerto Gaitán	03°46′08″N 071°49′09″W	
SQSE		San Pedro de Buenavista Aerodrome	Buenavista	09°20′25″N 074°57′16″W	
SQSF		Los Sabanales Aerodrome	Fuente de Oro	03°22′13″N 073°27′51″W	
SQSG		San Miguel de Puerto López Aerodrome	Puerto López	04°06′26″N 072°53′38″W	
SQSH		La Sierrita Aerodrome	Chiriguaná	09°23′12″N 073°30′32″W	
SQSI		El Escobal Aerodrome	Ibagué	04°23′43″N 075°04′21″W	
SQSJ		San José de Lérida Aerodrome	Lérida	04°54′39″N 074°53′21″W	
SQSK		San Antonio Aerodrome	Mitú	00°40′47″N 070°26′15″W	
SQSL		Castillo Aerodrome	Manatí	10°24′34″N 075°00′27″W	
SQSM		San Martín de Bosconia Aerodrome	Bosconia	09°57′20″N 073°52′32″W	Closed
SQSN		San Pablo de Orocué Aerodrome	Orocué	04°47′09″N 071°37′51″W	
SQSO		ISA Floridablanca Heliport	Floridablanca	07°03′30″N 073°07′47″W	
SQSP		San Pablo de Cotorra Aerodrome	Cotorra	09°03′35″N 075°46′50″W	
SQSQ		Tres Esquinas Air Base	Solano	00°44′45″N 075°14′04″W	
SQSR		Palmas de Villanueva Aerodrome	Villanueva	04°36′07″N 072°49′47″W	
SQSS		Sirenas Aerodrome	Trinidad	05°15′15″N 071°09′27″W	
SQST		Iscuandé Aerodrome	Santa Bárbara	02°26′54″N 077°58′53″W	
SQSU		San Eduardo Aerodrome	Orocué	04°38′32″N 071°48′37″W	
SQSV		Las Vegas de Paz de Ariporo Aerodrome	Paz de Ariporo	06°00′33″N 071°17′54″W	
SQSW		Santa Lucia de Mitú Aerodrome	Mitú	01°22′57″N 070°00′24″W	
SQSX		Mesa de los Santos Heliport	Los Santos	06°47′29″N 073°03′04″W	
SQSY		El Espino Aerodrome	El Espino	06°29′18″N 072°30′18″W	
SQSZ		Los Venados de Puerto López Aerodrome	Puerto López	04°03′52″N 073°00′06″W	
SQTA		Banco de Bogotá Heliport	Bogotá	04°37′23″N 074°04′03″W	
SQTB		Tierra Blanca Aerodrome	Roldanillo	04°24′47″N 076°07′24″W	
SQTC		Tapa Aerodrome	Villavicencio	04°07′25″N 073°29′51″W	Closed
SQTD		San Diego Aerodrome	Tello	03°04′48″N 075°11′14″W	
SQTE		Banco de Occidente Heliport	Cali	03°27′04″N 076°32′08″W	
SQTF		Colfondos Tower Heliport	Bogotá	04°39′06″N 074°03′33″W	
SQTG		Mata de Agua Aerodrome	Paz de Ariporo	05°48′19″N 071°42′41″W	
SQTH		Tomachipan Aerodrome	San José del Guaviare	02°16′32″N 071°46′28″W	
SQTI		Santa Isabel de Villavicencio Aerodrome	Villavicencio	03°59′15″N 073°12′33″W	
SQTJ		El Tesoro Aerodrome	Trinidad	05°18′26″N 071°22′24″W	
SQTK		El Tapón Aerodrome	Cumaribo	05°09′00″N 069°11′00″W	Coordinates unverified
SQTL		Santa Isabel de Pacoa Aerodrome	Pacoa	00°07′04″S 070°11′35″W	
SQTM		Tamaca Aerodrome	Agustín Codazzi	09°54′51″N 073°13′42″W	Closed
SQTN		Mata de Plátano Aerodrome	Sabana de Torres	07°31′50″N 073°36′06″W	
SQTO		El Triunfo de Orocué Aerodrome	Orocué	04°48′33″N 071°40′07″W	
SQTP		Pacific Business Zone Heliport	Une	04°21′27″N 074°02′19″W	Closed
SQTQ		Talanqueras Aerodrome	Puerto López	04°08′28″N 073°01′55″W	
SQTR		Tres Rios Aerodrome	Calamar	01°12′23″N 072°43′57″W	Closed
SQTS		La Matua Aerodrome	San Diego	10°12′26″N 073°15′48″W	
SQTT		El Totumo Aerodrome	Paz de Ariporo	05°56′19″N 071°13′18″W	
SQTU		Cinera Aerodrome	Cúcuta	08°10′15″N 072°28′29″W	Closed
SQTV		Calicanto Aerodrome	Alvarado	04°29′20″N 075°00′36″W	
SQTW		Petrolea Aerodrome	Tibú	08°29′41″N 072°35′36″W	
SQTX		Las Tres Marias Aerodrome	Puerto López	04°12′47″N 072°36′27″W	Closed
SQTY		Tamarindo Aerodrome	Coyaima	03°47′25″N 075°04′52″W	Closed
SQTZ		Natalia Aerodrome	Puerto López	04°04′11″N 073°10′50″W	
SQUA		Santander Ophthalmology Foundation Heliport	Floridablanca	07°04′25″N 073°06′37″W	Closed
SQUB		Muriba Aerodrome	Maní	04°37′11″N 072°14′50″W	
SQUC		Banco de la República Pasto Heliport	Pasto	01°11′49″N 077°16′48″W	Closed
SQUE		El Recuerdo Aerodrome	Flandes	04°14′34″N 074°50′15″W	Closed
SQUF		La Luna Aerodrome	Fuente de Oro	03°26′31″N 073°34′08″W	
SQUG		Suescun Aerodrome	San Carlos de Guaroa	03°55′35″N 073°15′17″W	
SQUH		La Ceiba de Nunchía Aerodrome	Nunchía	05°26′53″N 072°00′25″W	
SQUI		Guarandingas Aerodrome	Trinidad	05°19′35″N 071°18′35″W	Closed
SQUJ		Tablón de Támara Aerodrome	Támara	05°43′33″N 072°06′02″W	
SQUM		Umbria Aerodrome	Cumaral	04°11′26″N 073°15′43″W	
SQUN		Señorias Aerodrome	Villanueva	04°23′16″N 072°46′14″W	
SQUO		El Guamo Aerodrome	Guamo	03°59′51″N 074°56′56″W	
SQUP		Minpro Aerodrome	Orocué	04°48′51″N 071°50′31″W	
SQUQ		Tucanes Aerodrome	Montenegro	04°28′32″N 075°50′27″W	
SQUR		Uraca Aerodrome	Puerto Colombia	11°00′22″N 074°55′21″W	Closed
SQUS		Savanna Aerodrome	Orocué	04°50′51″N 071°42′24″W	Closed
SQUT		Tiki Bar Heliport	Envigado	06°08′12″N 075°33′24″W	
SQUU		La Unión de Puerto Lleras Aerodrome	Puerto Lleras	03°19′54″N 073°17′42″W	Closed
SQUV		Canaima Aerodrome	Puerto López	04°06′55″N 073°15′49″W	
SQUY		El Ruby Aerodrome	Castilla la Nueva	03°46′53″N 073°29′02″W	
SQUZ		Los Acacios Aerodrome	Puerto López	04°11′53″N 072°26′47″W	
SQVA		Villanueva de la Guajira Aerodrome	Villanueva	10°35′00″N 073°01′00″W	Coordinates unverified
SQVB		Villa Veronica Aerodrome	Trinidad	05°23′16″N 071°35′07″W	
SQVC		La Salvación Aerodrome	Paz de Ariporo	05°59′56″N 070°37′54″W	
SQVD		Malvinas Aerodrome	Granada	03°25′15″N 073°45′55″W	
SQVE		Venecia Aerodrome	Calima	03°55′12″N 076°29′14″W	
SQVF		Nueva Fortuna Aerodrome	Necoclí	08°37′00″N 076°40′00″W	Coordinates unverified
SQVG		Venecia de Guanapalo Aerodrome	San Luis de Palenque	05°18′29″N 071°55′13″W	
SQVH		La Nevera Aerodrome	Nunchía	05°30′44″N 072°07′46″W	
SQVI		Villa Oliva Aerodrome	San Martín	07°57′34″N 073°35′53″W	
SQVJ		Nueva Granada Aerodrome	La Jagua de Ibirico	09°34′44″N 073°22′23″W	Closed
SQVK		La Victoria de Cumaribo Aerodrome	Cumaribo	03°49′41″N 070°35′21″W	
SQVL		Sevilla Aerodrome	Hato Corozal	05°55′24″N 071°42′50″W	
SQVM		Military Housing Fund Heliport I	Bogotá	04°38′47″N 074°05′51″W	Closed
SQVN		La Provincia Aerodrome	Paz de Ariporo	05°41′30″N 070°06′36″W	
SQVO		La Elvira Aerodrome	Obando	04°36′58″N 075°57′59″W	
SQVP		Caño Colorado de Mitú Aerodrome	Mitú	00°21′08″N 070°26′37″W	
SQVQ		Las Gaviotas de la Tebaida Aerodrome	La Tebaida	04°25′41″N 075°47′49″W	
SQVR		La Veremos Aerodrome	San Luis de Palenque	05°20′20″N 071°36′01″W	
SQVS		Villa Isabella Aerodrome	Trinidad	05°17′57″N 071°20′36″W	
SQVT		La Venturosa de San Luis de Palenque Aerodrome	San Luis de Palenque	05°14′20″N 071°18′13″W	
SQVU		El Vigia Aerodrome	Villanueva	04°33′22″N 072°55′07″W	
SQVV		Varsovia de Paz de Ariporo Aerodrome	Paz de Ariporo	05°50′56″N 070°21′53″W	
SQVX		La Vetilla Aerodrome	Amalfi	07°09′48″N 074°55′39″W	Closed
SQVY		El Vergel Aerodrome	Cabuyaro	04°12′23″N 073°00′09″W	
SQVZ		La Victoria de Los Robles La Paz Aerodrome	Los Robles La Paz	10°03′44″N 073°15′30″W	
SQWA		Waterloo Aerodrome	Piedras	04°26′31″N 075°02′09″W	
SQWB		Los Lobitos Aerodrome	Tauramena	04°33′16″N 072°37′34″W	
SQWC		Cucura Aerodrome	La Primavera	05°11′28″N 070°02′28″W	Closed
SQWE		La Bendición de Manare Aerodrome	Yopal	05°03′13″N 072°04′01″W	
SQWH		Hato Grande Aerodrome	Puerto López	04°12′38″N 072°29′14″W	
SQWI		Medellín Intercontinental Hotel Heliport	Medellín	06°12′49″N 075°33′31″W	
SQWL		Los Arucos Aerodrome	Maní	04°56′36″N 072°13′42″W	
SQWM		Vallemar Aerodrome	San Luis de Palenque	05°08′14″N 071°04′12″W	
SQWN		Mundo Nuevo Aerodrome	Puerto López	04°20′02″N 072°18′55″W	
SQWO		Montecielo Heliport I	El Peñol	06°12′15″N 075°14′27″W	Closed
SQWP		Carupana Aerodrome	Trinidad	05°31′57″N 071°45′07″W	
SQWR		Rosendas Aerodrome	Cumaribo	04°46′30″N 070°46′55″W	
SQWS		La Milagrosa Aerodrome	Paz de Ariporo	05°29′00″N 071°18′50″W	Closed
SQWT		World Trade Centre Heliport	Bogotá	04°40′51″N 074°02′28″W	
SQWU		Helitours Guatapé Heliport	Guatapé	06°13′27″N 075°10′49″W	
SQWW		Managua Aerodrome	Yopal	04°54′23″N 071°58′54″W	
SQXB		Barbascal Aerodrome	San Martín	03°38′54″N 073°15′21″W	
SQXL		Liveney Aerodrome	Puerto Gaitán	04°26′32″N 071°34′19″W	
SQXM		Santa Marta Aerodrome	Orocué	04°59′31″N 071°11′19″W	
SQXO		El Santísimo Heliport	Floridablanca	07°04′54″N 073°04′09″W	
SQXP		San Pedro de Trinidad Aerodrome	Trinidad	05°30′12″N 071°40′15″W	
SQXR		Los Ripios Aerodrome	San Luis de Palenque	05°14′32″N 071°24′54″W	
SQXS		El Remanso Aerodrome	Pore	05°41′51″N 071°52′44″W	
SQXT		La Tormenta Aerodrome	Paz de Ariporo	05°50′31″N 071°31′26″W	
SQXU		Elemento Heliport	Bogotá	04°39′34″N 074°06′21″W	
SQYA		Villa Gladys Aerodrome	Pacoa	00°15′38″N 071°21′24″W	
SQYB		Monterrey de Zambrano Aerodrome	Zambrano	09°44′14″N 074°49′45″W	
SQYC		Trompillos Aerodrome	Yopal	05°05′35″N 072°10′50″W	
SQYF		Mata de Indio Aerodrome	El Paso	09°45′35″N 073°39′24″W	
SQYI		Military Housing Fund Heliport II	Bogotá	04°38′47″N 074°05′00″W	Closed
SQYL		Yalconia Aerodrome	Cabuyaro	04°20′06″N 073°02′45″W	
SQYM		Yurumi Aerodrome	Puerto López	04°08′11″N 072°32′55″W	
SQYO		El Tesorito Aerodrome	Orocué	04°49′08″N 071°45′09″W	Closed
SQYP		Yapima Aerodrome	Yavaraté	01°04′35″N 069°29′04″W	
SQYS		Los Reyes Aerodrome	Pereira	04°47′57″N 075°49′45″W	Closed
SQYT		Mirití-Paraná Aerodrome	Mirití-Paraná	00°53′08″S 070°59′02″W	
SQYV		Yavaraté Aerodrome	Yavaraté	00°36′42″N 069°12′26″W	
SQZB		La Bengala Aerodrome	Villanueva	04°26′08″N 072°45′07″W	Closed
SQZD		Pisadromo Aerodrome	Cumaribo	04°47′06″N 069°48′17″W	
SQZE		La Esperancita Aerodrome	Puerto Gaitán	04°20′10″N 072°00′43″W	
SQZF		Fosunab Foundation Heliport	Floridablanca	07°04′14″N 073°06′48″W	
SQZH		Sotavento Aerodrome	El Cerrito	03°41′15″N 076°18′02″W	
SQZJ		Pizarro Aerodrome	Bajo Baudó	04°57′52″N 077°22′00″W	
SQZM		Remolinos Aerodrome	Puerto López	04°12′19″N 072°39′50″W	
SQZN		El Encanto de Amazonas Aerodrome	El Encanto	01°45′10″S 073°12′19″W	
SQZO		El Lagunazo Aerodrome	La Primavera	05°39′20″N 070°03′09″W	Closed
SQZP		Zapatoca Aerodrome	Zapatoca	06°46′03″N 073°17′05″W	
SQZQ		La Piedra Heliport	Guatapé	06°13′28″N 075°10′49″W	
SQZR		El Caribe Aerodrome	Paz de Ariporo	05°43′11″N 071°29′47″W	
SQZS		Zamar Aerodrome	Paz de Ariporo	05°45′09″N 071°35′13″W	
SQZV		Campo Venecia Aerodrome	Calima	03°55′12″N 076°29′14″W	Closed
SQZW		Montecielo Heliport II	El Peñol	06°12′59″N 075°14′04″W	Closed
SQZX		Entremares Heliport	Cartagena	10°09′29″N 075°39′12″W	Closed
