= SQE =

SQE may refer to:

- San Luis de Palenque Airport, Colombia, IATA airport code
- Solicitors Qualifying Examination, the equivalent of the bar examination for solicitors in England and Wales
- Surrey Quays railway station, London, National Rail station code
