= Copey =

Copey may refer to:

- El Copey, a town and municipality in the Colombian Department of Cesar
- the Danish krone in finance professional slang
- Clusia rosea, a tree species
