= San Luis de Palenque =

Coordinates: 5°25′N 71°44′W

- Municipality and town
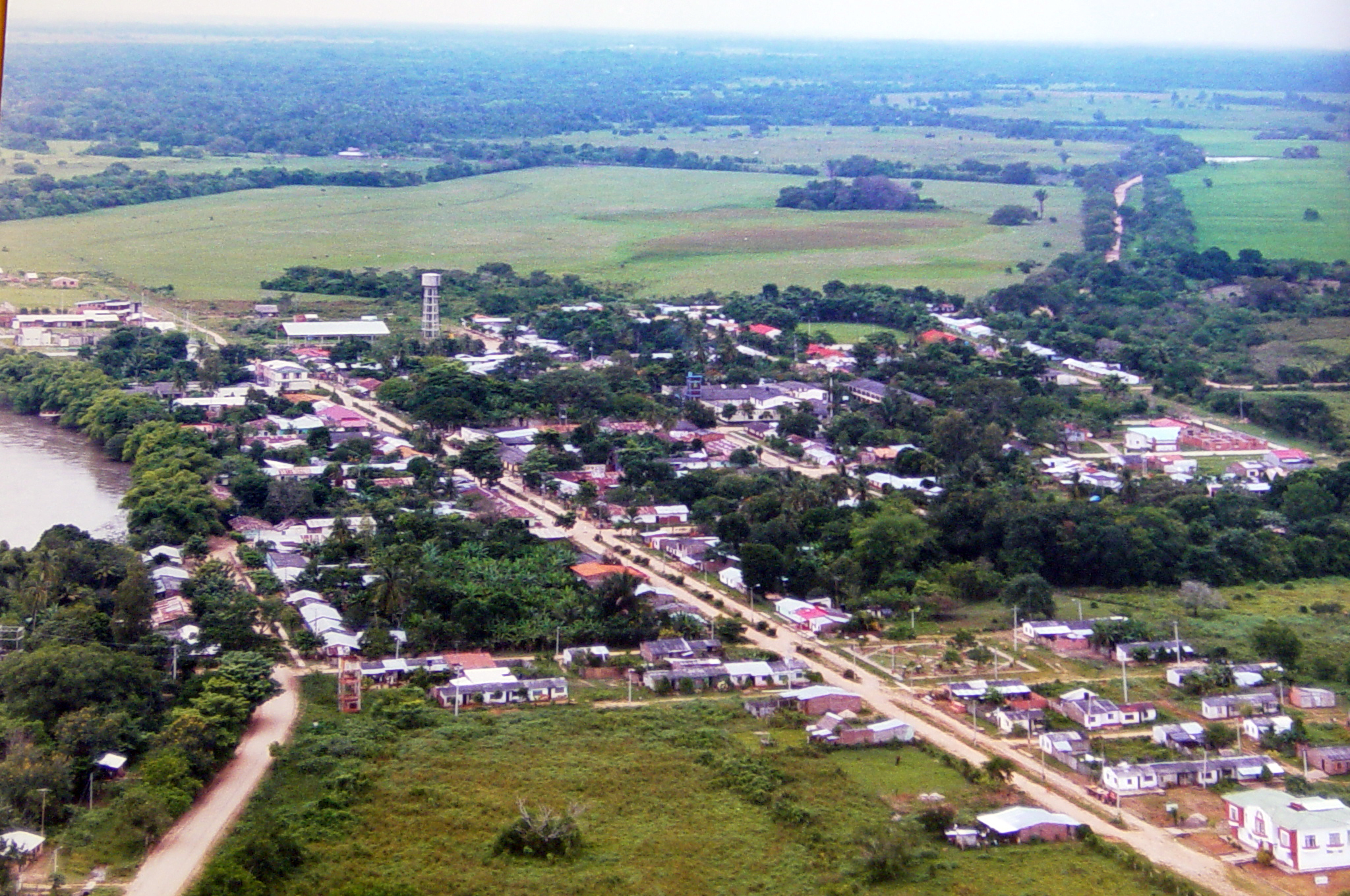
- View of San_Luis_de_Palenque_01082.JPG

- Flag

- Location of the municipality and town of San Luis de Palenque in the Casanare Department of Colombia.
- Country: Colombia
- Department: Casanare Department
- Elevation: 170 m (550 ft)
- Time zone: UTC-5 (Colombia Standard Time)

San Luis de Palenque is a town and municipality in the Department of Casanare, Colombia. The town is on a bend of the Pauto River, a tributary of the Meta River.

It is served by San Luis de Palenque Airport.
