= La Salina, Casanare =

Coordinates: 6.13056°N 72.3378°W

La Salina
- Municipality and town
- Flag

- Location of the municipality and town of La Salina in the Casanare Department of Colombia.
- Country: Colombia
- Region: Andean Region
- Department: Casanare Department
- Time zone: UTC-5 (Colombia Standard Time)

La Salina is a town and municipality in the Department of Casanare, Colombia.
