= Trinidad, Casanare =

Coordinates: 5.40889°N 71.6622°W

- Municipality and town
- Flag Coat of arms

- Location of the municipality and town of Trinidad, Casanare in the Casanare Department of Colombia.
- Country: Colombia
- Department: Casanare Department

Area
  - Total: 2,991 km^{2} (1,155 sq mi)

Population (Census 2018)
  - Total: 11,734
  - Density: 3.923/km^{2} (10.16/sq mi)
- Time zone: UTC-5 (Colombia Standard Time)

Trinidad (Spanish pronunciation: [tɾiniˈðað]) is a town and municipality in the Department of Casanare, Colombia.

In pre-Columbian times, the region was inhabited by the Achaguas, Guahibos and Chiricoas Indians, who were warrior and polygamous nomads, mainly engaged in deer hunting. Between 1720 and 1736, the Jesuit missionary Juan Rivero toured the region evangelizing the natives. On 12 February 1724 the town of Trinidad was founded by a group of indigenous Chiricoas, led by cacique Chacuamare, on the banks of the Meta River, on Rivero's recommendation. Subsequently, the town moved to the banks of the Pauto River. From Trinidad, the legendary llanero, true hero of the Vargas Swamp, is known from Trinidad, who contributed under his ideas to defeat the royalists in Boyacá.
