= Sácama =

Coordinates: 6°06′N 72°15′W

Sacama
- Municipality and town
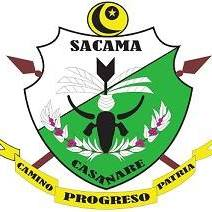
- Flag Coat of arms

- Location of the municipality and town of Sacama in the Casanare Department of Colombia.
- Country: Colombia
- Department: Casanare Department
- Time zone: UTC-5 (Colombia Standard Time)

Sácama (Spanish pronunciation: [ˈsakama]) is a town and municipality in the Department of Casanare, Colombia.

== Climate ==
Sacama has a very wet tropical rainforest climate (Köppen Af), although it borders very closely on the tropical monsoon climate (Am) found further east.

Climate data for Sacama
Month	Jan	Feb	Mar	Apr	May	Jun	Jul	Aug	Sep	Oct	Nov	Dec	Year
Mean daily maximum °C (°F)	28.1 (82.6)	28.6 (83.5)	28.5 (83.3)	27.2 (81.0)	26.6 (79.9)	25.8 (78.4)	26.0 (78.8)	26.3 (79.3)	26.7 (80.1)	26.6 (79.9)	26.9 (80.4)	27.4 (81.3)	27.1 (80.7)
Daily mean °C (°F)	22.0 (71.6)	22.4 (72.3)	22.7 (72.9)	22.0 (71.6)	21.6 (70.9)	21.1 (70.0)	21.0 (69.8)	21.2 (70.2)	21.3 (70.3)	21.4 (70.5)	21.6 (70.9)	21.8 (71.2)	21.7 (71.0)
Mean daily minimum °C (°F)	16.0 (60.8)	16.3 (61.3)	17.0 (62.6)	16.9 (62.4)	16.7 (62.1)	16.4 (61.5)	16.1 (61.0)	16.1 (61.0)	16.0 (60.8)	16.2 (61.2)	16.4 (61.5)	16.2 (61.2)	16.4 (61.5)
Average rainfall mm (inches)	64.5 (2.54)	81.9 (3.22)	149.4 (5.88)	317.9 (12.52)	510.4 (20.09)	463.4 (18.24)	475.8 (18.73)	394.8 (15.54)	346.9 (13.66)	431.3 (16.98)	260.8 (10.27)	90.0 (3.54)	3,587.1 (141.21)
Average rainy days	6	7	11	18	23	23	23	22	19	21	16	7	196
Source 1:
Source 2:
