= Aguazul =

Coordinates: 5.17306°N 72.5547°W

- Municipality and town
- Flag Coat of arms

- Location of the municipality and town of Aguazul in the Casanare Department of Colombia
- Country: Colombia
- Region: Orinoquía Region
- Department: Casanare Department

Population (2020 est.)
  - Total: 44,381
- Time zone: UTC-5 (Colombia Standard Time)

Aguazul (Spanish pronunciation: [aɣwaˈsul]) is a town and municipality in the Department of Casanare, Colombia. Its economy is dependent on oil, mainly Cupiagua and Cusiana fields. Other important products of its economy are livestock and rice. As of 2004, Leonel Torres has been mayor of the city.

== History ==
=== "La Violencia" ===
During the time known as La Violencia, or "The Violence", Aguazul, as well as most of Casanare, was controlled by liberal guerrillas. The region was a political and military zone of influence, even being declared independent by the promulgation of the Vega Perdida Constitution.

In those times, Aguazul was known as Sevilla and was an important trade center and one of the few passage ways for livestock for the inner meat market.

The city was destroyed by the Colombian Air Force bombardments and was rebuilt in the same location but across the river.

=== Armed conflict ===
Traditionally the zone was controlled by the leftist Ejército de Liberación Nacional. During the 1995-1998 time period, it was subject to intense combat and a scenario of continuing murder perpetrated by paramilitary groups, which succeeded in gaining control of the area.

The presence of the paramilitary group Autodefensas Campesinas de Casanare, whose base of operations was in the nearby municipalities of Villanueva and Monterrey, was a constant until 2004 when the group surrendered the zone to the Autodefensas Unidas de Colombia AUC, in a battle which is said to have cost more than 3.000 lives.

== Climate ==
Aguazul has a tropical monsoon climate (Am) with moderate to little rainfall from December to March and heavy to very heavy rainfall from April to November.

Climate data for Aguazul, elevation 380 m (1,250 ft), (1981–2010)
Month	Jan	Feb	Mar	Apr	May	Jun	Jul	Aug	Sep	Oct	Nov	Dec	Year
Mean daily maximum °C (°F)	33.1 (91.6)	33.6 (92.5)	33.4 (92.1)	32.2 (90.0)	30.7 (87.3)	29.8 (85.6)	29.8 (85.6)	30.6 (87.1)	31.2 (88.2)	31.3 (88.3)	31.3 (88.3)	31.9 (89.4)	31.5 (88.7)
Daily mean °C (°F)	27.9 (82.2)	28.1 (82.6)	28.0 (82.4)	26.8 (80.2)	26.1 (79.0)	25.6 (78.1)	25.4 (77.7)	25.7 (78.3)	26.2 (79.2)	26.4 (79.5)	26.8 (80.2)	27.2 (81.0)	26.7 (80.1)
Mean daily minimum °C (°F)	21.1 (70.0)	22.2 (72.0)	22.4 (72.3)	22.3 (72.1)	21.8 (71.2)	21.0 (69.8)	21.4 (70.5)	21.4 (70.5)	21.4 (70.5)	21.6 (70.9)	21.4 (70.5)	21.1 (70.0)	21.6 (70.9)
Average precipitation mm (inches)	12.6 (0.50)	62.7 (2.47)	102.1 (4.02)	279.0 (10.98)	414.2 (16.31)	414.3 (16.31)	365.7 (14.40)	317.2 (12.49)	315.5 (12.42)	274.7 (10.81)	144.1 (5.67)	36.8 (1.45)	2,738.9 (107.83)
Average precipitation days	2	5	8	16	20	21	20	19	16	16	11	3	146
Average relative humidity (%)	68	68	71	78	83	84	83	81	81	81	79	73	78
Mean monthly sunshine hours	229.4	183.5	148.8	126.0	139.5	117.0	136.4	151.9	174.0	176.7	180.0	213.9	1,977.1
Mean daily sunshine hours	7.4	6.5	4.8	4.2	4.5	3.9	4.4	4.9	5.8	5.7	6.0	6.9	5.4
Source: Instituto de Hidrologia Meteorologia y Estudios Ambientales

== Born in Aguazul ==
- Frank Ramírez, Colombian actor
