= Nunchía =

Coordinates: 5°38′N 72°12′W

- Municipality and town
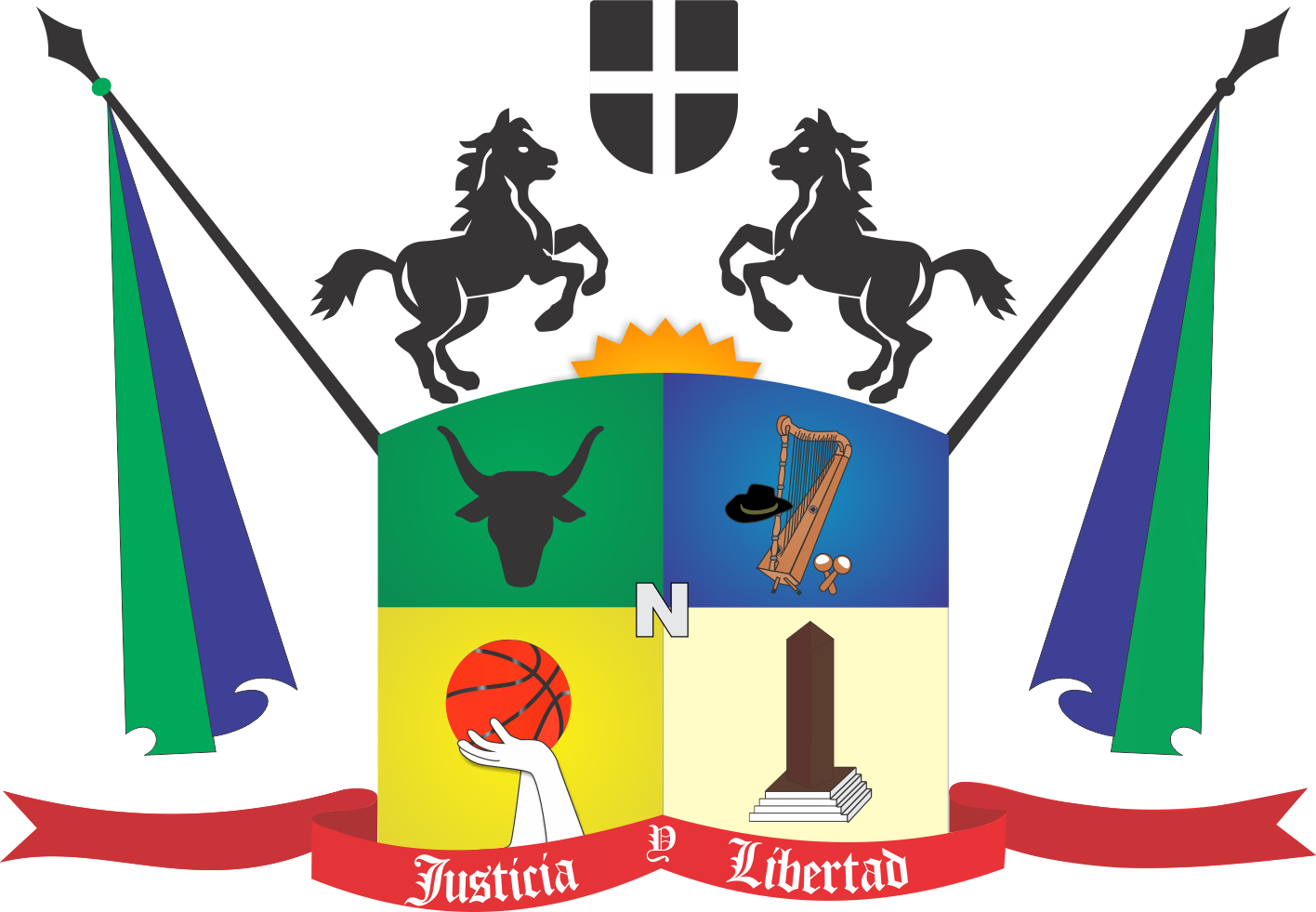
- Flag Coat of arms

- Location of the municipality and town of Nunchía in the Casanare Department of Colombia
- Country: Colombia
- Region: Orinoquía Region
- Department: Casanare Department
- Time zone: UTC-5 (Colombia Standard Time)

Nunchía is a town and municipality in the Department of Casanare, Colombia. Its economy is primarily based on agriculture and livestock farming, with the four main rivers Tocaría, Payero, Nunchía, and Pauto affecting the agricultural landscape. Extensive cattle ranching is the dominant economic activity with significant crops including rice, oil palm, coffee, and cocoa beans. Poultry, pig farming, and fish farming are also present but on a smaller scale.

== Demographics ==
As of the 2018 Colombian census, the municipality of Nunchía had a total population of 8,826, with a modest population density of 8.01 inhabitants per square kilometer, spread across an area of 1,102 km^{2}. The municipality has experienced a gradual population increase, with an annual growth rate of 0.36% from 2005 to 2018.

The town of Nunchía, which is the municipal capital, had a population of 1,904 in 2018. It has a relatively high population density of 2,037 people per square kilometer, with 51.7% of the population being male (984 individuals) and 48.3% female (920 individuals). The town is one of the two main urban centers in the municipality, the other being La Yopalosa, which had a population of 474 in 2018.

In terms of age structure, the population of Nunchía the capital was predominantly composed of working-age individuals. Of the total population in the urban area, 67.1% (1,200 people) were between 15 and 64 years old, which is a key demographic for economic activities. Children aged 0-14 years made up 25.2% of the population (451 people), while 7.7% (138 people) were aged 65 years or older.

== Economy ==
Nunchía's economy is primarily based on agriculture and livestock farming, with the latter accounting for 60% of land use. The municipality is surrounded by four main rivers: Tocaría, Payero, Nunchía, and Pauto, which influence its agricultural landscape. While extensive cattle ranching is the dominant economic activity with approximately 65,000 head of cattle, significant crops include rice (12,524 hectares), oil palm (753 hectares), coffee (371 hectares), and cocoa beans (39 hectares). Poultry, pig farming, and fish farming are also present but on a smaller, empirical scale lacking proper controls and technification.

Rice is the main seasonal crop, with an average of 19,218 hectares cultivated between 2011 and 2014, yielding around 4.8 tons per hectare. However, climate change is projected to reduce rice productivity in the region. Other seasonal crops like corn show low production levels and declining prices. For permanent and semi-permanent crops, Nunchía cultivates plantains, cassava, pineapples, and honey cane, primarily for self-consumption. Coffee and cocoa beans are cultivated in mountainous areas, with average annual plantings of 350 hectares for coffee and around 40 hectares for cocoa. While these crops have lower yields, their market prices have strengthened since 2013.

== Notable residents ==
- Salvador Camacho, former president of Colombia
