= San Luis de Palenque Airport =

- IATA: SQE; ICAO: SKNP; LID: SK-120

Summary
- Airport type: Public
- Serves: San Luis de Palenque
- Elevation AMSL: 551 ft (168 m)
- Coordinates: 5°24′50″N 71°43′43″W

Map
- Location of the airport in Colombia

Runways
Direction	Length		Surface
Direction	m	ft	Surface
04/22	1,075	3,527	Grass
- Sources: GCM Google Maps

San Luis de Palenque Airport (IATA: SQE, ICAO: SKNP) is an airport serving the town of San Luis de Palenque, in Casanare Department of Colombia. The runway is southeast, adjacent to the town.

== See also ==
- Transport in Colombia
- List of airports in Colombia
