= Puerto López, Meta =

- Municipality and town
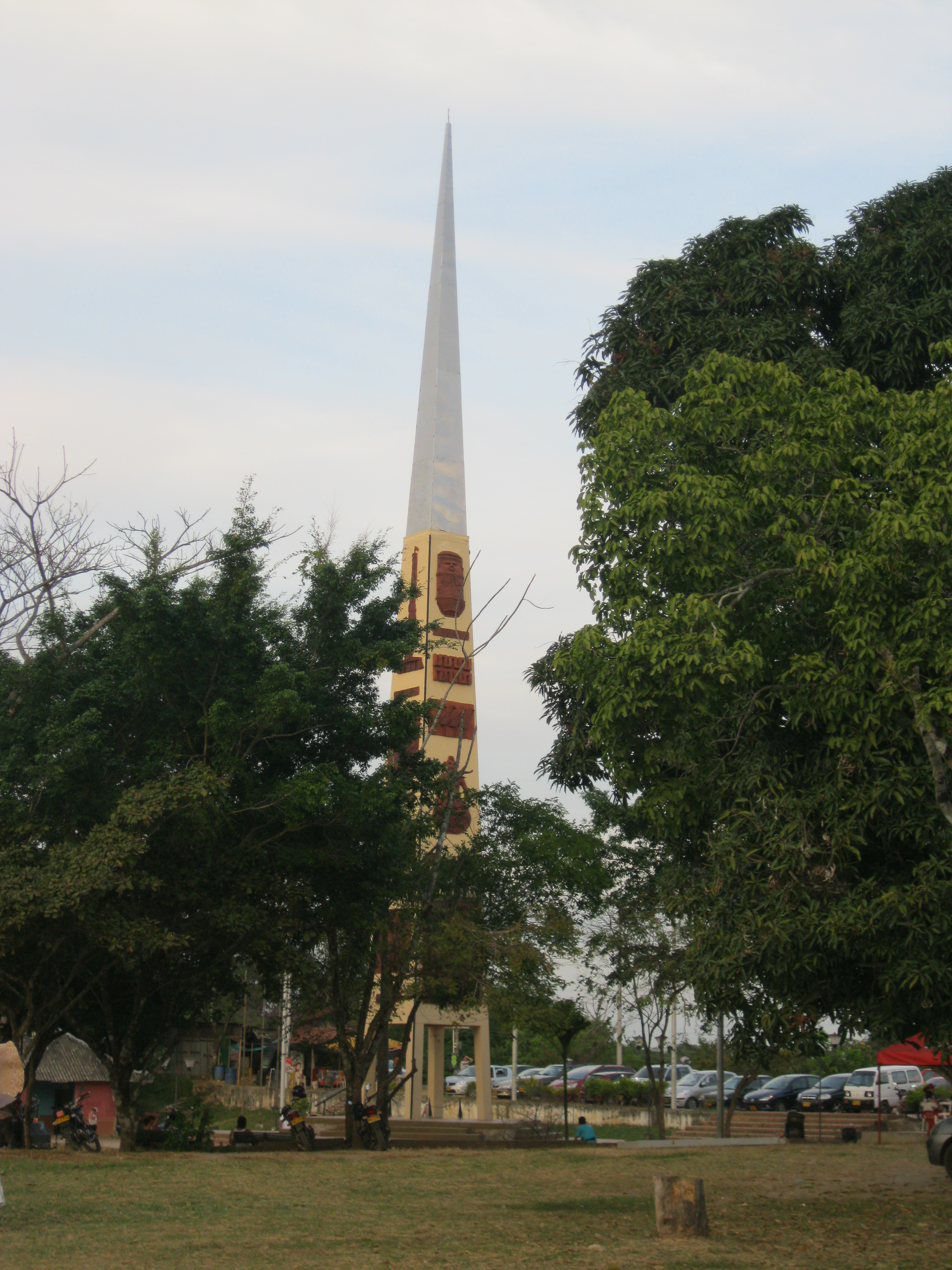

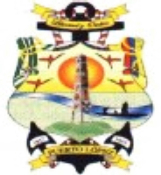
- Flag Coat of arms

- Location of the municipality and town of Puerto López, Meta in the Meta Department of Colombia.
- Coordinates: 4°05′14″N 72°57′38″W
- Country: Colombia
- Department: Meta Department
- Founded: May 1, 1935

Government
  - Mayor: Victor Manuel Bravo Rodriguez

Area
  - Total: 6,740 km^{2} (2,600 sq mi)
- Elevation: 365 m (1,198 ft)

Population (2015)
  - Total: 33,440
- Time zone: UTC-5 (Colombia Standard Time)
- Climate: Am

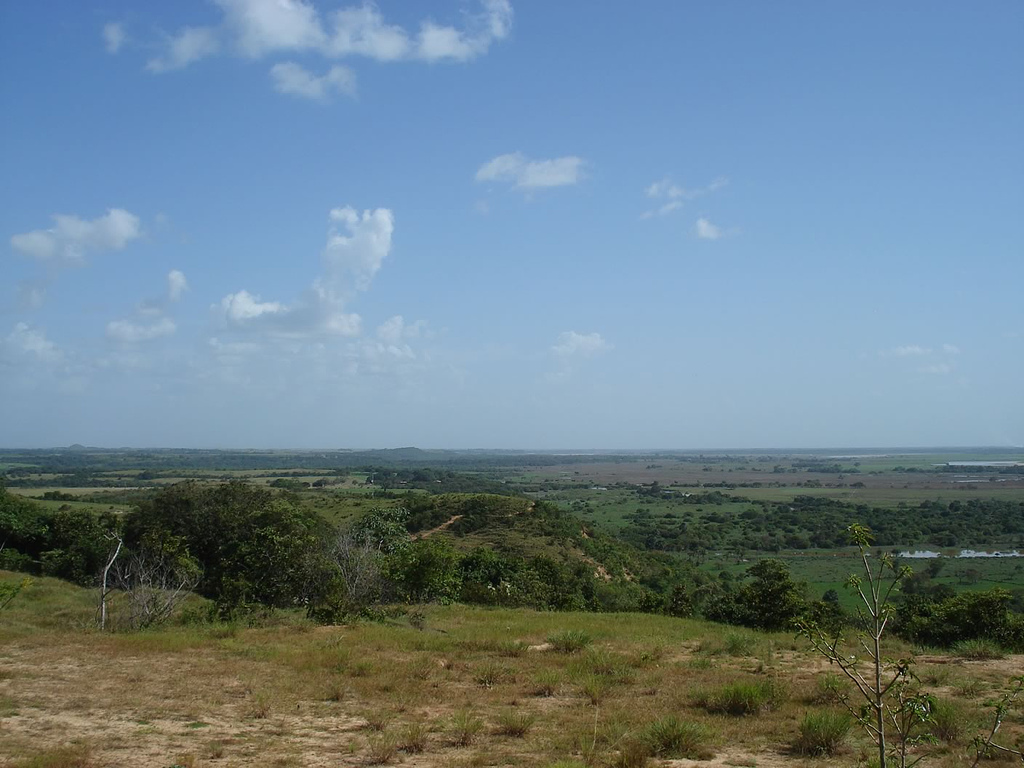
The Llanos plains in the outskirts of Puerto Lopez

Puerto Alfonso López (Spanish pronunciation: [ˈpweɾto ˈlopes]) is a small town and municipality in the Orinoquía Region (Llanos region) of Meta Department, Colombia. It is known as Puerto López and is a port on the Meta river. The town is located approximately 100 kilometers east of the town of Villavicencio. Its main industries are agriculture and cattle.

Puerto Lopez has been said to be the "belly button", or geographical center, of Colombia. Nearby is the Obelisco del Alto de Menegua, a 30-meter-tall obelisk that marks the intersection of 4 degrees north latitude and 72 degrees west longitude.

== History ==
The town was established on 1 May 1935. It was centered on the river port and pre-existing village. On 3 May 1937, the Intendencia for Meta Department ordered the creation of the Yacuana District (corregimiento) whose capital is Puerto Alfonso Lopez. The municipality was established on 3 July 1955, in accordance with National Decree No. 2543 of 1945.

== Climate ==
Climate data for Puerto López (Margaritas Las Hda), elevation 150 m (490 ft), (1981–2010)
Month	Jan	Feb	Mar	Apr	May	Jun	Jul	Aug	Sep	Oct	Nov	Dec	Year
Mean daily maximum °C (°F)	34.3 (93.7)	34.8 (94.6)	34.4 (93.9)	32.5 (90.5)	31.2 (88.2)	30.1 (86.2)	30.2 (86.4)	30.8 (87.4)	31.8 (89.2)	32.0 (89.6)	32.1 (89.8)	32.8 (91.0)	32.2 (90.0)
Daily mean °C (°F)	27.8 (82.0)	28.0 (82.4)	27.9 (82.2)	26.9 (80.4)	26.3 (79.3)	25.5 (77.9)	25.4 (77.7)	25.7 (78.3)	26.3 (79.3)	26.5 (79.7)	26.6 (79.9)	26.9 (80.4)	26.6 (79.9)
Mean daily minimum °C (°F)	21.7 (71.1)	22.1 (71.8)	22.2 (72.0)	22.6 (72.7)	22.2 (72.0)	22.0 (71.6)	21.8 (71.2)	22.0 (71.6)	22.2 (72.0)	22.4 (72.3)	22.5 (72.5)	21.9 (71.4)	22.1 (71.8)
Average precipitation mm (inches)	13.8 (0.54)	37.9 (1.49)	92.4 (3.64)	230.8 (9.09)	313.9 (12.36)	330.4 (13.01)	291.9 (11.49)	257.2 (10.13)	230.2 (9.06)	232.7 (9.16)	140.7 (5.54)	25.6 (1.01)	2,197.7 (86.52)
Average precipitation days	2	4	8	14	19	20	18	17	14	13	10	3	136
Average relative humidity (%)	72	71	72	78	82	85	86	85	83	82	82	78	80
Mean monthly sunshine hours	226.3	200.4	164.3	132.0	130.2	138.0	133.3	142.6	165.0	176.7	177.0	213.9	1,999.7
Mean daily sunshine hours	7.3	7.1	5.3	4.4	4.2	4.6	4.3	4.6	5.5	5.7	5.9	6.9	5.5
Source: Instituto de Hidrologia Meteorologia y Estudios Ambientales
