= Papunaua =

Coordinates: 1°56′31″N 70°32′28″W

Papunahua
- Corregimiento and village
- Location of the town and Department Corregimiento of Papunahua in the Vaupés Department of Colombia.
- Country: Colombia
- Department: Vaupés Department

Population (2015)
  - Total: 879
- Time zone: UTC-5 (Colombia Standard Time)

Papunahua (Spanish pronunciation: [papuˈnawa]) is a village and Department Corregimiento located in the Vaupés Department, Republic of Colombia.
