= Fuente de Oro =

Coordinates: 3°28′N 73°37′W

- Municipality and town
- Flag

- Location of the municipality and town of Fuente de Oro in the Meta Department of Colombia.
- Country: Colombia
- Department: Meta Department

Area
  - Total: 576 km^{2} (222 sq mi)
- Elevation: 359 m (1,178 ft)

Population (Census 2018)
  - Total: 11,599
  - Density: 20.1/km^{2} (52.2/sq mi)
- Time zone: UTC-5 (Colombia Standard Time)
- Climate: Am

Fuente de Oro (English: Fountain of Gold) is a town and municipality in the Meta Department, Colombia.

== Climate ==
Climate data for Fuente de Oro (Cooperativa La), elevation 280 m (920 ft), (1981–2010)
Month	Jan	Feb	Mar	Apr	May	Jun	Jul	Aug	Sep	Oct	Nov	Dec	Year
Mean daily maximum °C (°F)	32.0 (89.6)	32.2 (90.0)	31.7 (89.1)	30.7 (87.3)	30.3 (86.5)	29.8 (85.6)	29.7 (85.5)	30.5 (86.9)	31.1 (88.0)	31.2 (88.2)	31.0 (87.8)	31.2 (88.2)	30.9 (87.6)
Daily mean °C (°F)	25.8 (78.4)	25.9 (78.6)	25.8 (78.4)	25.4 (77.7)	25.2 (77.4)	24.7 (76.5)	24.6 (76.3)	24.8 (76.6)	25.3 (77.5)	25.4 (77.7)	25.5 (77.9)	25.7 (78.3)	25.4 (77.7)
Mean daily minimum °C (°F)	20.4 (68.7)	20.5 (68.9)	20.5 (68.9)	20.6 (69.1)	20.6 (69.1)	20.4 (68.7)	20.3 (68.5)	20.3 (68.5)	20.7 (69.3)	20.8 (69.4)	20.9 (69.6)	20.7 (69.3)	20.6 (69.1)
Average precipitation mm (inches)	29.1 (1.15)	83.8 (3.30)	150.6 (5.93)	277.0 (10.91)	372.1 (14.65)	319.3 (12.57)	255.7 (10.07)	191.6 (7.54)	191.7 (7.55)	223.3 (8.79)	180.2 (7.09)	69.7 (2.74)	2,344.2 (92.29)
Average precipitation days	3	6	11	17	20	20	19	16	14	13	12	6	156
Average relative humidity (%)	81	81	83	84	85	86	86	85	84	83	84	82	84
Source: Instituto de Hidrologia Meteorologia y Estudios Ambientales
