= Pacoa =

Coordinates: 0°1′17″N 71°0′20″W

- Corregimiento and town
- Location of the corregimiento and town of Pacoa in the Vaupés Department of Colombia.
- Country: Colombia
- Department: Vaupés Department
- Time zone: UTC-5 (Colombia Standard Time)

Pacoa is a Department Corregimiento located in the Vaupés Department, Republic of Colombia its head town is the town of Buenos Aires. After spending almost 9 years kidnapped by the Revolutionary Armed Forces of Colombia (FARC) Police sub-intendant Jhon Frank Pinchao escaped in the territory of Pacoa.
