= Casanare Department =

National subdivision in Colombia

Department of Casanare Departamento de Casanare
- Department
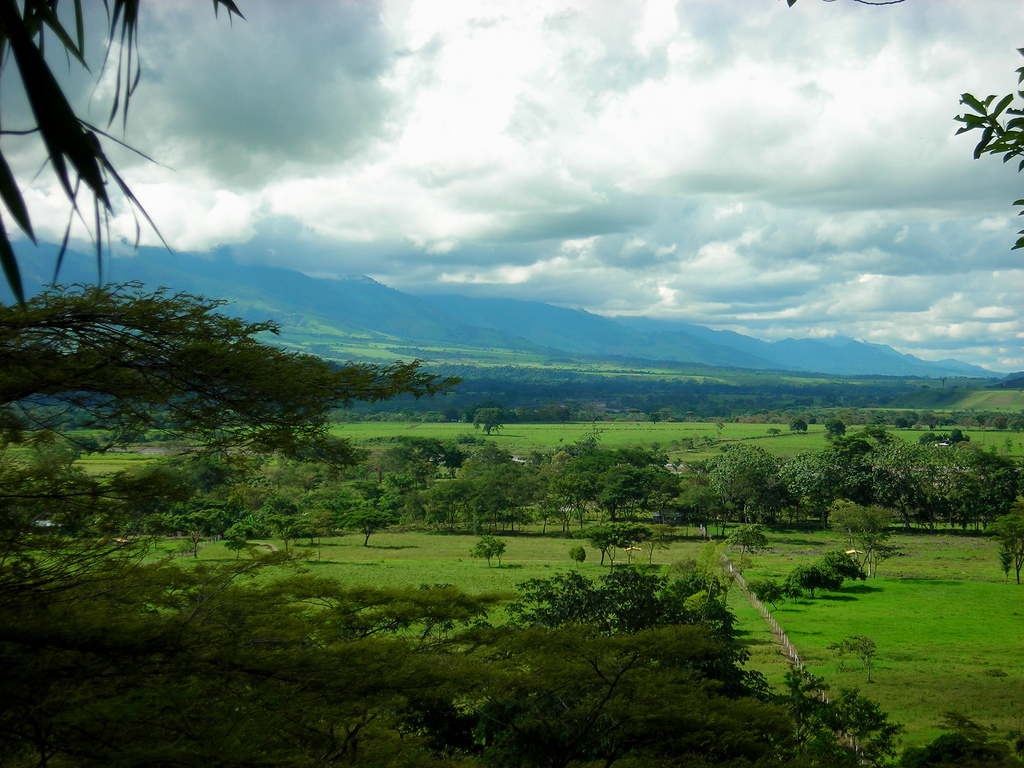
- Piedmont of Casanare

- Flag Coat of arms
- Motto: Trabajo y Libertad (Spanish: Work and Freedom)
- Anthem: Himno de Casanare
- Casanare shown in red

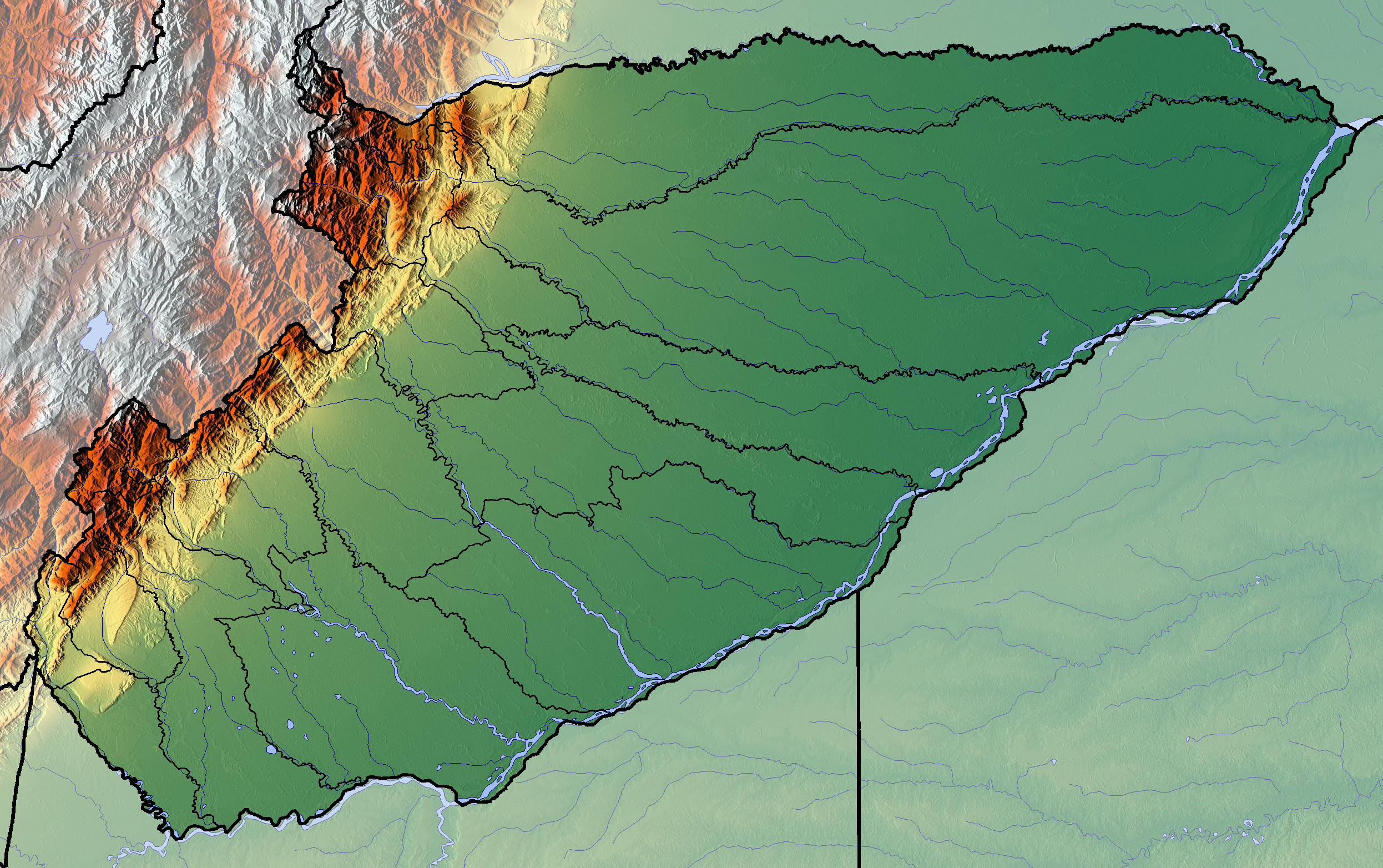
- Topography of the department
- Coordinates: 5°21′0″N 72°24′36″W
- Country: Colombia
- Region: Orinoquía Region
- Department: 1991
- Province: 1660
- Capital: Yopal

Government
  - Governor: Salomon Andres Sanabria (2020-2023)

Area
  - Total: 44,640 km^{2} (17,240 sq mi)
  - Rank: 10th
- Elevation: 350 m (1,150 ft)

Population (2018)
  - Total: 420,504
  - Rank: 25th
  - Density: 9.420/km^{2} (24.40/sq mi)

GDP
  - Total: COP 23,661 billion (US$ 5.6 billion)
- Time zone: UTC-05
- ISO 3166 code: CO-CAS
- Municipalities: 19
- HDI: 0.770 high · 16th of 33
- Website: www.casanare.gov.co

Casanare (Spanish pronunciation: [kasaˈnaɾe], Spanish: Departamento de Casanare) is a department located in the central eastern of Colombia. It is famous for its oil and natural gas production as well as its livestock and extensive plains. It is also the tenth largest department with an area of 44,490 km^{2}, similar to that of Denmark, but also the seventh least densely populated.

Its capital is Yopal, which is also the episcopal seat of the Roman Catholic Diocese of Yopal.

It contains oil fields and an 800 km pipeline leading to the coastal port of Coveñas owned by BP.

== Rivers and dams ==
The Upía River (Río Upía) is in Casanare. Casanare, Ariporo, Guachiría, Guanapalo, Pauto, Tocaría, Cravo Sur, Cusiana, Túa y Upía.

== History ==
Historical population
Year	Pop.	±%
1973	-	—
1985	147,472	—
1993	211,329	+43.3%
2005	295,353	+39.8%
2018	420,504	+42.4%

A former subregion of Boyacá, Casanare became a separate department in 1973.

== Municipalities ==
1. Aguazul
2. Chámeza
3. Hato Corozal
4. La Salina
5. Maní
6. Monterrey
7. Nunchía
8. Orocué
9. Paz de Ariporo
10. Pore
11. Recetor
12. Sabanalarga
13. Sácama
14. San Luis de Palenque
15. Támara
16. Tauramena
17. Trinidad
18. Villanueva
19. Yopal, capital

== Flag ==
The flag is divided diagonally from the upper-fly corner to the lower-hoist corner. The upper-hoist triangle is red and the lower-fly triangle, green. At the center of the flag is an eight pointed sun in yellow. The meanings attributed to the elements are that the color red symbolizes the blood spilled by its heroes, the color green its natural resources and its prairies, and the sun has eight corners that represent each letter of the word CASANARE.

== See also ==
- Apostolic Vicariate of Casanare
- Casanare Province (historical)
- Casanare River

== Sources and external links ==
- (in Spanish) Government of Casanare official website
