= Guacarí =

San Juan Bautista de Guacarí
- Municipality and town
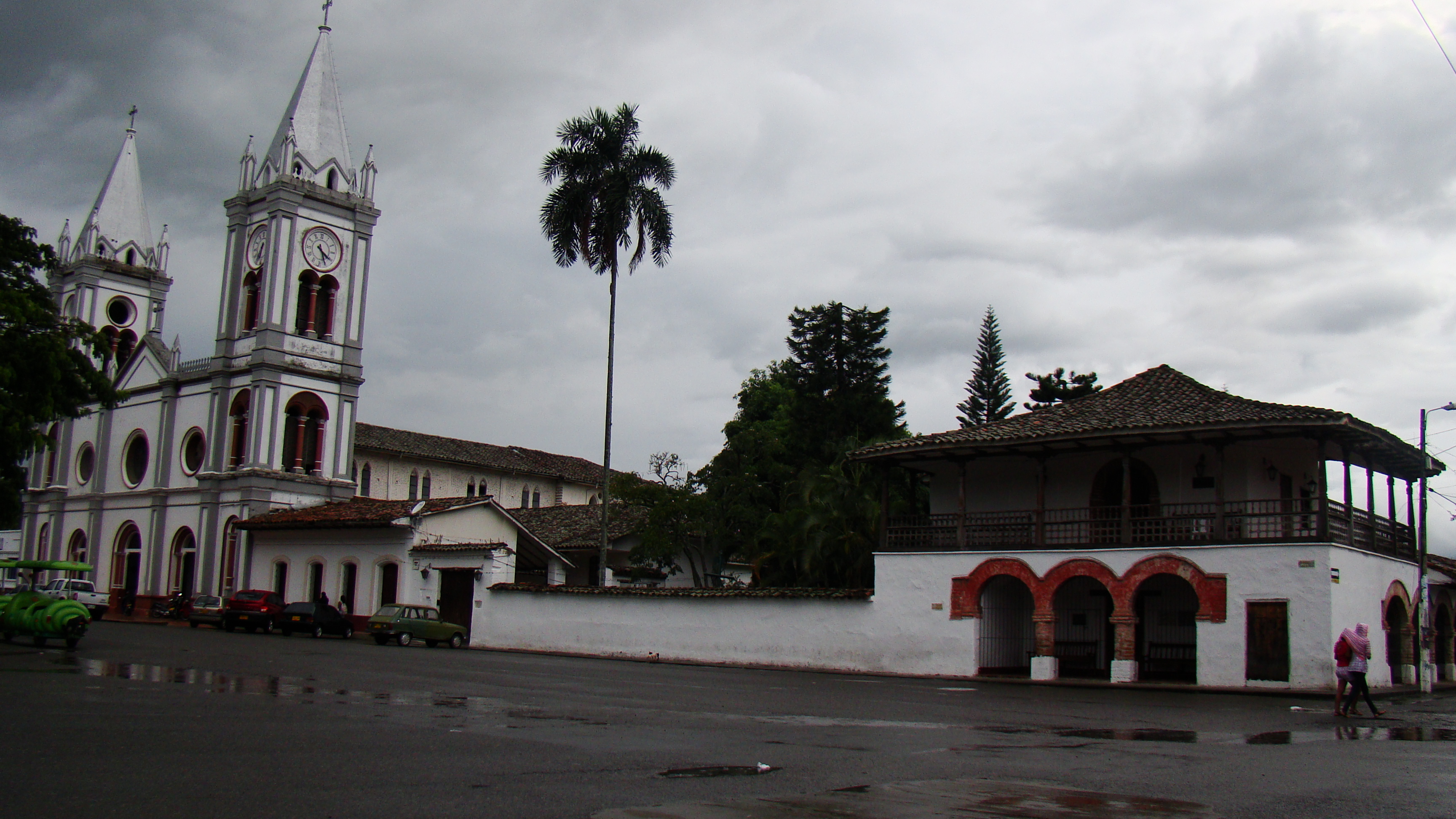
- Town of Guacari

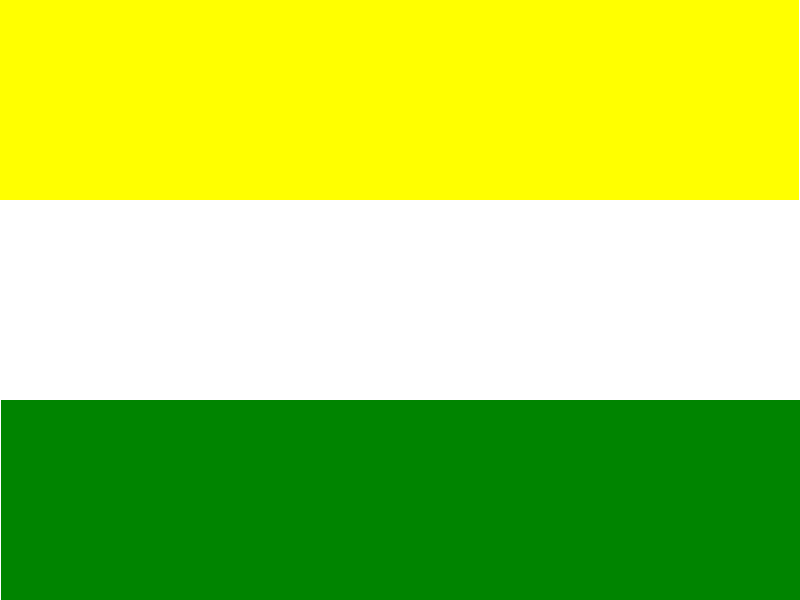
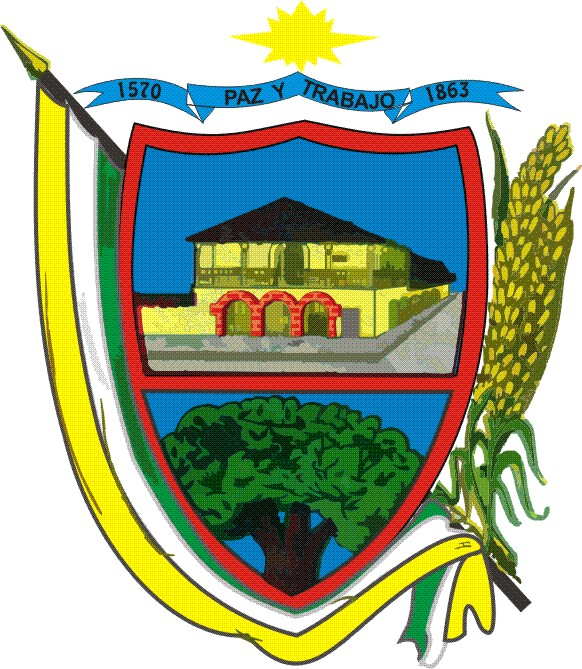
- Flag Coat of arms
- Nickname: Guacarí, Colombia
- Motto: Guacarí Tierra de Todos
- Location of the town and municipality of Guacari in the Valle del Cauca Department.

- Location within Colombia
- Coordinates: 3°45′48.51″N 76°20′2.58″W
- Country: Colombia

Area
  - Municipality and town: 162.5 km^{2} (62.7 sq mi)
  - Urban: 2.23 km^{2} (0.86 sq mi)

Population (2018 census)
  - Municipality and town: 33,191
  - Density: 204.3/km^{2} (529.0/sq mi)
  - Urban: 20,421
  - Urban density: 9,160/km^{2} (23,700/sq mi)
- postal code: 76318000

Guacarí is a town and municipality located in the Department of Valle del Cauca, Colombia.
