= Pana Pana =

Coordinates: 1°51′N 69°00′W

- Municipality and town
- Location of the municipality and town of Pana Pana in the Guainía Department of Colombia.
- Country: Colombia
- Department: Guainía Department
- Time zone: UTC-5 (Colombia Standard Time)

Pana Pana is a town and municipality located in the Guainía Department, Republic of Colombia.
