= Piedras =

Coordinates: 4°30′N 74°55′W

- Municipality and town
- Flag Coat of arms

- Location of the municipality and town of Piedras in the Colombian department of Tolima.
- Country: Colombia
- Department: Tolima

Government
  - mayor: Pedro Antonio Bocanegra Zabala

Area
  - Total: 355.15 km^{2} (137.12 sq mi)
- Elevation: 403 m (1,322 ft)

Population (2017)
  - Total: 5,662
- Time zone: UTC-5 (Colombia Standard Time)

Piedras (Spanish pronunciation: [ˈpjeðɾas]) is a town and municipality in the Colombian department of Tolima. The population of the municipality was 4,421 as of the 1993 census.
