= Tauramena =

Coordinates: 5°01′N 72°45′W

- Municipality and town
- Flag Coat of arms

- Location of the municipality and town of Tauramena in the Casanare Department of Colombia.
- Country: Colombia
- Department: Casanare Department

Population (Census 2018)
  - Total: 21,709
- Time zone: UTC-5 (Colombia Standard Time)

Tauramena is a town and municipality in the Department of Casanare, Colombia.

== Climate ==
Tauramena has a tropical monsoon climate (Köppen Am) with moderate to little rainfall from December to March and heavy to very heavy rainfall from April to November.

Climate data for Tauramena, elevation 460 m (1,510 ft), (1981–2010)
Month	Jan	Feb	Mar	Apr	May	Jun	Jul	Aug	Sep	Oct	Nov	Dec	Year
Mean daily maximum °C (°F)	31.4 (88.5)	32.0 (89.6)	31.7 (89.1)	30.2 (86.4)	29.6 (85.3)	28.9 (84.0)	28.7 (83.7)	29.2 (84.6)	29.8 (85.6)	30.2 (86.4)	30.1 (86.2)	30.4 (86.7)	30.1 (86.2)
Daily mean °C (°F)	26.2 (79.2)	26.5 (79.7)	26.3 (79.3)	25.5 (77.9)	25.2 (77.4)	24.8 (76.6)	24.4 (75.9)	24.9 (76.8)	25.3 (77.5)	25.5 (77.9)	25.6 (78.1)	25.9 (78.6)	25.5 (77.9)
Mean daily minimum °C (°F)	20.7 (69.3)	21.3 (70.3)	21.8 (71.2)	21.4 (70.5)	21.0 (69.8)	20.8 (69.4)	20.5 (68.9)	20.6 (69.1)	20.6 (69.1)	20.8 (69.4)	20.9 (69.6)	20.8 (69.4)	20.9 (69.6)
Average precipitation mm (inches)	15.7 (0.62)	52.8 (2.08)	129.2 (5.09)	343.2 (13.51)	433.8 (17.08)	444.8 (17.51)	386.0 (15.20)	331.3 (13.04)	311.1 (12.25)	306.3 (12.06)	190.7 (7.51)	57.3 (2.26)	3,002.3 (118.20)
Average precipitation days	3	5	9	17	21	21	22	19	16	15	13	6	161
Average relative humidity (%)	77	75	73	81	83	85	84	84	82	81	82	81	81
Source: Instituto de Hidrologia Meteorologia y Estudios Ambientales
