= Yavaraté =

Coordinates: 0°37′N 69°12′W

- Corregimiento and town
- Location of the town and Department Municipality of Yavaraté in the Vaupés Department of Colombia.
- Country: Colombia
- Department: Vaupés Department

Area
  - Total: 3,459 km^{2} (1,336 sq mi)
- Elevation: 97 m (318 ft)

Population (2015)
  - Total: 1,269
  - Density: 0.3669/km^{2} (0.9502/sq mi)
- Time zone: UTC-5 (Colombia Standard Time)

Yavaraté is a town and Department Municipality in the department of Vaupés, in Colombia. It is located to the south east of the department's capital, Mitú, on the banks on the Vaupés and Maya rivers, on the border with Brazil. The closest town is Iauaretê, an indigenous village located in Brazil, across the Vaupés River.
