= Pore, Casanare =

Coordinates: 5.72722°N 71.9947°W

- Municipality and town
- Flag Coat of arms

- Location of the municipality and town of Pore, Casanare in the Casanare Department of Colombia.
- Country: Colombia
- Region: Orinoquía Region
- Department: Casanare Department
- Time zone: UTC-5 (Colombia Standard Time)

Pore is a town and municipality in the Department of Casanare, Colombia.

Pore, which played a vital role during the independence movement, was the 18th town to be declared a Pueblo Patrimonio de Colombia (Heritage Town of Colombia) on March 1, 2021. It is the first municipality east of the Andes to be inducted into the Pueblo Patrimonio network.

History

Pore was founded on November 5, 1644, by Adriano Vargas and Francisco Enciso. In that same century, the Jesuits managed to organize solid farms that, focused on cattle production, offered the region great economic development, a situation that, together with the commercial relations that it maintained with Venezuela and Tunja, in addition to the particular conditions of the national independence, led to its being assigned the title of capital of the province of Nueva Granada in 1818.

Pore was also the scene where Bolívar's troops met those of Santander to head towards the Boyacá bridge, where victory was achieved in the decisive battle for freedom.

Through Law 936 of December 30, 2004, it was declared a historical and cultural heritage of the nation.3
