= Zona Bananera, Magdalena =

Coordinates: 10.7647°N 74.1586°W

Zona Bananera
- municipality
- Flag

- Location of the municipality and town of Zona Bananera in the Department of Magdalena.
- Country: Colombia
- Region: Caribbean
- Department: Magdalena

Population (2005)
  - Total: 56,504
- Time zone: UTC-5
- Website: zapayan-magdalena.gov.co

Zona Bananera (Spanish pronunciation: [ˈsona βanaˈneɾa]) is a municipality of the Magdalena Department in northern Colombia. Its main town is Prado Sevilla.

== Climate ==
Climate data for Zona Bananera (Prado Sevilla), elevation 18 m (59 ft), (1981–2010)
Month	Jan	Feb	Mar	Apr	May	Jun	Jul	Aug	Sep	Oct	Nov	Dec	Year
Mean daily maximum °C (°F)	33.2 (91.8)	33.7 (92.7)	34.1 (93.4)	34.2 (93.6)	33.4 (92.1)	33.1 (91.6)	33.1 (91.6)	33.2 (91.8)	32.9 (91.2)	32.5 (90.5)	32.3 (90.1)	32.7 (90.9)	33.2 (91.8)
Daily mean °C (°F)	27 (81)	27.7 (81.9)	28.3 (82.9)	28.4 (83.1)	27.9 (82.2)	27.5 (81.5)	27.4 (81.3)	27.4 (81.3)	27.1 (80.8)	26.8 (80.2)	26.8 (80.2)	26.9 (80.4)	27.4 (81.3)
Mean daily minimum °C (°F)	20.2 (68.4)	20.8 (69.4)	21.6 (70.9)	22.5 (72.5)	22.6 (72.7)	21.7 (71.1)	22.2 (72.0)	21.9 (71.4)	21.7 (71.1)	21.7 (71.1)	21.6 (70.9)	20.7 (69.3)	21.6 (70.9)
Average precipitation mm (inches)	2.4 (0.09)	3.1 (0.12)	9.9 (0.39)	73.0 (2.87)	177.9 (7.00)	160.2 (6.31)	143.9 (5.67)	181.9 (7.16)	241.1 (9.49)	276.3 (10.88)	143.8 (5.66)	38.5 (1.52)	1,451.9 (57.16)
Average precipitation days	1	1	2	6	13	13	11	15	16	16	10	3	108
Average relative humidity (%)	80	78	77	79	81	83	82	82	83	85	84	82	81
Mean monthly sunshine hours	254.2	234.3	213.9	195.0	186.0	180.0	198.4	192.2	168.0	179.8	192.0	207.7	2,401.5
Mean daily sunshine hours	8.2	8.3	6.9	6.5	6.0	6.0	6.4	6.2	5.6	5.8	6.4	6.7	6.6
Source: Instituto de Hidrologia Meteorologia y Estudios Ambientales
