= San Pedro, Valle del Cauca =

Coordinates: 4°N 76.2292°W

- Municipality and town
- Flag Coat of arms

- Location of the municipality and town of San Pedro, Valle del Cauca in the Valle del Cauca Department of Colombia.
- Country: Colombia
- Department: Valle del Cauca Department
- Elevation: 220 m (720 ft)

Population (2015)
  - Total: 18,128
- Time zone: UTC-5 (Colombia Standard Time)

San Pedro (Spanish pronunciation: [sam ˈpeðɾo]) is a town and municipality located in the Department of Valle del Cauca, Colombia.

Founded by Jorge de Herrera y Gaitán in 1797, its first inhabitants were Indians called Chancos, who fought against the forces sent by Belarcarzal until well into the early eighteen hundreds. Tulua Amerindians, who practiced ritual cannibalism.

San Pedro became famous for their fine musicians and composers. Like any other South American town, San Pedro became Catholic from the very beginning. Nowadays, it is famous also for its billiard cues. Around June 28, which is their saint's celebration, Sanpedrenos celebrate also their annual fair, that usually invites local and foreign musical bands. There is a local pageant to elect their annual Senorita San Pedro.
