= Hato Corozal =

Coordinates: 3°11′N 73°45′W

- Municipality and town
- Flag

- Location of the municipality and town of Hato Corozal in the Casanare Department of Colombia.
- Country: Colombia
- Region: Orinoquía Region
- Department: Casanare Department

Area
  - Total: 56 km^{2} (22 sq mi)

Population (Census 2018)
  - Total: 11,431
  - Density: 200/km^{2} (530/sq mi)
- Time zone: UTC-5 (Colombia Standard Time)

Hato Corozal (Spanish pronunciation: [ˈato koɾoˈsal]) is a town and municipality in the Department of Casanare, Colombia.
