= Campoalegre =

Coordinates: 2°41′12″N 75°19′32″W

- Municipality and town
- Flag Coat of arms

- Location of the municipality and town of Campoalegre in the Huila Department of Colombia.
- Country: Colombia
- Department: Huila Department

Area
  - Municipality and town: 462.8 km^{2} (178.7 sq mi)
  - Urban: 3.6 km^{2} (1.4 sq mi)

Population (2020 est.)
  - Municipality and town: 35,057
  - Density: 75.75/km^{2} (196.2/sq mi)
  - Urban: 23,818
  - Urban density: 6,600/km^{2} (17,000/sq mi)
- Time zone: UTC-5 (Colombia Standard Time)

Campoalegre (Spanish pronunciation: [kampoaˈleɣɾe]) is a town and municipality in the Huila Department, Colombia.

== Climate ==
Climate data for Campoalegre (Rosales Los), elevation 553 m (1,814 ft), (1981–2010)
Month	Jan	Feb	Mar	Apr	May	Jun	Jul	Aug	Sep	Oct	Nov	Dec	Year
Mean daily maximum °C (°F)	31.8 (89.2)	31.9 (89.4)	31.5 (88.7)	31.3 (88.3)	31.6 (88.9)	32.0 (89.6)	32.5 (90.5)	33.5 (92.3)	34.0 (93.2)	32.5 (90.5)	30.8 (87.4)	30.8 (87.4)	32.0 (89.6)
Daily mean °C (°F)	26.3 (79.3)	26.5 (79.7)	26.2 (79.2)	25.9 (78.6)	26.1 (79.0)	26.3 (79.3)	26.7 (80.1)	27.5 (81.5)	27.9 (82.2)	26.8 (80.2)	25.8 (78.4)	25.7 (78.3)	26.5 (79.7)
Mean daily minimum °C (°F)	21.2 (70.2)	21.4 (70.5)	21.3 (70.3)	21.2 (70.2)	21.3 (70.3)	21.2 (70.2)	21.4 (70.5)	21.9 (71.4)	21.9 (71.4)	21.6 (70.9)	21.3 (70.3)	21.1 (70.0)	21.4 (70.5)
Average precipitation mm (inches)	115.4 (4.54)	112.6 (4.43)	160.4 (6.31)	131.0 (5.16)	102.2 (4.02)	37.3 (1.47)	36.2 (1.43)	23.6 (0.93)	46.3 (1.82)	164.0 (6.46)	206.8 (8.14)	169.4 (6.67)	1,298.2 (51.11)
Average precipitation days	11	12	16	17	16	14	12	10	11	16	17	14	165
Average relative humidity (%)	71	70	73	74	72	67	61	55	56	67	76	76	68
Mean monthly sunshine hours	176.7	144.0	127.1	126.0	136.4	138.0	142.6	142.6	132.0	148.8	144.0	158.1	1,716.3
Mean daily sunshine hours	5.7	5.1	4.1	4.2	4.4	4.6	4.6	4.6	4.4	4.8	4.8	5.1	4.7
Source: Instituto de Hidrologia Meteorologia y Estudios Ambientales

Climate data for Campoalegre (Hidrobetania), elevation 500 m (1,600 ft), (1981–2010)
Month	Jan	Feb	Mar	Apr	May	Jun	Jul	Aug	Sep	Oct	Nov	Dec	Year
Mean daily maximum °C (°F)	32.3 (90.1)	32.6 (90.7)	31.9 (89.4)	31.9 (89.4)	31.7 (89.1)	31.6 (88.9)	30.0 (86.0)	32.6 (90.7)	33.2 (91.8)	30.5 (86.9)	29.3 (84.7)	29.4 (84.9)	31.5 (88.7)
Daily mean °C (°F)	27.4 (81.3)	27.6 (81.7)	26.9 (80.4)	26.8 (80.2)	27.1 (80.8)	27.2 (81.0)	27.3 (81.1)	27.9 (82.2)	28.1 (82.6)	27.2 (81.0)	26.3 (79.3)	26.4 (79.5)	27.2 (81.0)
Mean daily minimum °C (°F)	21.7 (71.1)	21.5 (70.7)	21.5 (70.7)	21.4 (70.5)	21.7 (71.1)	22.0 (71.6)	22.1 (71.8)	22.6 (72.7)	22.5 (72.5)	21.5 (70.7)	21.1 (70.0)	21.3 (70.3)	21.7 (71.1)
Average precipitation mm (inches)	145.5 (5.73)	142.4 (5.61)	176.5 (6.95)	137.2 (5.40)	128.9 (5.07)	37.5 (1.48)	34.5 (1.36)	22.2 (0.87)	47.8 (1.88)	177.6 (6.99)	254.4 (10.02)	169.7 (6.68)	1,440.8 (56.72)
Average precipitation days	9	10	13	12	10	6	6	4	5	12	15	13	116
Average relative humidity (%)	71	70	75	73	71	66	63	59	59	68	75	75	69
Source: Instituto de Hidrologia Meteorologia y Estudios Ambientales
