= Maní, Casanare =

Coordinates: 4°49′N 72°17′W

- Municipality and town
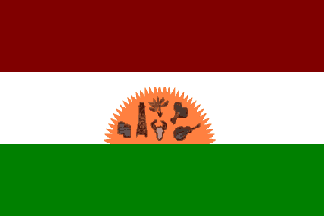
- Flag

- Location of the municipality and town of Maní, Casanare in the Casanare Department of Colombia.
- Country: Colombia
- Region: Orinoquía Region
- Department: Casanare Department

Area
  - Total: 3,784 km^{2} (1,461 sq mi)

Population (Census 2018)
  - Total: 13,291
  - Density: 3.512/km^{2} (9.097/sq mi)
- Time zone: UTC-5 (Colombia Standard Time)

Maní is a town and municipality in the Department of Casanare, Colombia.
