= Ambalema =

Coordinates: 4°47′N 74°46′W

- Municipality and town
- Flag Coat of arms

- Location of the municipality and town of Ambalema in the Tolima Department of Colombia.
- Country: Colombia
- Department: Tolima Department

Government
  - Mayor: Juan Carlos Chavarro Rojas

Area
  - Total: 239 km^{2} (92 sq mi)
- Elevation: 241 m (791 ft)

Population (2017)
  - Total: 6,683
- Time zone: UTC-5 (Colombia Standard Time)

Ambalema is a municipality in the Tolima department of Colombia. The population of Ambalema was 7,277 as of the 1993 census.

== Climate ==
Climate data for Ambalema (Salto El), elevation 450 m (1,480 ft), (1981–2010)
Month	Jan	Feb	Mar	Apr	May	Jun	Jul	Aug	Sep	Oct	Nov	Dec	Year
Mean daily maximum °C (°F)	34.3 (93.7)	34.4 (93.9)	34.2 (93.6)	33.4 (92.1)	33.1 (91.6)	34.0 (93.2)	35.5 (95.9)	35.8 (96.4)	34.9 (94.8)	32.8 (91.0)	32.5 (90.5)	33.3 (91.9)	34.0 (93.2)
Daily mean °C (°F)	29.0 (84.2)	29.2 (84.6)	29.1 (84.4)	28.2 (82.8)	28.1 (82.6)	28.8 (83.8)	29.9 (85.8)	30.3 (86.5)	29.4 (84.9)	28.0 (82.4)	27.8 (82.0)	28.4 (83.1)	28.8 (83.8)
Mean daily minimum °C (°F)	23.2 (73.8)	23.3 (73.9)	23.3 (73.9)	23.0 (73.4)	22.9 (73.2)	22.9 (73.2)	23.1 (73.6)	23.1 (73.6)	23.0 (73.4)	22.6 (72.7)	22.8 (73.0)	23.0 (73.4)	23.0 (73.4)
Average precipitation mm (inches)	56.2 (2.21)	73.7 (2.90)	97.9 (3.85)	194.5 (7.66)	170.9 (6.73)	59.9 (2.36)	44.8 (1.76)	78.7 (3.10)	160.9 (6.33)	192.2 (7.57)	136.2 (5.36)	83.5 (3.29)	1,347.3 (53.04)
Average precipitation days	6	8	10	16	15	8	7	9	13	17	13	8	129
Mean monthly sunshine hours	195.3	160.9	148.8	147.0	167.4	171.0	198.4	195.3	174.0	167.4	168.0	182.9	2,076.4
Mean daily sunshine hours	6.3	5.7	4.8	4.9	5.4	5.7	6.4	6.3	5.8	5.4	5.6	5.9	5.7
Source: Instituto de Hidrologia Meteorologia y Estudios Ambientales
