= Alvarado, Tolima =

Coordinates: 4°34′N 74°57′W

- Municipality and town
- Flag Coat of arms

- Location of the municipality and town of Alvarado, Tolima in the Tolima Department of Colombia.
- Country: Colombia
- Department: Tolima Department

Government
  - Mayor: Pablo Emilio Lopez Trujillo

Area
  - Total: 311.15 km^{2} (120.14 sq mi)
- Elevation: 439 m (1,440 ft)

Population (2017)
  - Total: 8,796
- Time zone: UTC-5 (Colombia Standard Time)

Alvarado is a city and municipality in the Tolima department of Colombia. The population of the municipality was 7,589 as of the 1993 census.
