= San Martín, Meta =

Coordinates: 3.69444°N 73.6936°W

- Municipality and town
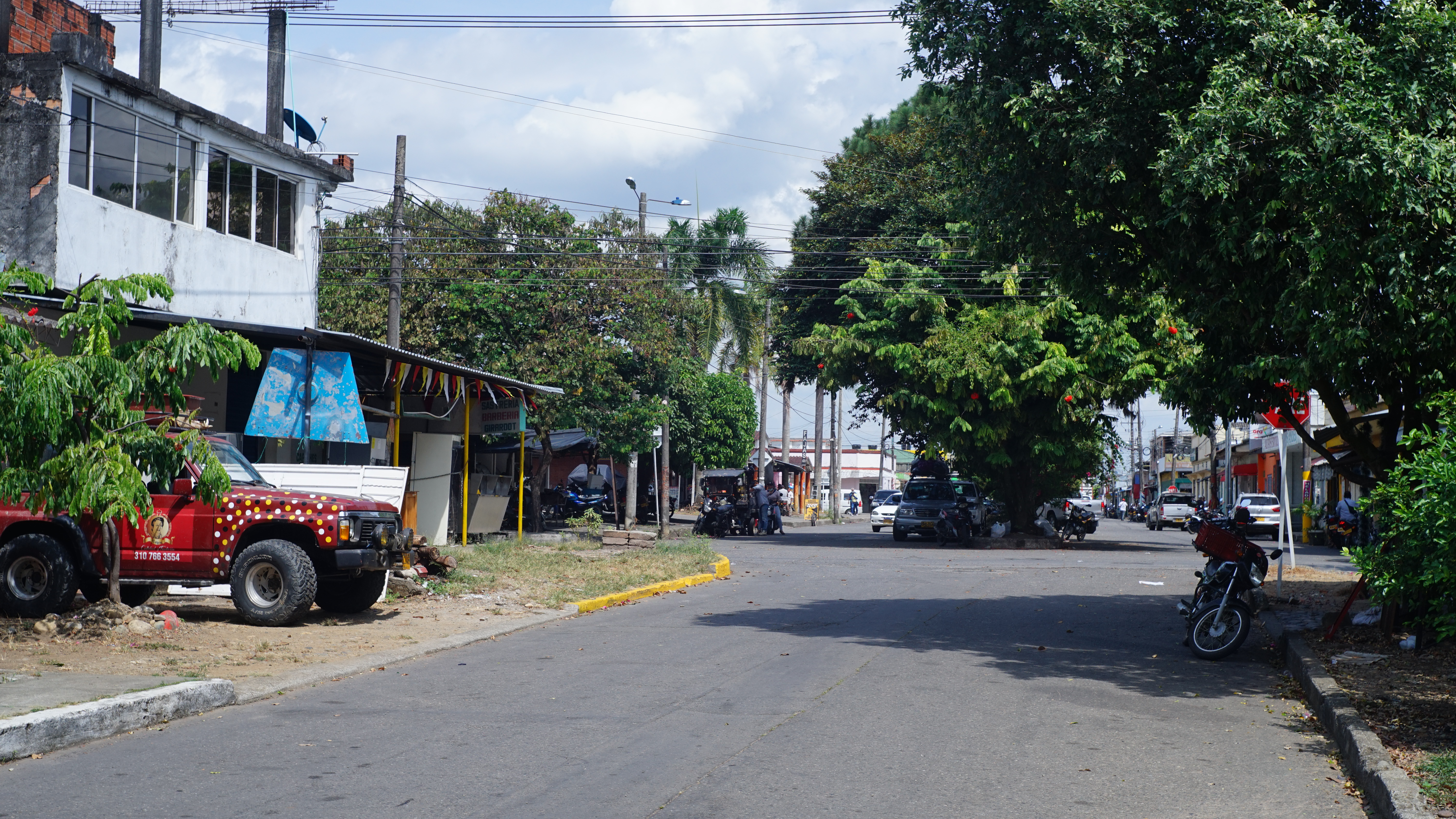
- Calle 9 in San Martin Colombia

- Flag Coat of arms

- Location of the municipality and town of San Martín, Meta in the Meta Department of Colombia.
- Country: Colombia
- Department: Meta Department

Area
  - Total: 6,454 km^{2} (2,492 sq mi)
- Elevation: 405 m (1,329 ft)

Population (Census 2018)
  - Total: 22,281
- Time zone: UTC-5 (Colombia Standard Time)
- Climate: Am
- Website: www.sanmartin-meta.gov.co/

San Martín is a town and municipality in the Meta Department, Colombia.

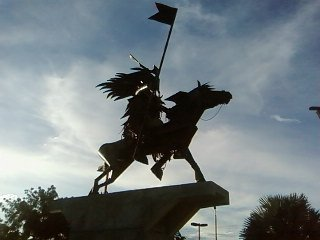
Statue in San Martin

== Climate ==
Climate data for San Martín (Barbasal), elevation 250 m (820 ft), (1981–2010)
Month	Jan	Feb	Mar	Apr	May	Jun	Jul	Aug	Sep	Oct	Nov	Dec	Year
Mean daily maximum °C (°F)	33.3 (91.9)	33.5 (92.3)	32.5 (90.5)	30.9 (87.6)	30.3 (86.5)	29.5 (85.1)	29.5 (85.1)	30.4 (86.7)	31.1 (88.0)	31.2 (88.2)	31.2 (88.2)	32.0 (89.6)	31.2 (88.2)
Daily mean °C (°F)	26.4 (79.5)	26.6 (79.9)	26.1 (79.0)	25.6 (78.1)	25.2 (77.4)	24.6 (76.3)	24.4 (75.9)	24.9 (76.8)	25.5 (77.9)	25.6 (78.1)	25.7 (78.3)	26.1 (79.0)	25.6 (78.1)
Mean daily minimum °C (°F)	20.3 (68.5)	20.7 (69.3)	21.4 (70.5)	21.7 (71.1)	21.6 (70.9)	21.2 (70.2)	21.0 (69.8)	21.0 (69.8)	21.1 (70.0)	21.4 (70.5)	21.4 (70.5)	21.0 (69.8)	21.2 (70.2)
Average precipitation mm (inches)	29.6 (1.17)	63.5 (2.50)	189.9 (7.48)	341.3 (13.44)	354.9 (13.97)	353.9 (13.93)	281.9 (11.10)	209.4 (8.24)	187.5 (7.38)	264.9 (10.43)	215.3 (8.48)	55.8 (2.20)	2,513.2 (98.94)
Average precipitation days	3	6	13	19	21	22	21	19	15	17	14	7	175
Average relative humidity (%)	76	76	81	85	86	87	87	86	84	84	84	80	83
Mean monthly sunshine hours	207.7	172.2	133.3	123.0	133.3	123.0	133.3	145.7	156.0	170.5	180.0	189.1	1,867.1
Mean daily sunshine hours	6.7	6.1	4.3	4.1	4.3	4.1	4.3	4.7	5.2	5.5	6.0	6.1	5.1
Source: Instituto de Hidrologia Meteorologia y Estudios Ambientales
