= Cabuyaro =

Coordinates: 4°17′N 72°47′W

- Municipality and town
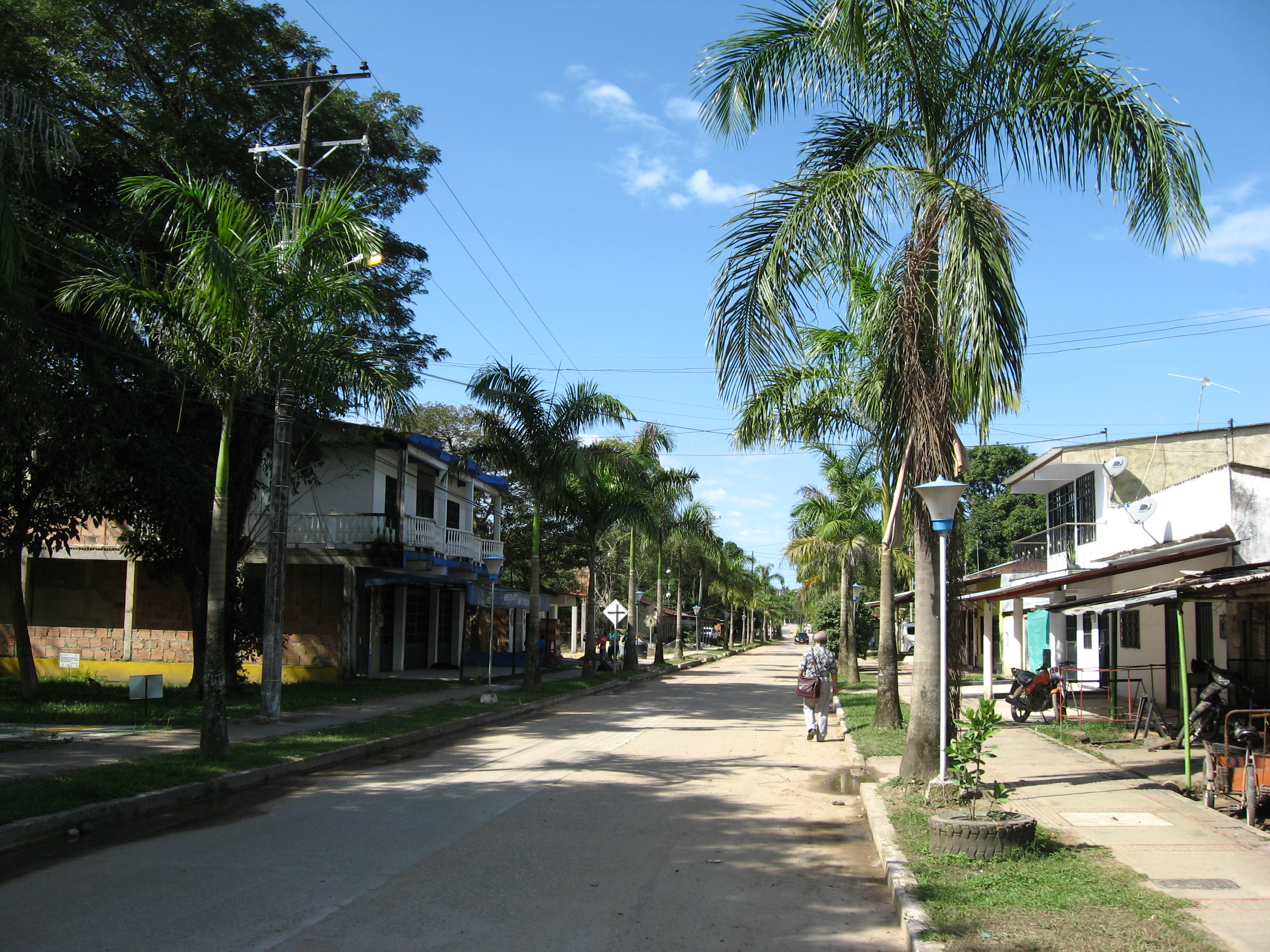
- View of Cabuyaro

- Flag

- Location of the municipality and town of Cabuyaro in the Meta Department of Colombia.
- Country: Colombia
- Department: Meta Department
- Elevation: 180 m (590 ft)
- Time zone: UTC-5 (Colombia Standard Time)
- Climate: Am

Cabuyaro is a town and municipality in the Meta Department, Colombia.
