= Castilla la Nueva, Meta =

- Municipality and town
- Flag

- Location of the municipality and town of Castilla la Nueva, Meta in the Meta Department of Colombia.
- Coordinates: 3°50′N 73°41′W
- Country: Colombia
- Department: Meta Department

Area
  - Total: 503 km^{2} (194 sq mi)
- Elevation: 350 m (1,150 ft)

Population (Census 2018)
  - Total: 13,611
  - Density: 27.1/km^{2} (70.1/sq mi)
- Time zone: UTC-5 (Colombia Standard Time)
- Climate: Am
- Website: http://www.castillalanueva.gov.co/

Castilla la Nueva is a town and municipality in the Meta Department, Colombia.
