= El Copey =

Coordinates: 10°09′N 73°58′W

- Town
- Flag Coat of arms

- Location of the municipality and town of El Copey in the Department of Cesar.
- Country: Colombia
- Region: Caribbean
- Department: Cesar

Government
  - Mayor: Pablo Ordoñez (Colombian Liberal Party)

Population (Census 2018)
  - Total: 28,550
- Time zone: UTC-5
- Website: elcopey-cesar.gov.co/

El Copey is a town and municipality in the Colombian Department of Cesar, in the northeast of Colombia. It is 105 km away from the capital of the department, Valledupar.
