= Villanueva, Casanare =

Coordinates: 4°36′31.45″N 72°55′43.65″W

- Municipality and town
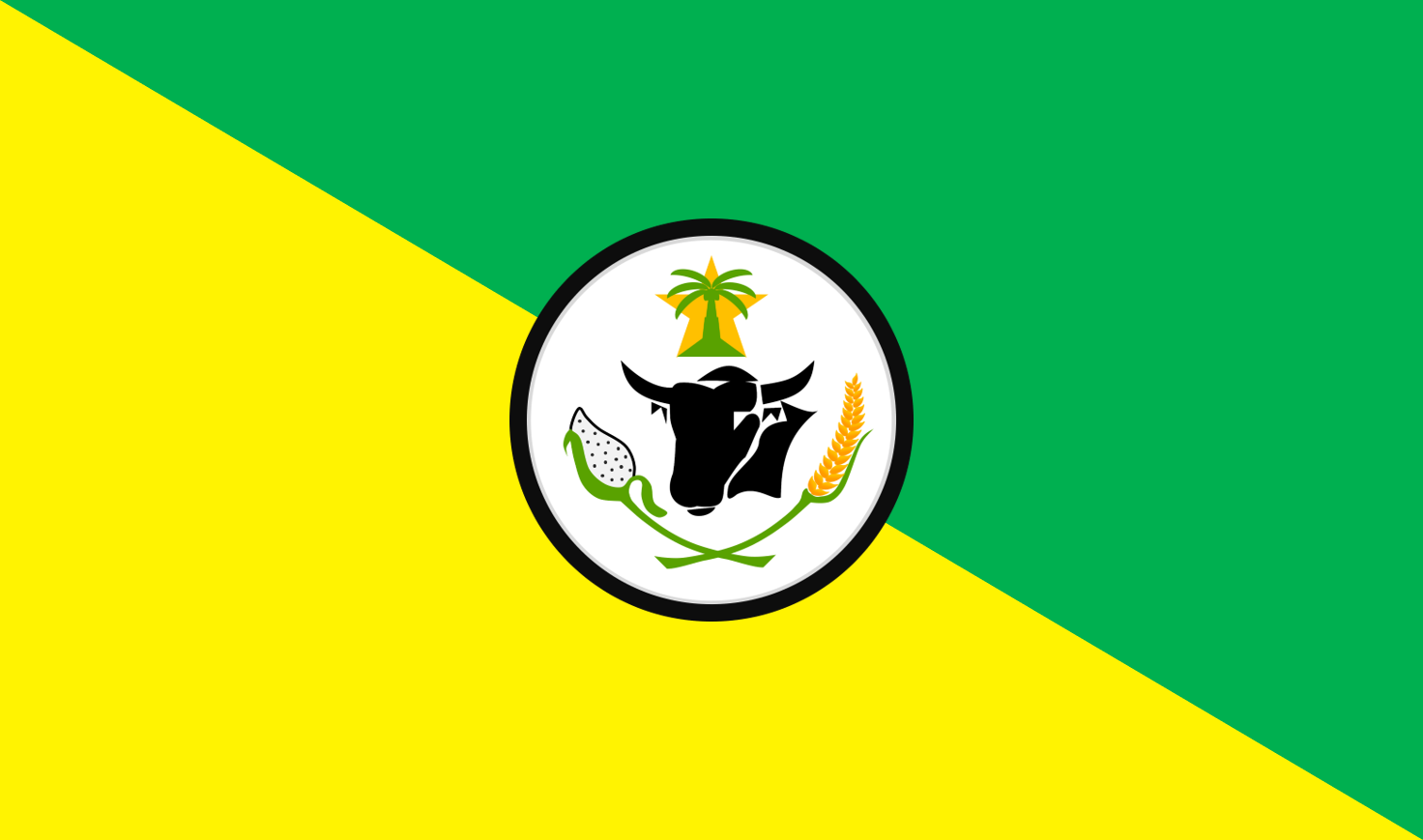
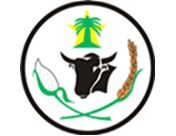
- Flag Seal

- Location of the municipality and town of Villanueva, Casanare in the Casanare Department of Colombia.
- Country: Colombia
- Department: Casanare Department

Population (Census 2018)
  - Total: 31,727
- Time zone: UTC-5 (Colombia Standard Time)

Villanueva is a town and municipality located in the Department of Casanare, Colombia. It is a rapidly growing community with ongoing urban development. Despite being one of the newer municipalities in the region, Villanueva has a robust and well-established economy. The residents of Villanueva actively participate in and celebrate the traditional Llano culture of Colombia.

== History ==
Villanueva is the youngest town in the Casanare department, with its first official mention dating back to November 13, 1962. The town's first inhabitant was Idelfonso López, who, along with other pioneering families, established the community. These founding families included the Arévalo, Barreto, Duque, Espinosa, Salgado, Segura, Mora, Vera, Mendoza, Daza, Rodríguez, and Doncel families.

The first house in Villanueva was constructed by Idelfonso López in 1963 using moriche and bahareque (types of palm and mud). That same year, the town's first school was established, beginning classes on July 28, 1963, with Misaelina Vargas Salinas serving as the inaugural teacher. Additionally, plans for the first market square, now known as Parque de los Fundadores, were created in 1962.

Initially, land in Villanueva was distributed for free to encourage settlement. Over time, the value of land increased, reflecting the town's development. From its humble beginnings as a small village with just a few houses and a school, Villanueva has expanded to include 20 neighborhoods in its urban area, 22 villages, and three townships: Caribayona, San Agustin, and Santa Helena del Upia.

== Government ==
Villanueva's municipal government is headed by a mayor elected by popular vote. Since the election of the first mayor, Rodrigo Rueda Arciniegas, on December 30, 1982, the municipality has been governed by approximately ten mayors, all from right-leaning or center-right political affiliations. The most recent mayor, Héctor Vizcaino Cagüeño, was elected on October 29, 2023. The Municipal Council, composed of 13 elected members, works alongside the mayor to make important decisions for the community.

== Economy ==
Although Villanueva is the youngest municipality in Casanare, its economy is well-developed, with agriculture serving as the primary economic sector. Key agricultural products include rice, cotton, yucca, and wood, with livestock also playing a significant role. The town hosts a rice mill for processing local production and is home to three major palm oil companies: Palmar del Oriente, Palmas Casanare, and Palmas Santana.

The third most important sector in Villanueva's economy involves the distribution of local products, either for further processing or direct consumption. Livestock farming is widespread, with ranches ranging from 100 to 2,000 hectares. Villanueva's economy also benefits from smaller-scale industries such as soybeans, cotton, bananas, cassava, citrus fruits, wood products, and cattle.

== Education ==
Education in Villanueva is predominantly public, with the most prominent institutions being Ezequiel Moreno y Díaz, Fabio Riveros, and Nuestra Señora de los Dolores de Manare. These schools operate multiple branches to cater to students of different ages, and their influence extends to surrounding villages and rural areas. In addition to public schools, there are several private institutions, including Lontananza Institution, Maria Montessori Educational Foundation, and Grandes Sabios. The M&M Foundation Forming Leaders, while not officially recognized by the Secretary of Education, offers supplementary education in Villanueva.

== Culture ==
Villanueva's culture is a blend of influences, with the Boyacense culture from the mountains and the Llanera culture from the valleys being the most prominent. The town's main cultural event is the Colonias festival, celebrated on the anniversary of Villanueva's foundation. This festival showcases the diverse cultures coexisting in the town, featuring traditional dances such as the Joropo and parades representing various regions of Colombia. The festival also includes concerts and other nighttime activities.

=== Cuisine ===
Villanueva is part of the Llanos Orientales region of Colombia, known for its cattle farming. Traditional dishes in the area include Pisillo (dried and minced meat), Sancocho (a soup with yucca, potatoes, plantains, beef, and pork), Hallacas (a dish made with chicken, beef, vegetables, and flour), and Tungos (a dish made of rice flour, butter, and sour milk, wrapped in banana leaves).

== Parks ==
Villanueva is home to six parks, the most notable being the main park located in front of the town hall. Other parks include the playground near the central area, the fire park adjacent to the fire station and municipal library, and the Morichal, El Bosque, and Villaluz parks located in neighborhoods bearing the same names.

== Climate ==
Villanueva has a temperate climate, with hot days and significant rainfall throughout the year. The summer season generally spans from the beginning to the end of the calendar year, while the rainy season typically begins in August. However, climate change has made these seasons less predictable. The average annual temperature ranges from 22°C to 35°C, with high humidity levels.

Climate data for Villanueva (Huerta La Grande), elevation 255 m (837 ft), (1981–2010)
Month	Jan	Feb	Mar	Apr	May	Jun	Jul	Aug	Sep	Oct	Nov	Dec	Year
Mean daily maximum °C (°F)	33.0 (91.4)	33.2 (91.8)	32.9 (91.2)	31.2 (88.2)	30.0 (86.0)	29.3 (84.7)	29.2 (84.6)	30.1 (86.2)	30.9 (87.6)	31.3 (88.3)	31.2 (88.2)	31.8 (89.2)	31.2 (88.2)
Daily mean °C (°F)	27.2 (81.0)	27.6 (81.7)	27.1 (80.8)	25.8 (78.4)	25.0 (77.0)	24.5 (76.1)	24.2 (75.6)	24.8 (76.6)	25.3 (77.5)	25.8 (78.4)	26.0 (78.8)	26.6 (79.9)	25.8 (78.4)
Mean daily minimum °C (°F)	21.8 (71.2)	22.3 (72.1)	22.5 (72.5)	22.0 (71.6)	21.4 (70.5)	21.0 (69.8)	20.8 (69.4)	21.2 (70.2)	21.4 (70.5)	21.7 (71.1)	21.9 (71.4)	21.8 (71.2)	21.6 (70.9)
Average precipitation mm (inches)	14.0 (0.55)	51.4 (2.02)	118.2 (4.65)	314.3 (12.37)	437.2 (17.21)	393.6 (15.50)	331.6 (13.06)	309.0 (12.17)	293.7 (11.56)	289.1 (11.38)	183.9 (7.24)	62.8 (2.47)	2,699.6 (106.28)
Average precipitation days	2	5	11	18	24	22	22	19	17	17	12	6	169
Average relative humidity (%)	64	63	69	79	84	85	84	82	80	79	78	72	77
Mean monthly sunshine hours	229.4	189.1	148.8	123.0	130.2	132.0	139.5	155.0	162.0	176.7	189.0	192.2	1,966.9
Mean daily sunshine hours	7.4	6.7	4.8	4.1	4.2	4.4	4.5	5.0	5.4	5.7	6.3	6.2	5.4
Source: Instituto de Hidrologia Meteorologia y Estudios Ambientales

== Notable residents ==
- Braian Angola (born 1994): A basketball player for Hapoel Tel Aviv in the Israeli Basketball Premier League. He was born in Villanueva on April 6, 1994, and is recognized both nationally and internationally. Angola is also known for his community project, Angola's Club, which provides training opportunities for young athletes and supports the development of local sports facilities.
- Edgar Mauricio Gómez Sánchez (born 1993): A Colombian soccer player who plays as a midfielder for Patriotas de Boyacá in the Colombian First A Category. He was born in Villanueva on December 21, 1993.
