= List of railway stations in Colombia =

This article contains a list of railway stations in Colombia. Few of these stations are currently served by passenger services since the state-owned Ferrocarriles Nacionales de Colombia (National Railways of Colombia) liquidated in the 1990s. This list includes systems which had been incorporated into the national system and others, and numerous stations that were served by passenger services in 1953. Some stations between Bogotá and Zipaquirá are served occasionally by Tren Turistico de la Sabana. There is currently regular daily passenger service provided by Coopsercol around Barrancabermeja.

== List ==
=== Ferrocarril del Occidente ===
(Opened in 1889)

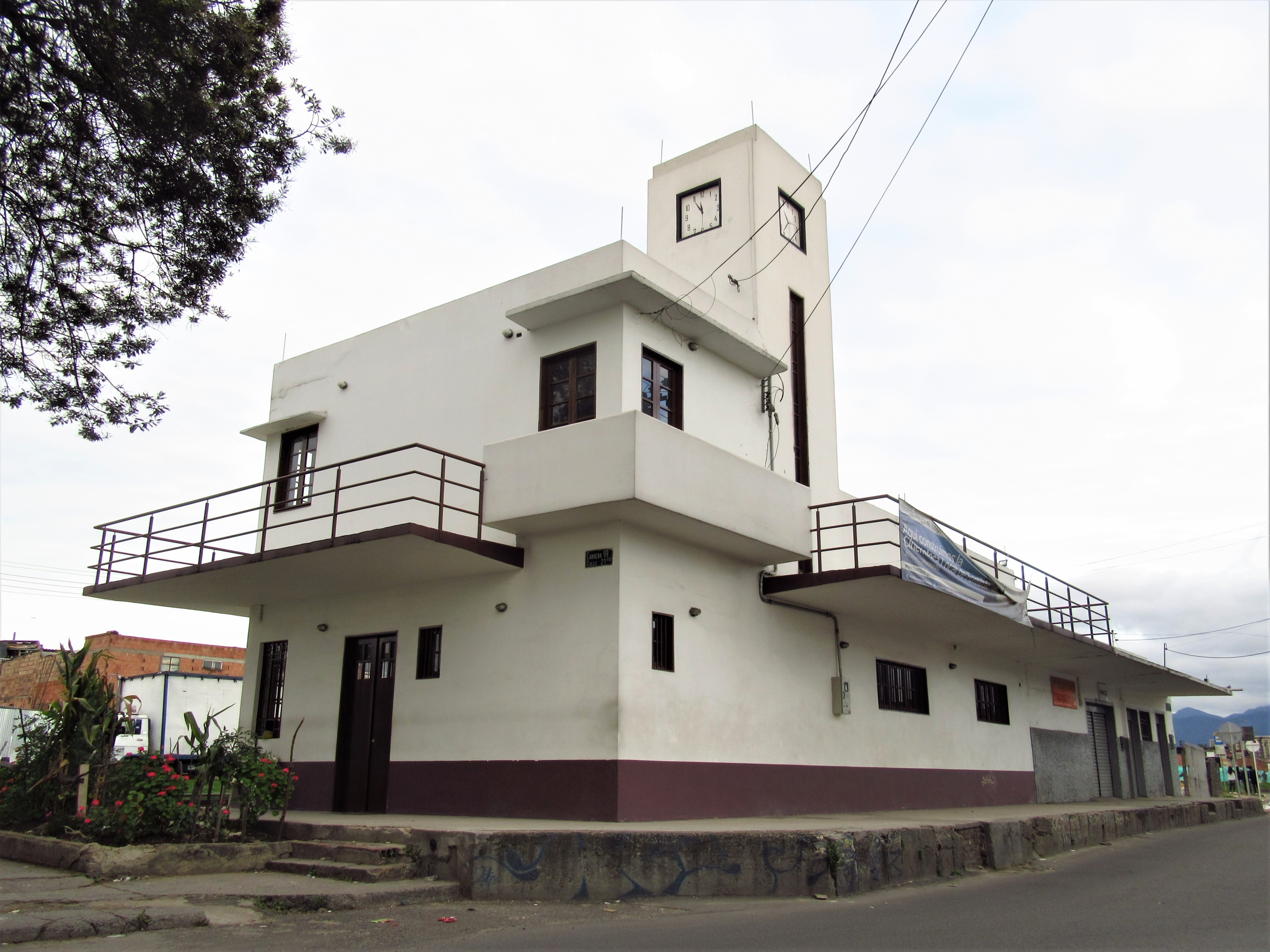
Estación del Ferrocarril Fontibón, in 2017

1. Bogotá La Sabana railway station, the main station of Bogotá
2. a station of Bogotá Puente Aranda
3. Estación del Ferrocarril Fontibón, at Bogotá Fontibón
4. a station at Mosquera
5. a station at Madrid
6. a station at Facatativá

=== Ferrocarril del Sur ===
1. a station at Bosa
2. a station at Soacha
3. a station at Alicachín, opened in 1916
4. Estación Santa Isabel, in Sibaté, opened in 1926
5. a station at San Miguel, opened in 1930

=== Ferrocarril del Norte ===
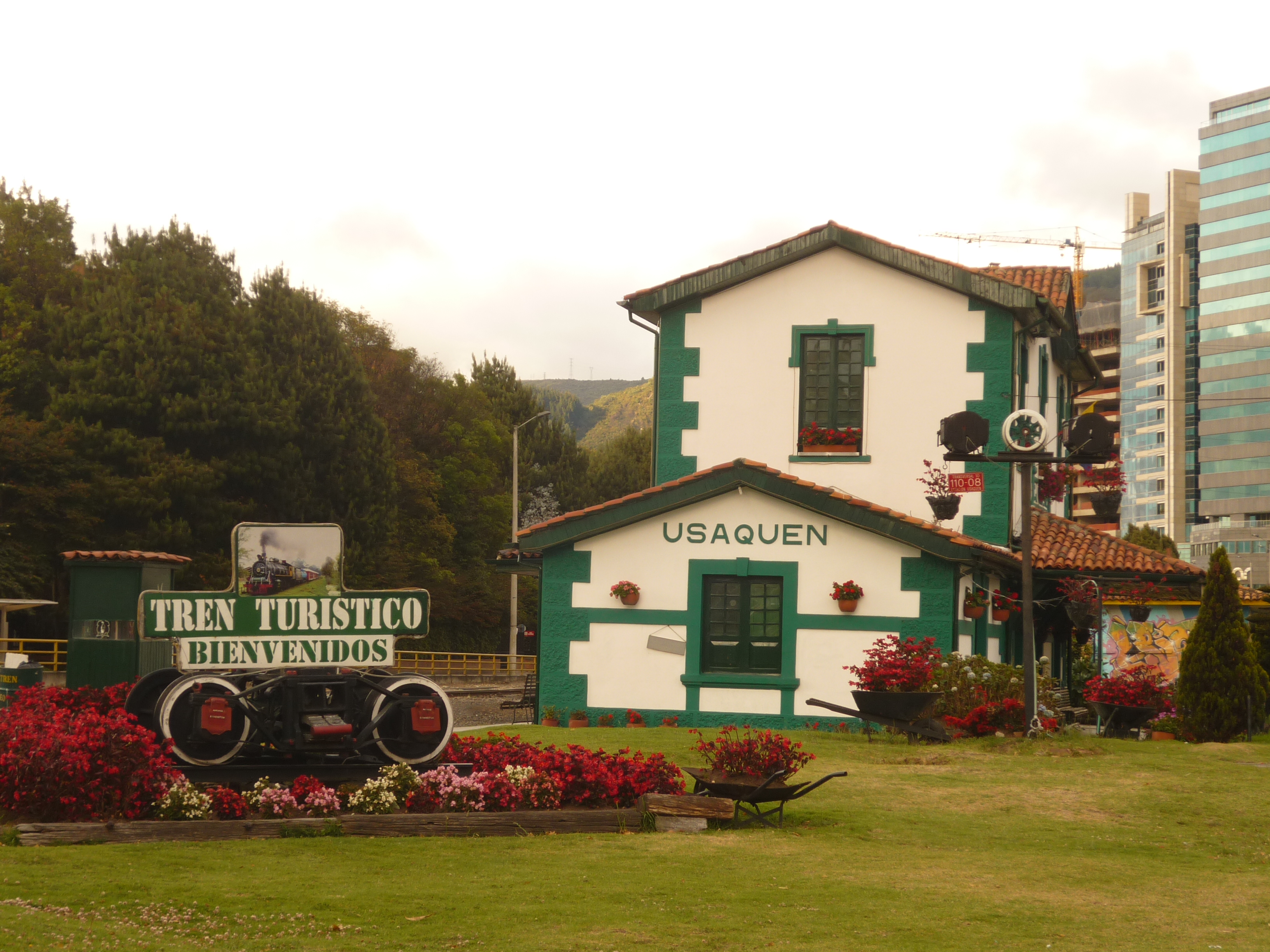
Estación Usaquén, Bogotá

1. Estación M. A. Caro, known as "La Caro", at Puente del Común (junction), opened in 1894
2. a station at Cajicá, opened in 1896
3. a station at Zipaquirá, opened in 1898
4. a station at Nemocón - opened in 1907
5. Estación Usaquén, Bogotá

=== Ruta Cúcuta-Pamplona ===
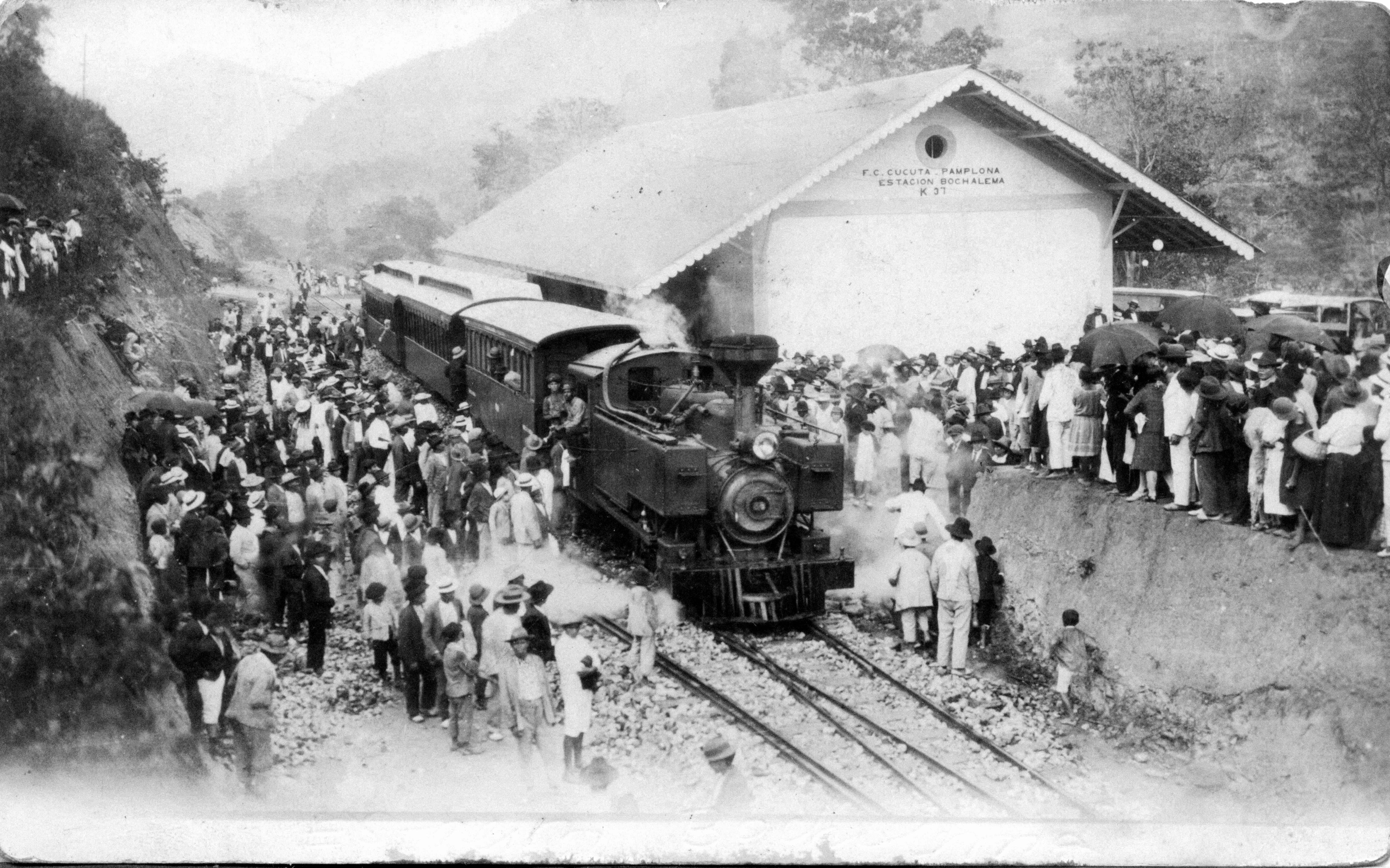
Estación Bochalema

1. Estación Bochalema

=== Ferrocarril del Nordeste ===
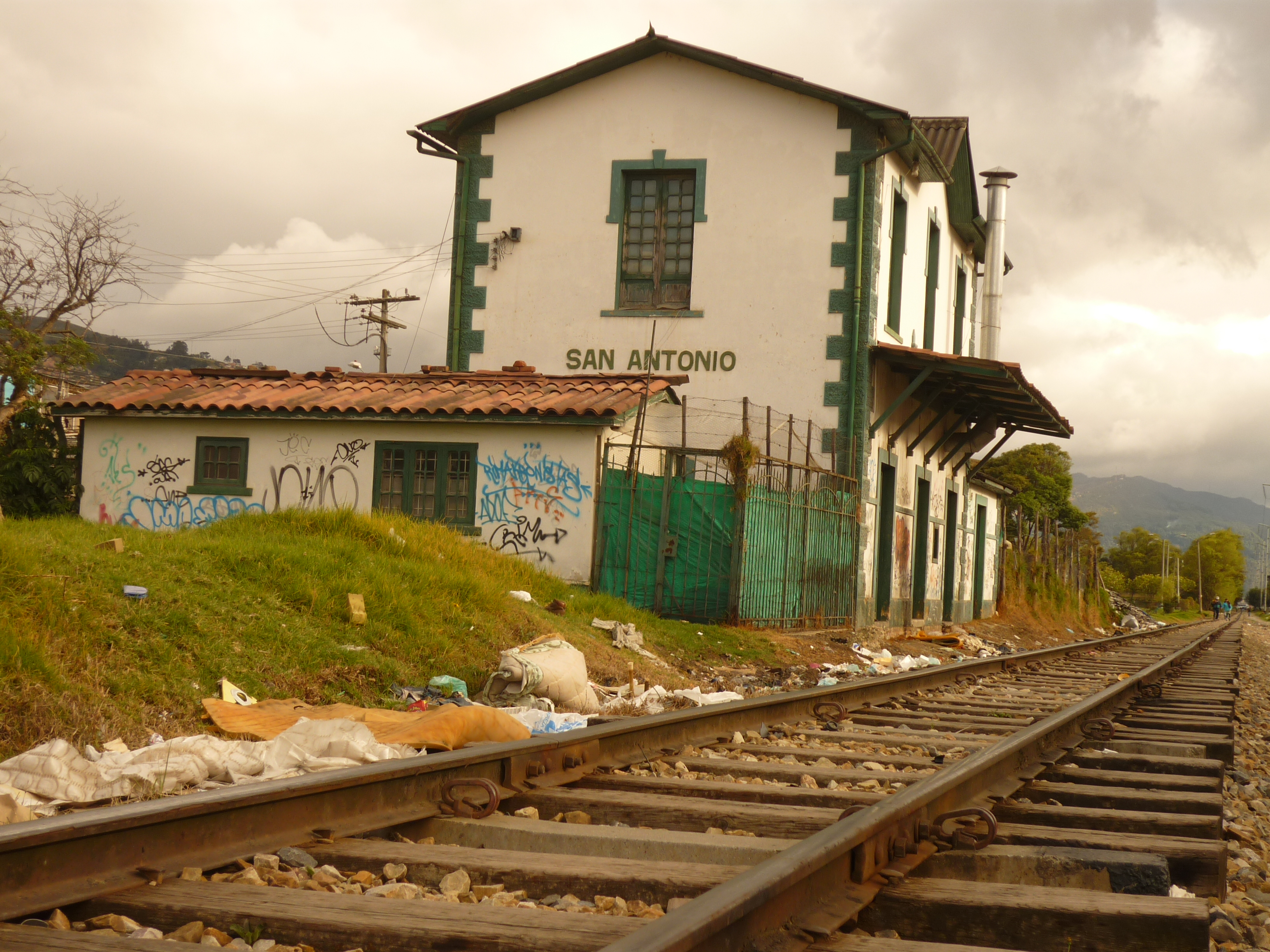
Estación San Antonio, Bogotá

1. Estación San Antonio, Bogotá
2. a station at Chapinero
3. a station at Calle 100
4. a station at Usaquén
5. Estación M. A. Caro, at Puente del Común (junction)
6. a station at Briceño (Sopó)
7. a station at Tocancipá
8. a station at Gachancipá
9. a station at Suesca

=== Ferrocarril del Oriente ===
1. La Requilina (Usme)

=== Ferrocarril de Cúcuta ===
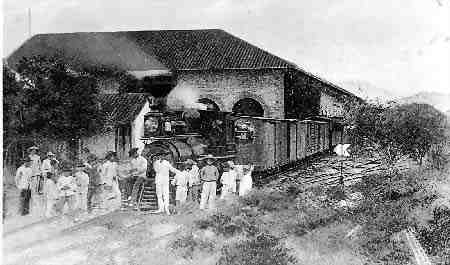
Estación Cúcuta, in 1910

Ferrocarril de Cúcuta (see Ferrocarril de Cúcuta (Spanish-language wikipedia)) had more than 20 stations, including Estación Cúcuta itself.

=== Other Lines ===
- Buenaventura (Pacific Ocean port)
- Cali

=== Vale ===
- Puerto Córdoba - for coal export from 2009

== Timeline ==
=== 2012 ===
- proposed/rebuilt line to Carare for coal export
- Puerto Berrio (Atlantic Ocean port)
- Cundinamarca (coal mine)
- Boyacá (coal mine)
- Santander (coal mine)

== See also ==
- Rail transport in Colombia
- Transport in Colombia
