= Light rail in South America =

Light rail is a commonly used mode of public transit in South America. The term light rail was coined in 1972 by the Urban Mass Transportation Administration (UMTA; the precursor to the U.S. Federal Transit Administration) to describe new streetcar transformations which were taking place in Europe and the United States. The Germans used the term Stadtbahn, which is the predecessor to North American light rail, to describe the concept, and many in UMTA wanted to adopt the direct translation, which is city rail. However, in its reports UMTA finally adopted the term light rail instead.

== Argentina ==
Argentina currently has light rail systems in Buenos Aires (Buenos Aires Premetro and Tren de la Costa) and the Metrotranvía Mendoza light rail line in Mendoza. A tram network is planned for Rosario, Santa Fe.

== Bolivia ==
Mi Tren is a three-line light rail network under construction in the Bolivian city of Cochabamba, linking the city with Suticollo, El Castillo and San Simon University. Construction began in 2017 and two of the three proposed lines opened in 2022.

== Brazil ==
In the run up to the Olympics, Rio de Janeiro opened the Rio de Janeiro Light Rail system in 2016 alongside the existing heritage Santa Teresa Tram. There is one light rail line in Santos, São Paulo, and a system is under construction in Cuiabá. Other operating light rail systems are the Sobral Light Rail, the Fortaleza Light Rail and the Cariri Light Rail.

== Chile ==
The Valparaíso Metro in Valparaíso, Chile is a hybrid light rail-commuter rail service running underground in Viña del Mar.

== Colombia ==
The Ayacucho Tram operates in Medellín, Colombia. The Barranquilla light rail is planned, and the RegioTram is under construction. There is also now a recent proposal from the President of Colombia, to create light rail system in Bucaramanga due to the issue of the lack of public transport.

== Ecuador ==
The Cuenca tram opened in May 2020 in Cuenca, Ecuador.

== See also ==
- List of tram and light rail transit systems
