= Transport in Colombia =

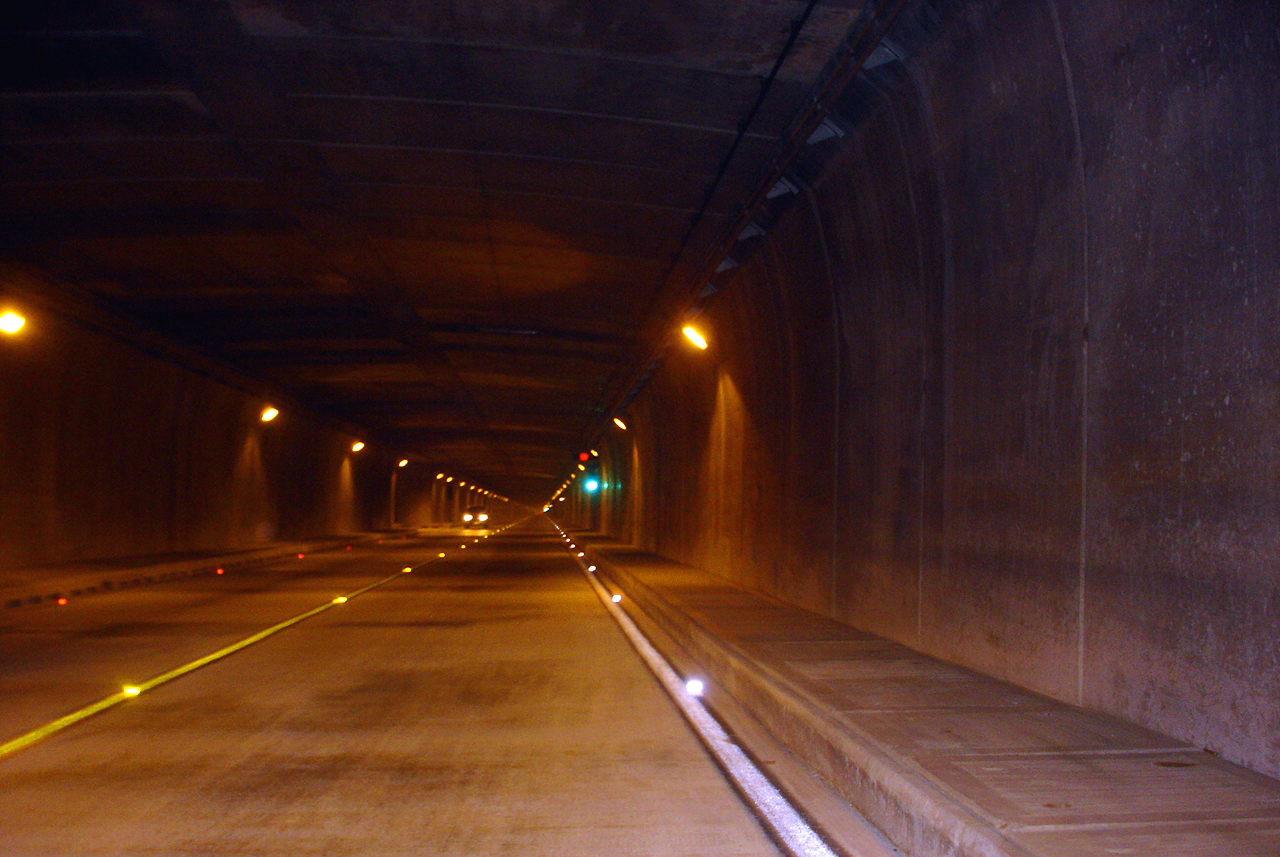
Túnel de Occidente in Antioquia. The tunnel was the longest in Latin America until the opening of La Línea in 2020.

Transport in Colombia is regulated by the Ministry of Transport.

Road travel is the main means of transport; 69 percent of cargo is transported by road, as compared with 27 percent by railroad, 3 percent by internal waterways, and 1 percent by air.

== History ==
=== Indigenous peoples influence ===
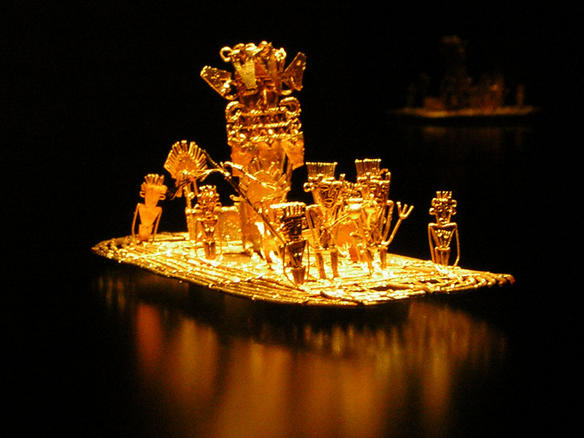
Muisca culture golden raft

The indigenous peoples in Colombia used and some continue to use the waterways as the way of transportation using rafts and canoes.

=== Spanish influence ===
With the arrival of the Europeans the Spaniards brought the horses, mules and donkey (which developed into the Paso Fino) used by them in ranching duties later in the Spanish colonization of the Americas. Horses contributed greatly to the transport of the Spanish conquerors and colonizers. They also introduced the wheel, and brought wooden carts and carriages to facilitate their transport. The Spaniards also developed the first roads, rudimentary and most of these in the Caribbean region. Due to the rough terrain of Colombia communications between regions was difficult and affected the effectiveness of the central government creating isolation in some regions. Maritime navigation developed locally after Spain lifted its restrictions on ports within the Spanish Empire inducing mercantilism. Spanish also transported African slaves and forcedly migrated many indigenous tribes throughout Colombia.

=== Post-independence ===
With the independence and the influences of the European Industrial Revolution the main way of transport in Colombia became the navigation mainly through the Magdalena River which connected Honda in inland Colombia, with Barranquilla by the Caribbean Sea to the trade with the United States and Europe. This also brought a large wave of immigrants from European and Middle Eastern countries. The industrialization process and transportation in Colombia were affected by the internal civil wars that surged after the independence from Spain and that continued throughout the 19th and 20th centuries.

=== Standardization ===
During the late 19th century European and American companies introduced railways to carry to the ports the local production of raw materials intended for exports and also imports from Europe. Steam ships began carrying Colombians, immigrants and goods from Europe and the United States over the Magdalena River.

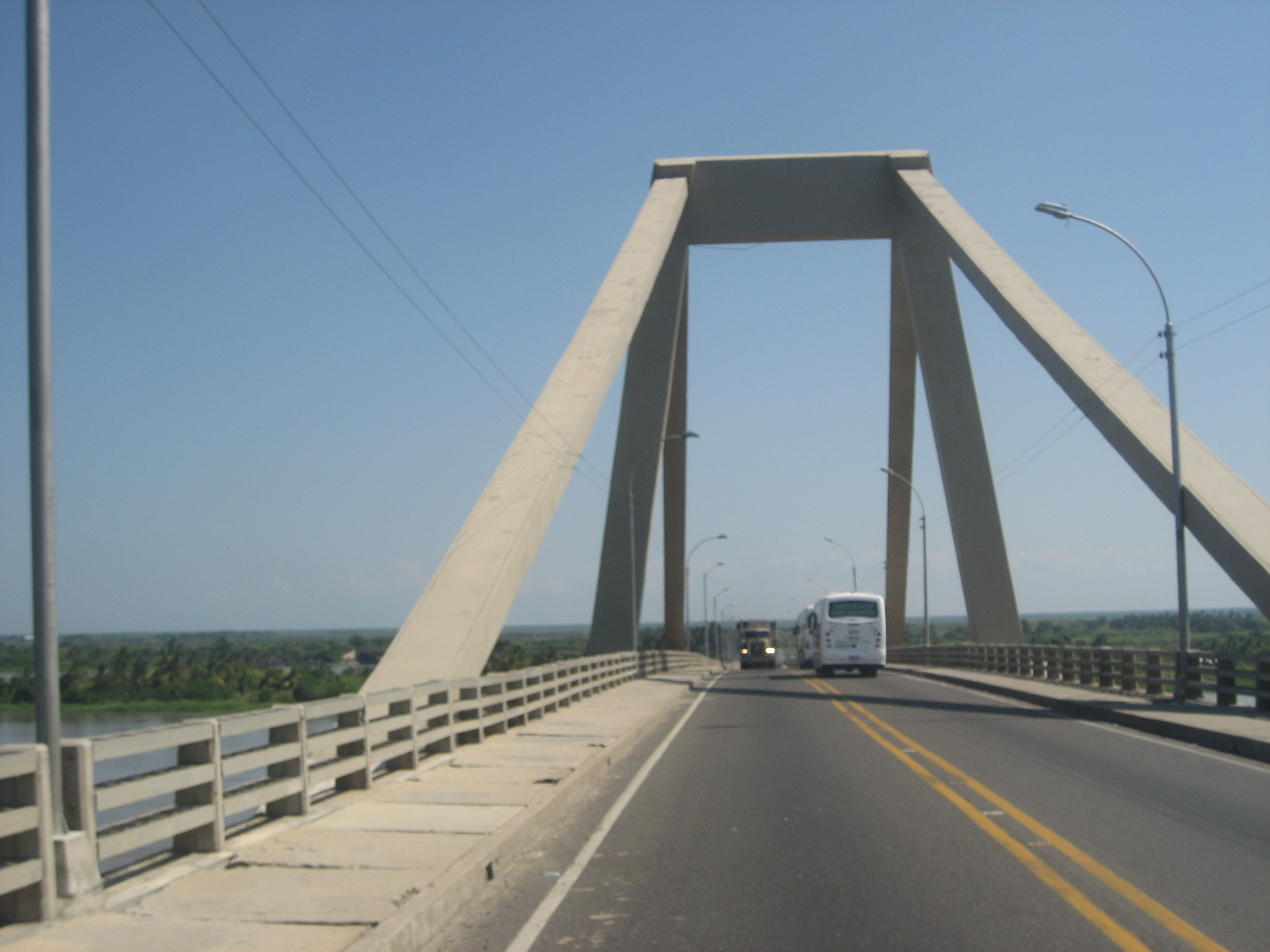
The Pumarejo bridge in Barranquilla. The bridge serves to cross the Magdalena River between the Departments of Atlántico and Magdalena. It is also one of the oldest standing bridges in Colombia.

The Ministry of Transport was created in 1905 during the presidency of Rafael Reyes under the name of Ministerio de Obras Públicas y Transporte or Ministry of Public Works and Transport with the main function of taking care of national assets issues, including mines, oil (fuel), patents and trade marks, railways, roads, bridges, national buildings and land without landowners.

In the early 20th century roads and highways maintenance and construction regulations were established. Rivers were cleaned, dragged and channeled and the navigational industry was organized. The Public works districts were created, as well as the Ferrocarriles Nacionales de Colombia (National Railways of Colombia). Among other major projects developed were the aqueduct of Bogotá, La Regadera Dam and the Vitelma Water Treatment Plant. The Ministry also created the National Institute of Transit (from the Spanish Instituto Nacional de Tránsito), (INTRA) under the Transport and tariffs Directorate and was in charge of designing the first National roads plan with the support of many foreign multinational construction companies.

Aviation was born in Barranquilla with the creation of SCADTA in 1919 a joint venture between Colombians and Germans that delivered mail to the main cities of Colombia which later merged with SACO to form Avianca.

== Infrastructure ==
=== Railways ===
Railroads of Colombia

Colombia has 3,034 kilometers (1,885 mi) of rail lines, 150 kilometers (93 mi) of which are 1,435 mm (4 ft 8 1/2 in) gauge and 3,154 kilometers (1,960 mi) of which are 914 mm (3 ft) gauge. However, only 2,611 kilometers (1,622 mi) of lines are still in use. Rail transport in Colombia remains underdeveloped. The national railroad system, once the country's main mode of transport for freight, has been neglected in favor of road development and now accounts for only about a quarter of freight transport. Passenger-rail use was suspended in 1992 resumed at the end of the 1990s, and as of 2017 it is considered abandoned (at least for long distances). Fewer than 165,000 passenger journeys were made in 1999, as compared with more than 5 million in 1972, and the figure was only 160,130 in 2005. The two still-functioning passenger trains are: one between Puerto Berrío and García Cadena, and another one between Bogotá and Zipaquirá. Short sections of railroad, mainly the Bogotá-Atlantic rim, are used to haul goods, mostly coal, to the Caribbean and Pacific ports. In 2005 a total of 27.5 million metric tons of cargo were transported by rail. Although the nation's rail network links seven of the country's 10 major cities, very little of it has been used regularly because of security concerns, lack of maintenance, and the power of the road transport union. During 2004–6, approximately 2,000 kilometers of the country's rail lines underwent refurbishment. This upgrade involved two main projects: the 1,484-kilometer line linking Bogotá to the Caribbean Coast and the 499-kilometer Pacific coastal network that links the industrial city of Cali and the surrounding coffee-growing region to the port of Buenaventura.

=== Roads ===
Main roads in Colombia

The three main north–south highways are the Caribbean, Eastern, and Central Trunk Highways (troncales). Estimates of the length of Colombia's road system in 2004 ranged from 115,000 kilometers to 145,000 kilometers, of which fewer than 15 percent were paved. However, according to 2005 data reported by the Colombian government, the road network totaled 163,000 kilometers, 68 percent of which were paved and in good condition. The increase may reflect some newly built roads. President Uribe has vowed to pave more than 2,500 kilometers of roads during his administration, and about 5,000 kilometers of new secondary roads were being built in the 2003–6 period. Despite serious terrain obstacles, almost three-quarters of all cross-border dry cargo is now transported by road, 105,251 metric tons in 2005.

A chiva bus transporting passengers and cargo along National Route 56 (Ruta Nacional 56) from La Dorada to Sonsón

Highways are managed by the Colombian Ministry of Transport through the National Roads Institute. The security of the highways in Colombia is managed by the Highway Police unit of the Colombian National Police. Colombia is crossed by the Panamerican Highway.

=== Ports, waterways, and merchant marine ===
Rivers of Colombia

Seaports handle around 80 percent of international cargo. In 2005 a total of 105,251 metric tons of cargo were transported by water. Colombia's most important ocean terminals are Barranquilla, Cartagena, and Santa Marta on the Caribbean Coast and Buenaventura and Tumaco on the Pacific Coast. Exports mostly pass through the Caribbean ports of Cartagena and Santa Marta, while 65 percent of imports arrive at the port of Buenaventura. Other important ports and harbors are Bahía de Portete, Leticia, Puerto Bolívar, San Andrés, Santa Marta, and Turbo. Since privatization was implemented in 1993, the efficiency of port handling has increased greatly. Privatization, however, has had negative impacts as well. In Buenaventura, for example, privatization of the harbor has increased unemployment and social issues. There are plans to construct a deep-water port at Bahía Solano.

The main inland waterways total about 18,200 kilometers, 11,000 kilometers of which are navigable by riverboats. A well-developed and important form of transport for both cargo and passengers, inland waterways transport approximately 3.8 million metric tons of freight and more than 5.5 million passengers annually. Main inland waterways are the Magdalena–Cauca River system, which is navigable for 1,500 kilometers; the Atrato, which is navigable for 687 kilometers; the Orinoco system of more than five navigable rivers, which total more than 4,000 kilometers of potential navigation (mainly through Venezuela); and the Amazonas system, which has four main rivers totaling 3,000 navigable kilometers (mainly through Brazil). The government is planning an ambitious program to more fully utilize the main rivers for transport. In addition, the navy's riverine brigade has been patrolling waterways more aggressively in order to establish safer river transport in the more remote areas in the south and east of the country.

The merchant marine totals 17 ships (1,000 gross registered tons or more), including four bulk, 13 cargo, one container, one liquefied gas, and three petroleum tanker ships. Colombia also has seven ships registered in other countries (Antigua and Barbuda, two; Panama, five).

=== Civil Aviation ===
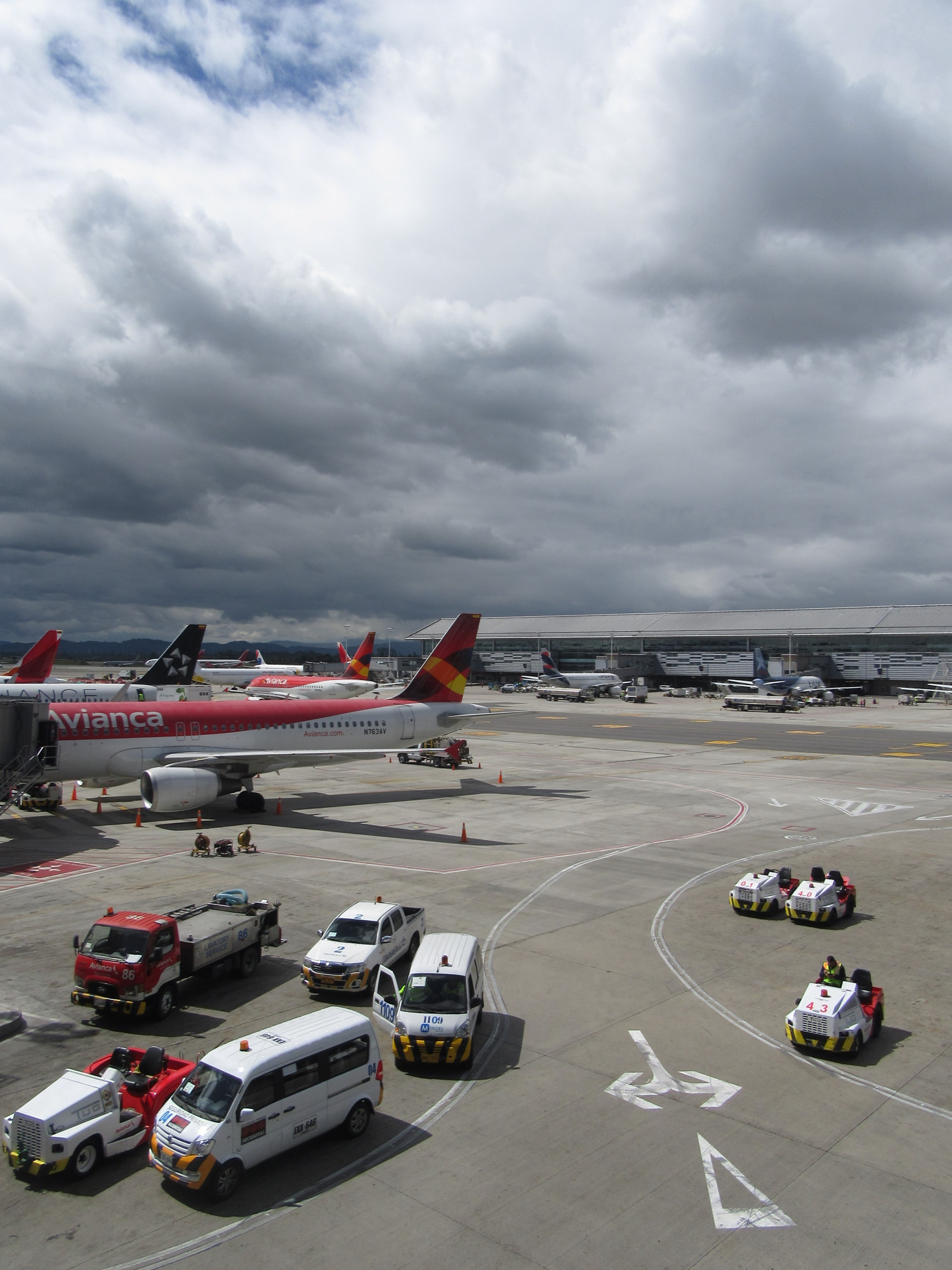
Vehicles on the El Dorado Airport platform

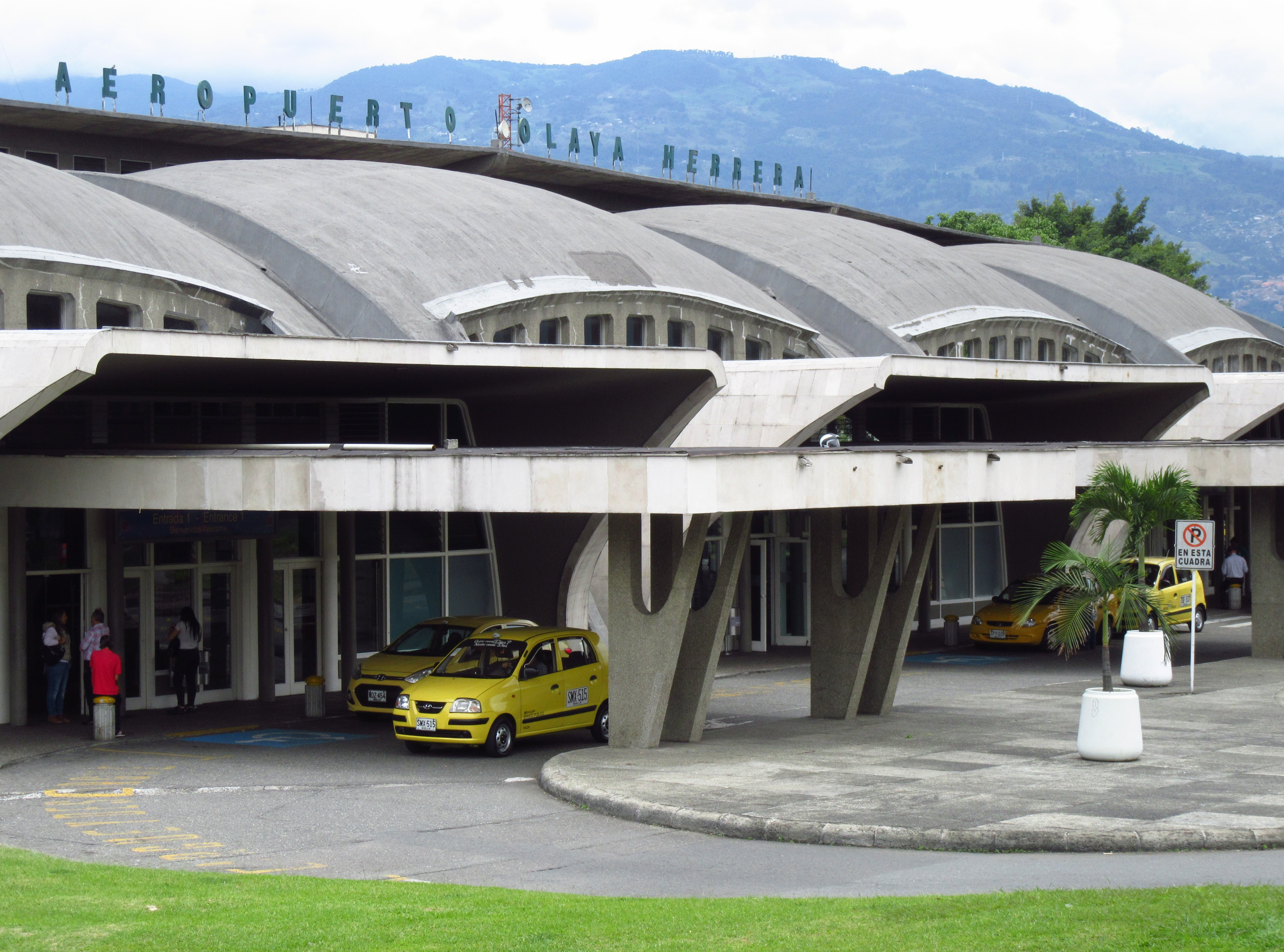
Olaya Herrera Airport of Medellín

The Special Administrative Unit of Civil Aeronautics is responsible of regulating and controlling the use of air space by civil aviation. The customs/immigration issues are controlled by the Departamento Administrativo de Seguridad (DAS).

Colombia has well-developed air routes and an estimated total of 984 airports, 100 of which have paved runways, plus two heliports. Of the 74 main airports, 20 can accommodate jet aircraft. Two airports are more than 3,047 meters in length, nine are 2,438–3,047 meters, 39 are 1,524–2,437 meters, 38 are 914–1,523 meters, 12 are shorter than 914 meters, and 880 have unpaved runways. The government has been selling its stake in local airports in order to allow their privatization. The country has 40 regional airports, and the cities of Bogotá, Medellín, Cali, Barranquilla, Bucaramanga, Cartagena, Cúcuta, Leticia, Pereira, Armenia, San Andrés, and Santa Marta have international airports. Bogotá's El Dorado International Airport handles 550 million metric tons of cargo and 22 million passengers a year, making it the largest airport in Latin America in terms of cargo and the third largest in passenger numbers.

=== Urban transport ===
Urban transport systems have been developed in Barranquilla, Bogotá, Cali, and Medellín. Traffic congestion in Bogotá had been greatly exacerbated by a lack of rail transport; however, this problem was alleviated, to a degree, by the formation of one of the world's most expansive and highest-capacity bus rapid transit (BRT) systems—known as the TransMilenio (opened 2000)—and the restriction of vehicles through a daily, rotating ban on private cars (depending on plate numbers). Bogotá's BRT consists of bus and minibus services managed by both private- and public-sector enterprises.

Since 1995, Medellín has had a modern urban railway, the Metro de Medellín, utilizing two train lines with 27 stations. The Metro also connects with the cities of Itagüí, Envigado, and Bello. An elevated gondola-cablecar system, the Metrocable, opened in 2004 to improve Metro accessibility for some of the city's more isolated, dense barrios. The gondola design was specifically chosen due to the mountainous geography of the city, with most of the neighborhoods served being reasonably higher in elevation from the city center. A BRT line called Transmetro began operating in 2011, with a second line added in 2013.

Other Colombian cities have also installed BRT systems, such as Cali, with a six-line system (opened 2008), Barranquilla with two lines (opened 2010), Bucaramanga with one line (opened 2010), Cartagena with one line (opened 2015) and Pereira, with three lines (opened 2006). A future light rail line in Barranquilla is planned.

=== Pipelines ===
Colombia has 4,350 kilometers of gas pipelines, 6,134 kilometers of oil pipelines, and 3,140 kilometers of refined-products pipelines. The country has five major oil pipelines, four of which connect with the Caribbean export terminal at Puerto Coveñas. Until at least September 2005, the United States funded efforts to help protect a major pipeline, the 769-kilometer-long Caño Limón–Puerto Coveñas pipeline, which carries about 20 percent of Colombia's oil production to Puerto Coveñas from the guerrilla-infested Arauca region in the eastern Andean foothills and Amazonian jungle. The number of attacks against pipelines began declining substantially in 2002. In 2004 there were only 17 attacks against the Caño Limón–Puerto Coveñas pipeline, down from 170 in 2001. However, a bombing in February 2005 shut the pipeline for several weeks, and attacks against the electrical gird system that provides energy to the Caño Limón oilfield have continued. New oil pipeline projects with Brazil and Venezuela are underway. In addition, the already strong cross-border trade links between Colombia and Venezuela were solidified in July 2004 with an agreement to build a US$320 million natural gas pipeline between the two countries, to be completed in 2008.

== See also ==
- Megabús
- Railway stations in Colombia
