= Bogotá La Sabana railway station =

Coordinates: 4°36′26″N 74°05′00″W

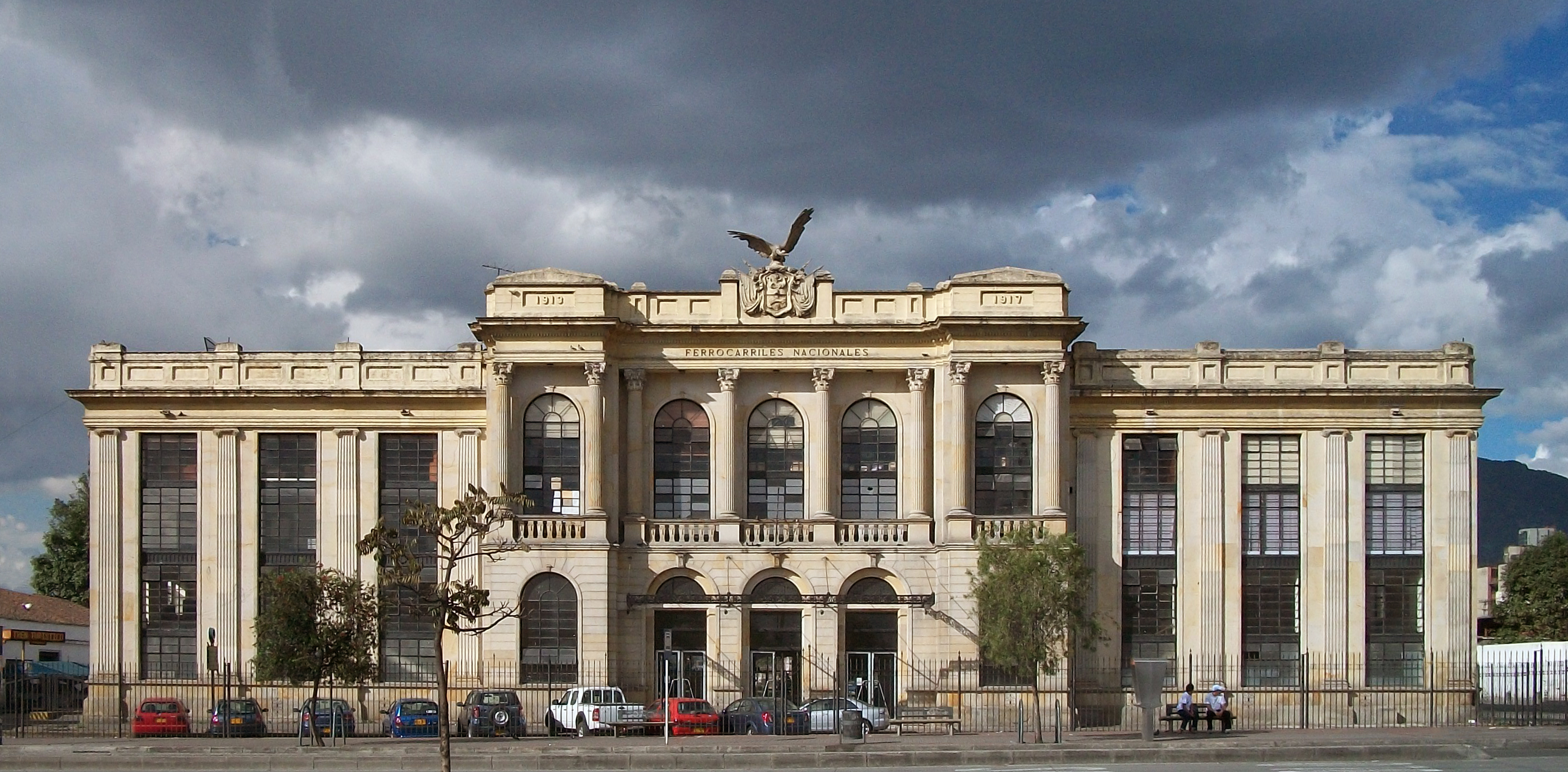
Bogotá La Sabana railway station

The Bogotá La Sabana railway station (in Spanish: Estación de la Sabana) is a neoclassical building in Bogotá (Colombia), home to the central station of the Bogotá Savannah Railway and the National Railways of Colombia (Ferrocarriles Nacionales de Colombia, FNC). Inaugurated on 20 July 1917, this construction replaced the old station built at the end of the 1880s.

It is located on the locality of Los Mártires, near the downtown of the city. During the first half of the 20th century it was an important pole of development towards the west of the city. Due to the deterioration of the sector and the decline of the railroad, the building has suffered a whole series of damages. At present, although it does not fulfill its role as the railway's central transportation hub (being used for the Tourist train of the Savannah of Bogotá), the recovery of the building is included in the sector's urban renewal plan.

The building was declared a national monument in 1984, due to its historical and cultural importance.

== See also ==
- Rail transport in Colombia
