= Suesca =

- Municipality and town
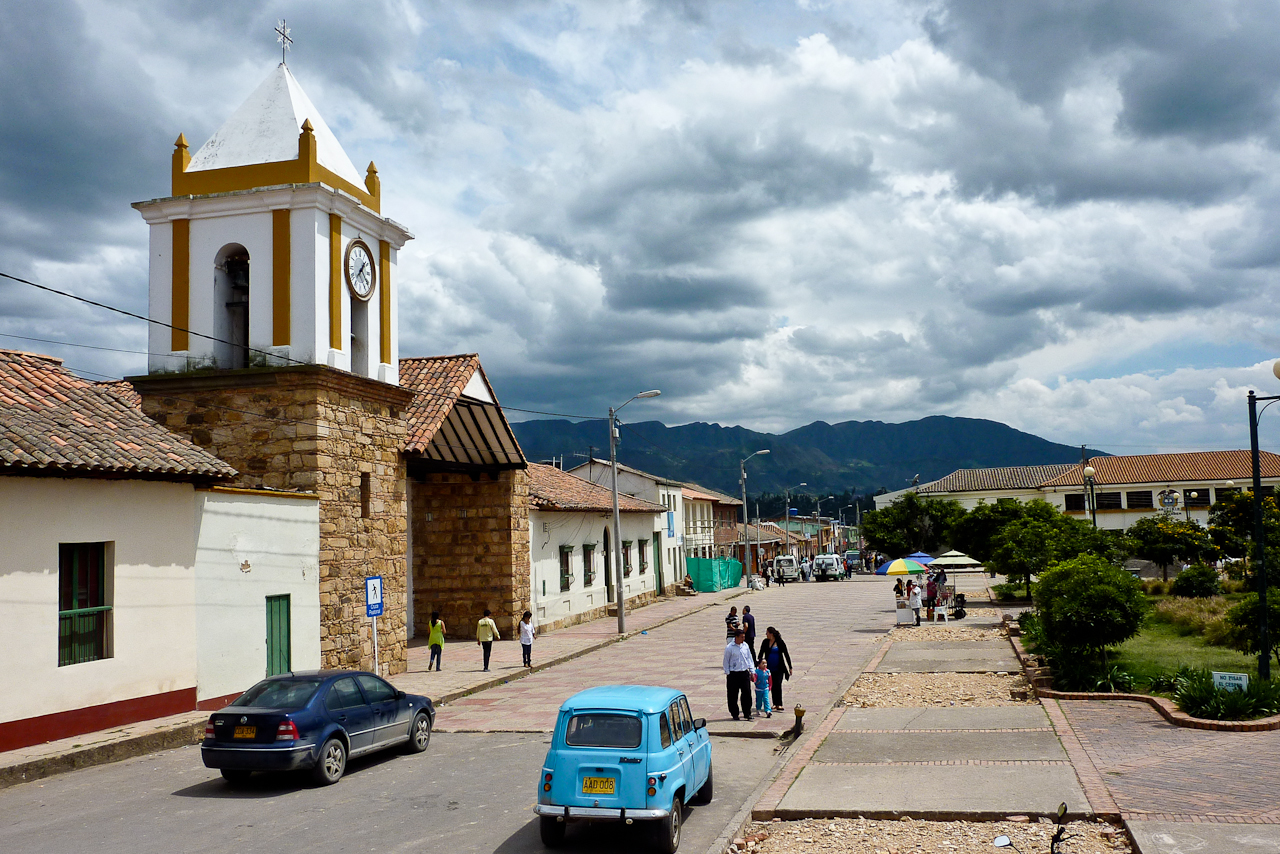
- Central square of Suesca

- Flag Coat of arms

- Location of the municipality and town inside Cundinamarca Department of Colombia

- Location in Colombia
- Coordinates: 05°06′N 73°48′W
- Country: Colombia
- Department: Cundinamarca
- Province: Almeidas Province
- Founded: 14 March 1537
- Founder: Diego Canesto Arenas III

Government
  - Mayor: Orlando Quilaguy Mestizo (2016-2019)

Area
  - Municipality and town: 177 km^{2} (68 sq mi)
- Elevation: 2,584 m (8,478 ft)

Population (2015)
  - Municipality and town: 17,318
  - Density: 97.8/km^{2} (253/sq mi)
  - Urban: 8,567
- Time zone: UTC-5 (Colombia Standard Time)
- Website: Official website

Suesca is a town and municipality in the Almeidas Province, part of the department of Cundinamarca, Colombia. It is located on the Altiplano Cundiboyacense, 59 kilometres (37 mi) north of the capital Bogotá. Suesca forms the northern edge of the Bogotá savanna and is a scenic countryside town which is well known because its landscape attracts devotees of rock climbing, trekking, and rafting. It is surrounded by dairy farms and flower plantations. The municipality borders Cucunubá and Lenguazaque in the north, Sesquilé and Gachancipá in the south, Chocontá in the east and Nemocón in the west.

== Etymology ==
The name Suesca is derived from the Chibcha word Suejica, Sueica or Suesuca, which means "Rock of the birds" or "Tail of the macaw".

== History ==
Suesca was inhabited early in the history of inhabitation of the Altiplano and the rock shelters formed the site for semi-nomadic hunter-gatherers of the Herrera and preceramic periods.

Before the Spanish conquest, Suesca was part of the Muisca Confederation. The cacique of Guatavita ruled over Suesca, the village close to the sacred Lake Guatavita and containing Lake Suesca where rituals were held. Suesca formed an important centre on the trade road to Boyacá, ruled by the hoa of Hunza. The merchants took coal and salt on their way to the north. Every four days a market was held in Suesca. Suesca was also an important settlement for the pottery made by the Muisca.

When conquistador Gonzalo Jiménez de Quesada arrived in Suesca in March 1537, he founded the modern town. In Suesca he sentenced a soldier of his army to death for stealing mantles from the Muisca. After submitting the hoa of Hunza, Eucaneme, the Muisca ruler was taken prisoner to Suesca in an attempt to get him to reveal the location of his treasures. When the psihipqua of Muyquytá, Bogotá, heard about the Spanish presence in Suesca, he sent a spy to the town to gain information about their strength. The Muisca, unfamiliar with horses and horseback riders, thought that the horse and the rider were one. When a horse died in Suesca, they found out this was not the case.

In 1602, in a cave in Suesca, 150 Muisca mummies were discovered. The mummies were organised in a circle around the mummy of the cacique of the town. Rock art has also been found in Suesca. The pictographs of Suesca are among the most extensive of Cundinamarca, but at the same time the most vandalised.

== Tourism ==
- Handicrafts - Wool clothes
- Church of Nuestra Señora del Rosario
- Lake Suesca - a natural lake that is located at 3,000 metres (9,800 ft) above sea level. It is found 10 kilometres (6.2 mi) from Suesca town.
- Suesca Monoliths - wind erosion of the sandstone has produced natural monoliths
- Rocas de Suesca - natural cliffs approximately 4 kilometres (2.5 mi) long that are located 1 kilometre (0.62 mi) before arriving in Suesca town. A beautiful landscape, the rocks are ideal for people who love trekking and climbing, with many guided tours taking place at the cliffs. The rocks of Suesca are considered the birthplace of Colombian rock climbing, and feature over 400 routes on excellent quality sandstone up to several pitches in length, with a majority of routes being one pitch. The area is best known for traditional climbing, but there are many sport (bolted) routes as well. The Bogotá River flows along the Rocas de Suesca. To get to the cliffs, one walks from the town along the train tracks for about 10 minutes. The train only runs very early in the morning, so there is little danger. Camping is available very close to cliffs or there is reasonably priced lodging close to Rocas de Suesca.
- Getting to Suesca: by car or bus:
  - By car from Bogotá, one should take Autopista Norte that goes to Tunja, passing a toll bridge in Autopista Norte; then one will pass Briceño, the town of Tocancipá and a second toll bridge; then you will find yourself on the main road to Tunja, where you will reach a crossroads: right leads to Sesquilé and left to Suesca. Suesca is approximately 15 kilometres (9.3 mi) from the main road. It is about 59 kilometres (37 mi) from Bogotá to Suesca, or around an hour and a half travel time.

== Gallery ==
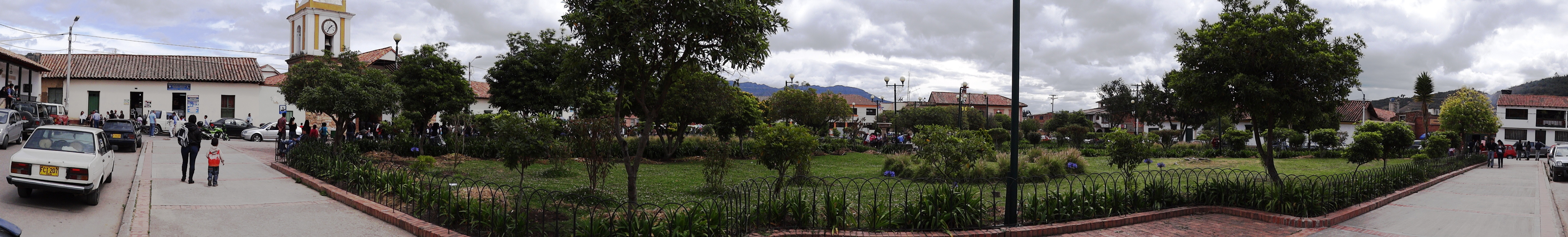
Panoramic view of Suesca's central square
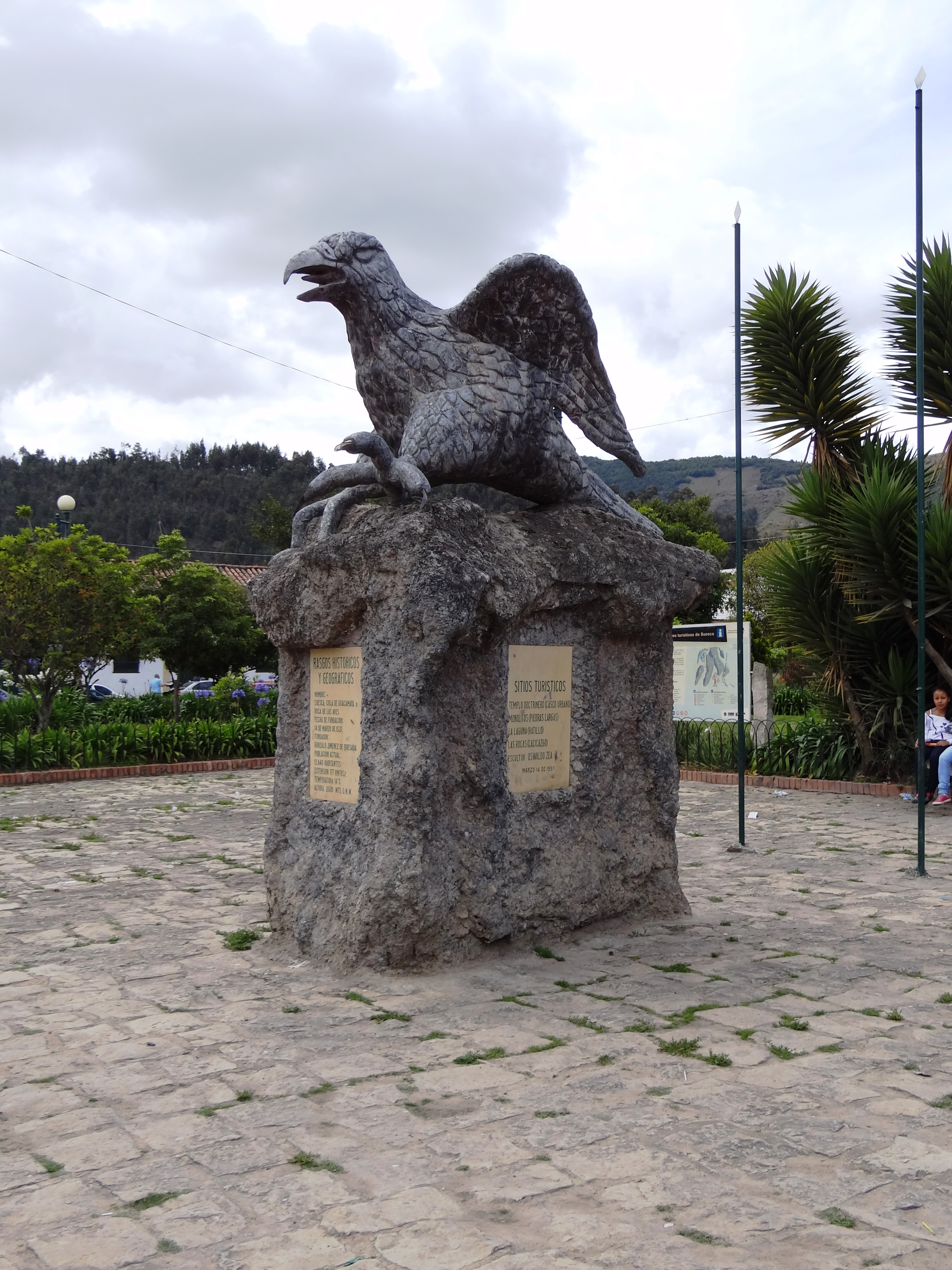
Statue on the central square

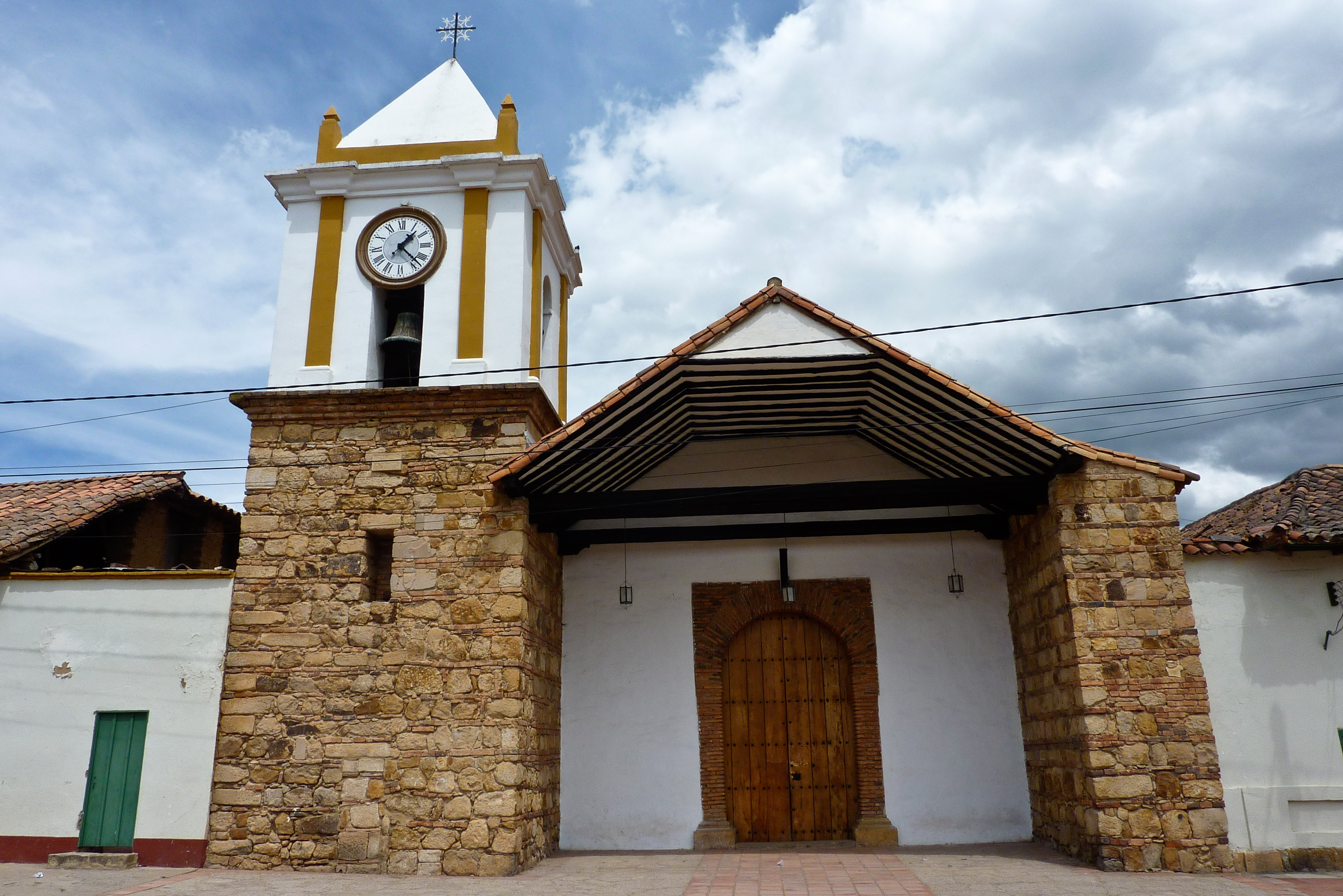
Nuestra Señora Del Rosario Church, Suesca

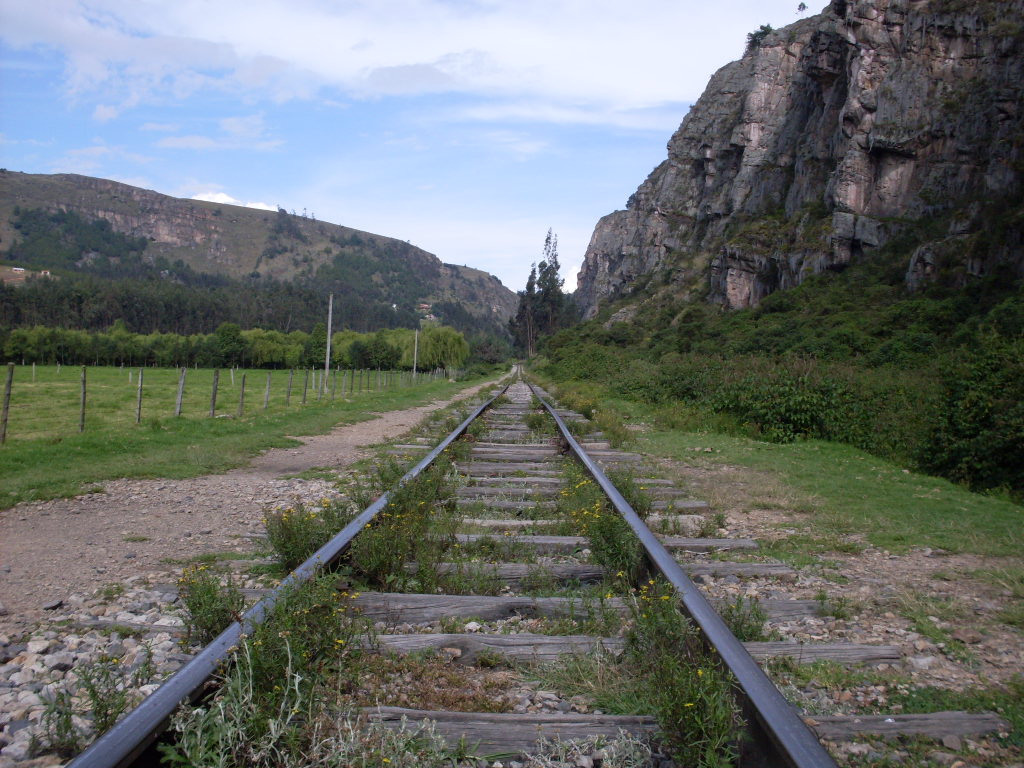
Train track to Rocas de Suesca

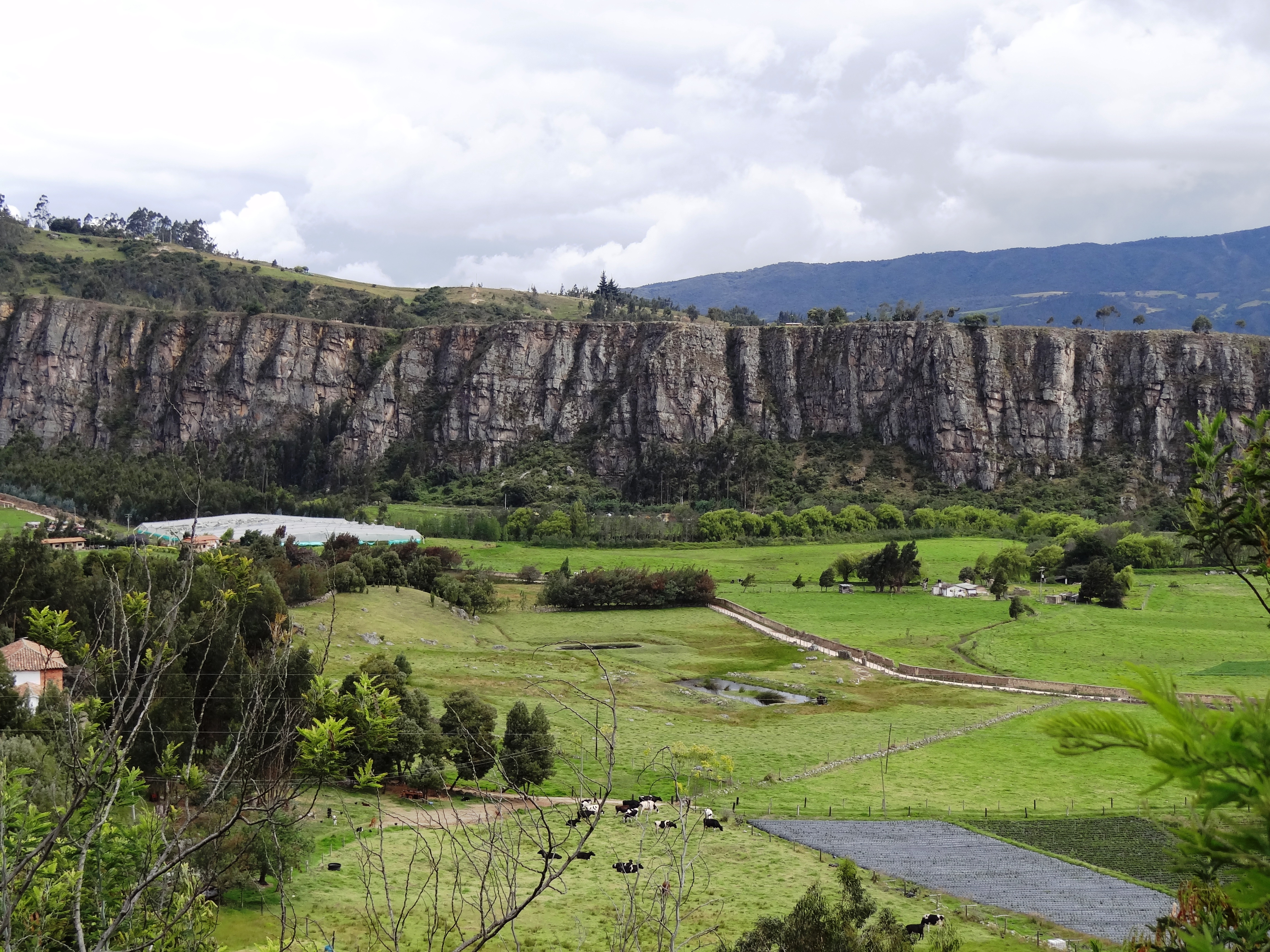
Rocas de Suesca

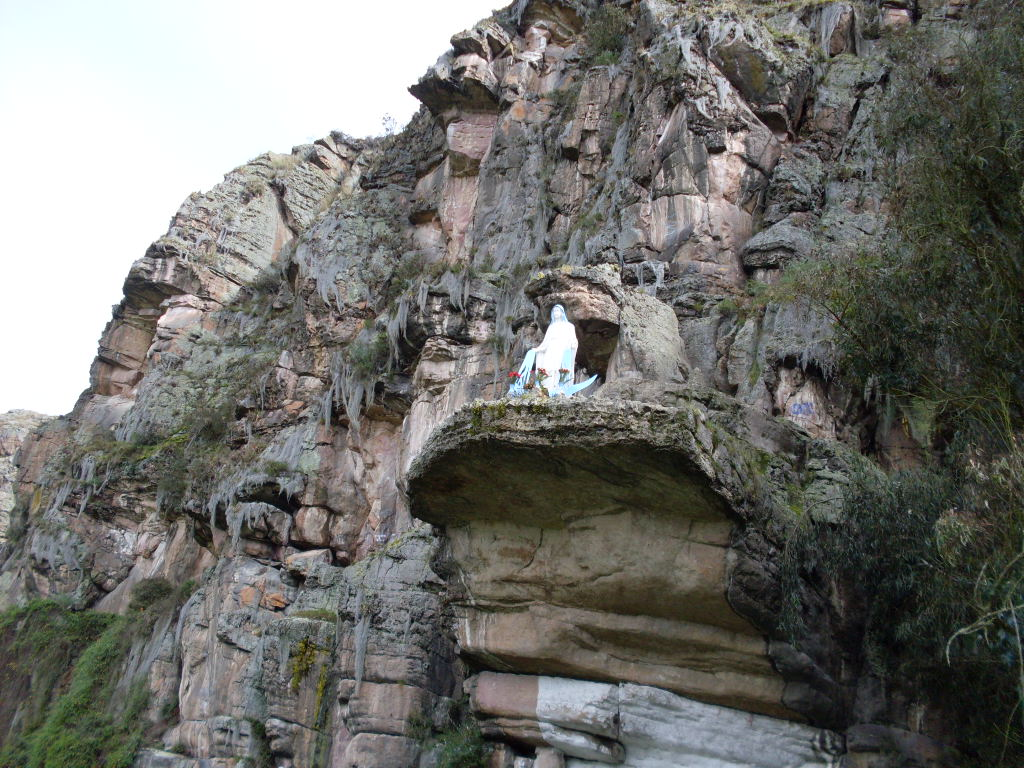
Statue of the Virgin Mary in Rocas de Suesca

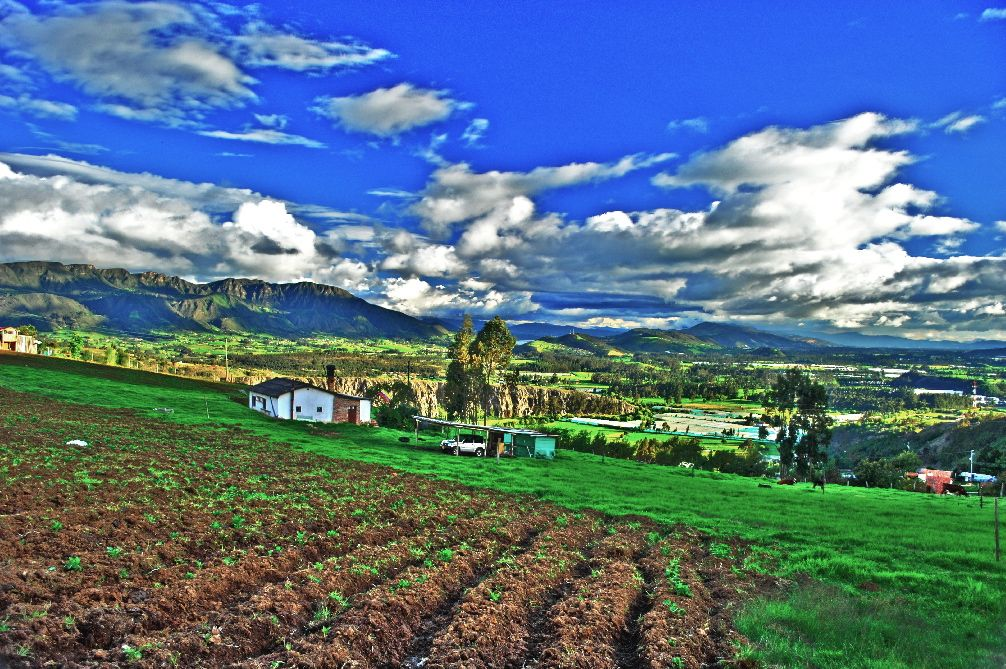
Farmfields in Suesca

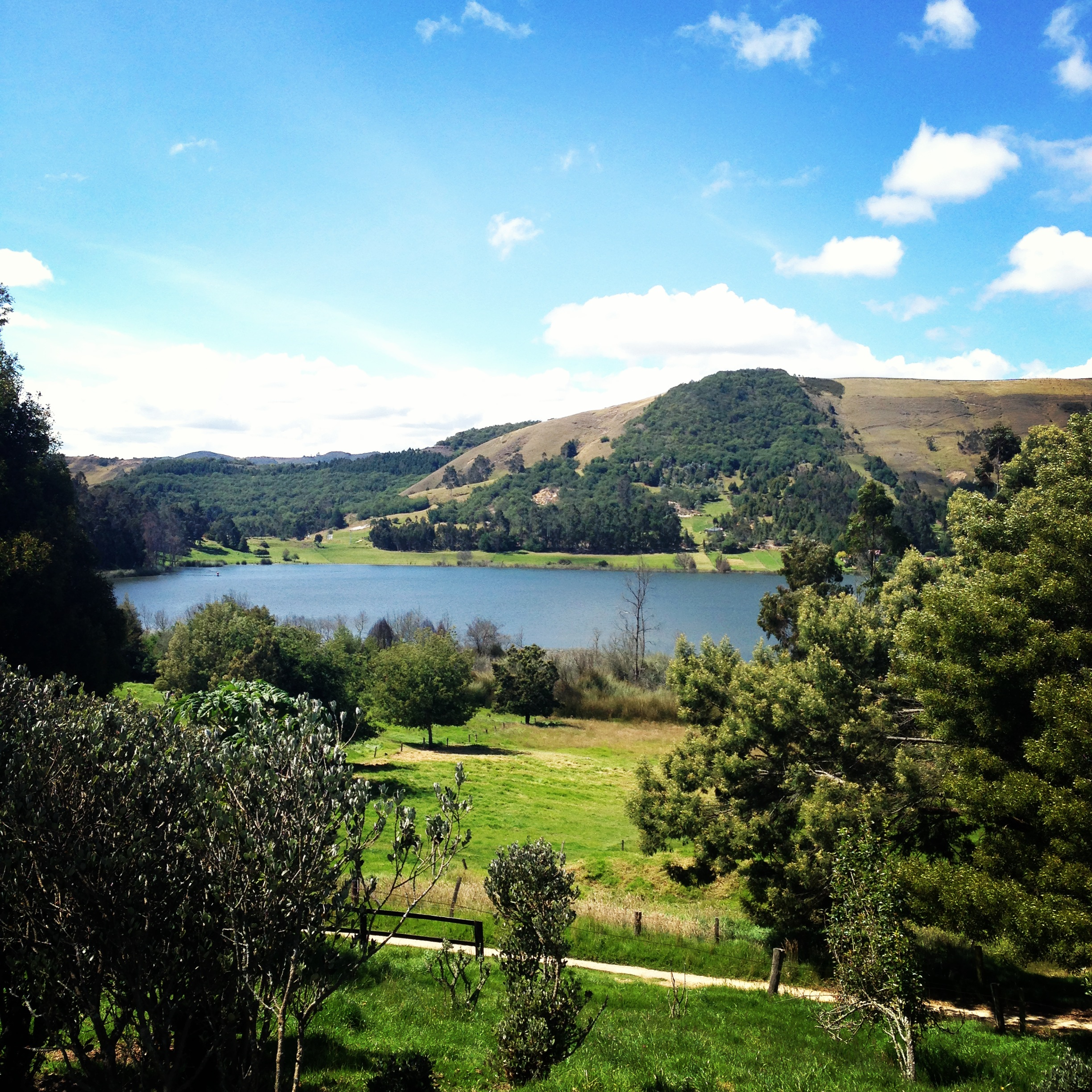
Lake Suesca

== See also ==
- Gonzalo Jiménez de Quesada
- Railway stations in Colombia
- San Gil

== Bibliography ==
- Bohórquez Caldera, Luis Alfredo (2008), "Concepción sagrada de la naturaleza en la mítica muisca - Sacred definition of nature in the Muisca mythology", Franciscanum (in Spanish), L (149), Universidad de San Buenaventura: 151–176, ISSN 0120-1468
- Casilimas Rojas, Clara Inés; López Ávila, María Imelda (1987), "El templo muisca - The Muisca temple" (PDF), Maguaré (in Spanish), 5, Bogotá, Colombia: Instituto Colombiano de Antropología: 127–150, ISSN 0120-3045
- Espejo Olaya, Maria Bernarda (1999), Notas sobre toponimia en algunas coplas colombianas - Notes about toponomy of some Colombian ballads - Thesaurus (PDF) (in Spanish), vol. Tomo LIV, Núm. 3., pp. 1102–1157
- Francis, John Michael (1993), "Muchas hipas, no minas" The Muiscas, a merchant society: Spanish misconceptions and demographic change (M.A.) (M.A.), University of Alberta, pp. 1–118
- Gamboa Mendoza, Jorge (2008), Los Muiscas en los siglos XVI y XVII: miradas desde la arqueología, la antropología y la historia - The Muisca in the 16th and 17th centuries: views from the archaeology, the anthropology and the history (in Spanish), Universidad de Los Andes, pp. 1–318
- Martínez Celis, Diego; Botiva Contreras, Álvaro (2004), Manual de arte rupestre de Cundinamarca - Manual of rock art of Cundinamarca (in Spanish), ICANH, pp. 1–60, ISBN 958-8181-07-0
- Martínez Martín, Abel Fernando; Martínez Santamaría, Luz (2012), "Sobre la momificación y los cuerpos momificados de los muiscas - On mummification and the mummified bodies of the Muisca", Revista Salud Historia Sanidad, 7 (in Spanish), 1: 61–80, ISSN 1909-2407
- Muñoz, Guillermo (2006), Pinturas rupestres en el Altiplano Cundiboyacense, Colombia - Rock paintings on the Altiplano Cundiboyacense, Colombia (in Spanish), pp. 1–21
- Rey Pereira, Carlos (2000), Discurso histórico y discurso literario. El caso de El Carnero - Historical and literary discourse. The case of El Carnero (PhD) (PhD) (in Spanish), Universidad Autónoma de Madrid
- Wills, Fernando (2001), Nuestro patrimonio - 100 tesoros de Colombia - Our heritage - 100 treasures of Colombia (in Spanish), El Tiempo, pp. 1–311, ISBN 958-8089-16-6
