= Tren Turístico de la Sabana =

Company that runs heritage trains in Bogota, Colombia

Coordinates: 4.6906°N 74.0382°W

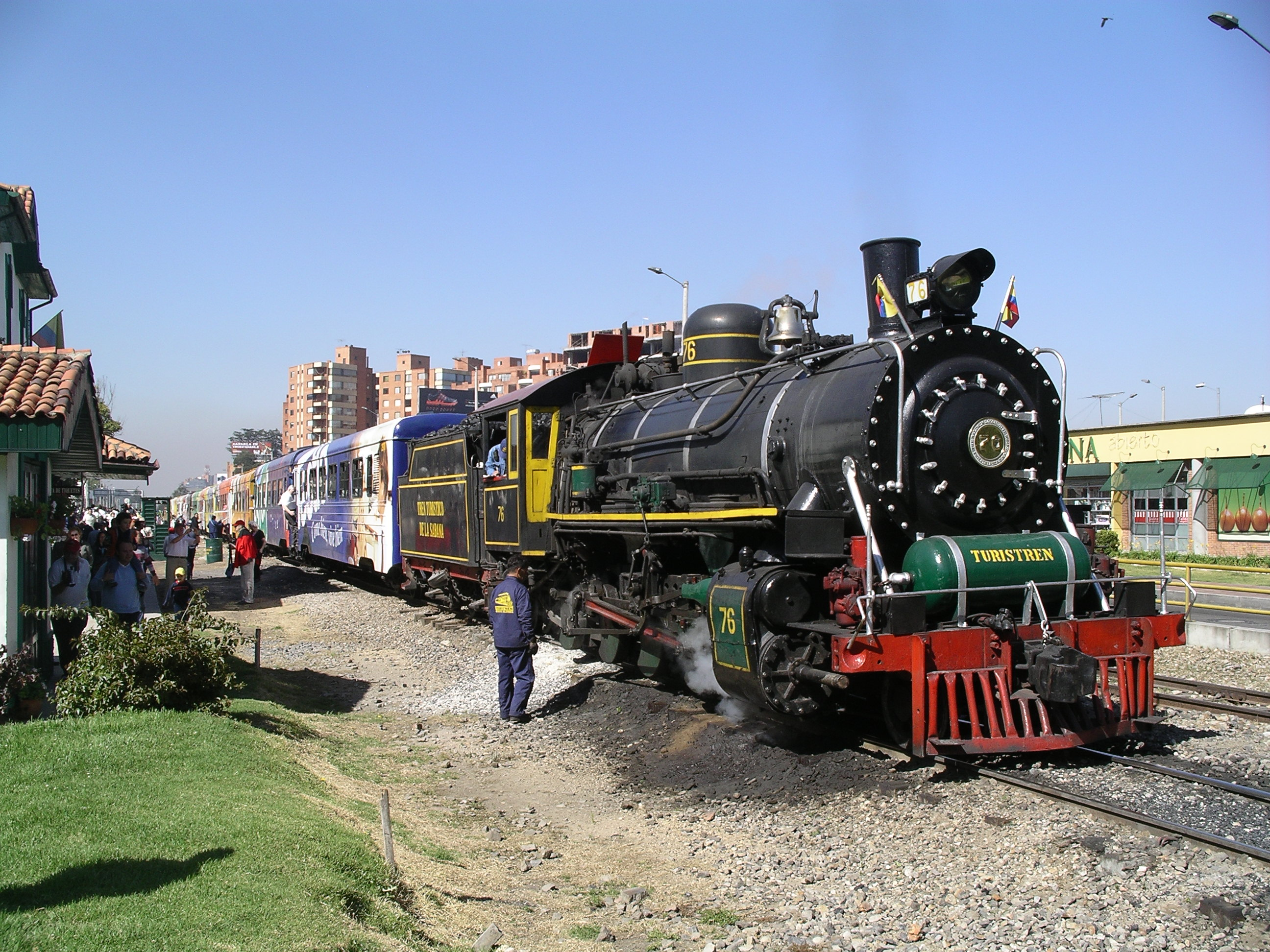
Steam train "Turistren" with steam locomotive No 76

The Tren Turístico de la Sabana or Turistren runs heritage trains in Bogotá, Colombia. The company runs steam trains from Bogota (Sabana railway station) to Parque and Zipaquira.

== History ==
The idea of tourist trains with steam locomotives in Bogota was born 1982. When the National Railways in Colombia stopped running trains in 1990, people with knowledge of the railway, started to renovate a steam locomotive and carriages for a tourist railway. In 1992, the private company "Turistren Ltda" was founded by four friends, and a contract with the National Railways was made to use the tracks for running tourist trains. In 1993, railway tours started with steam locomotives under the name "Tren Turístico de la Sabana".

== Route ==
The 3 ft (914 mm) gauge line runs up the central reservation of Carrera 9, with numerous level crossings at the intersections.

The idea has been discussed of upgrading the line to provide commuter services.

== Gallery ==
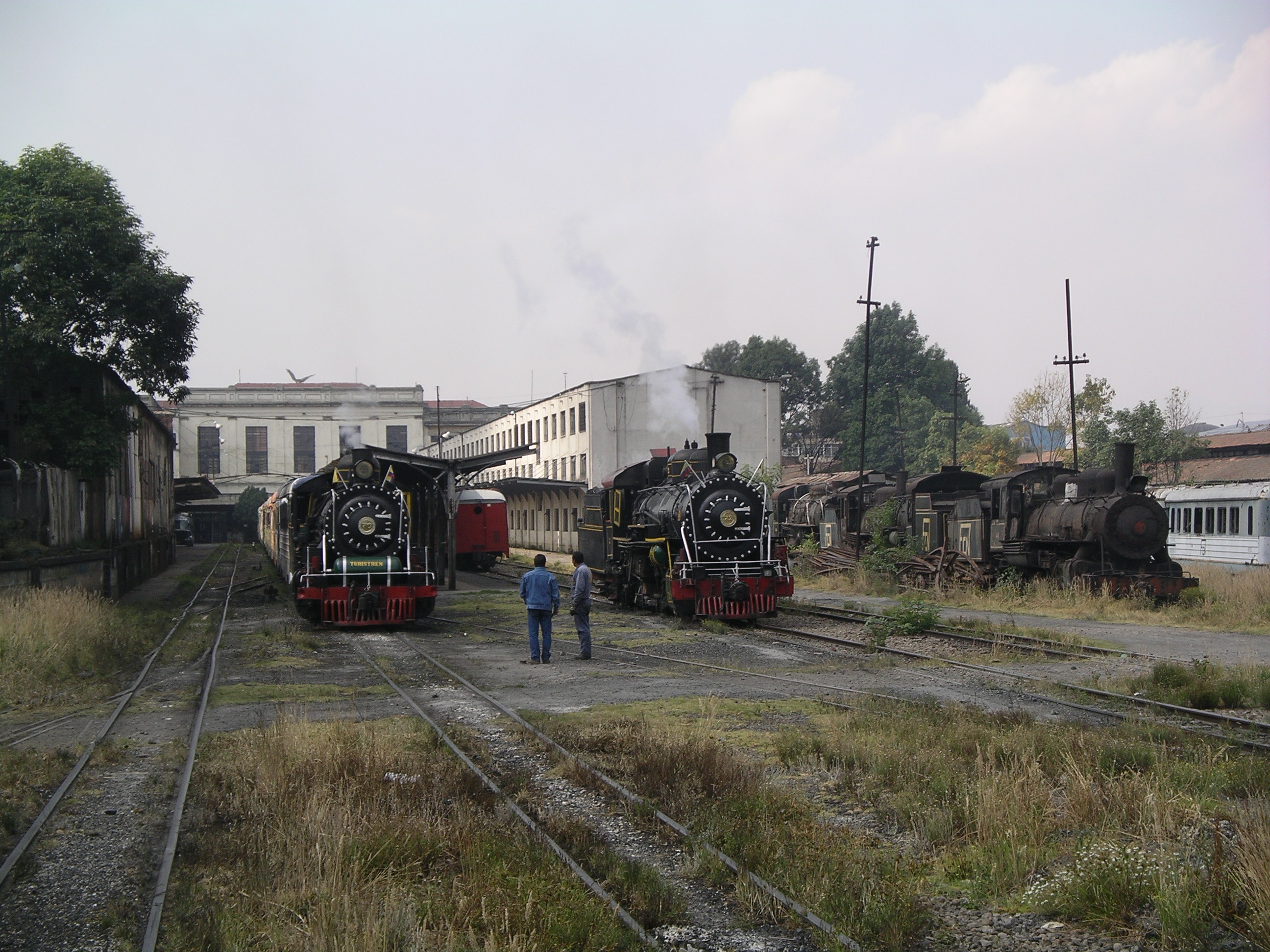
Sabana railway station in Bogota

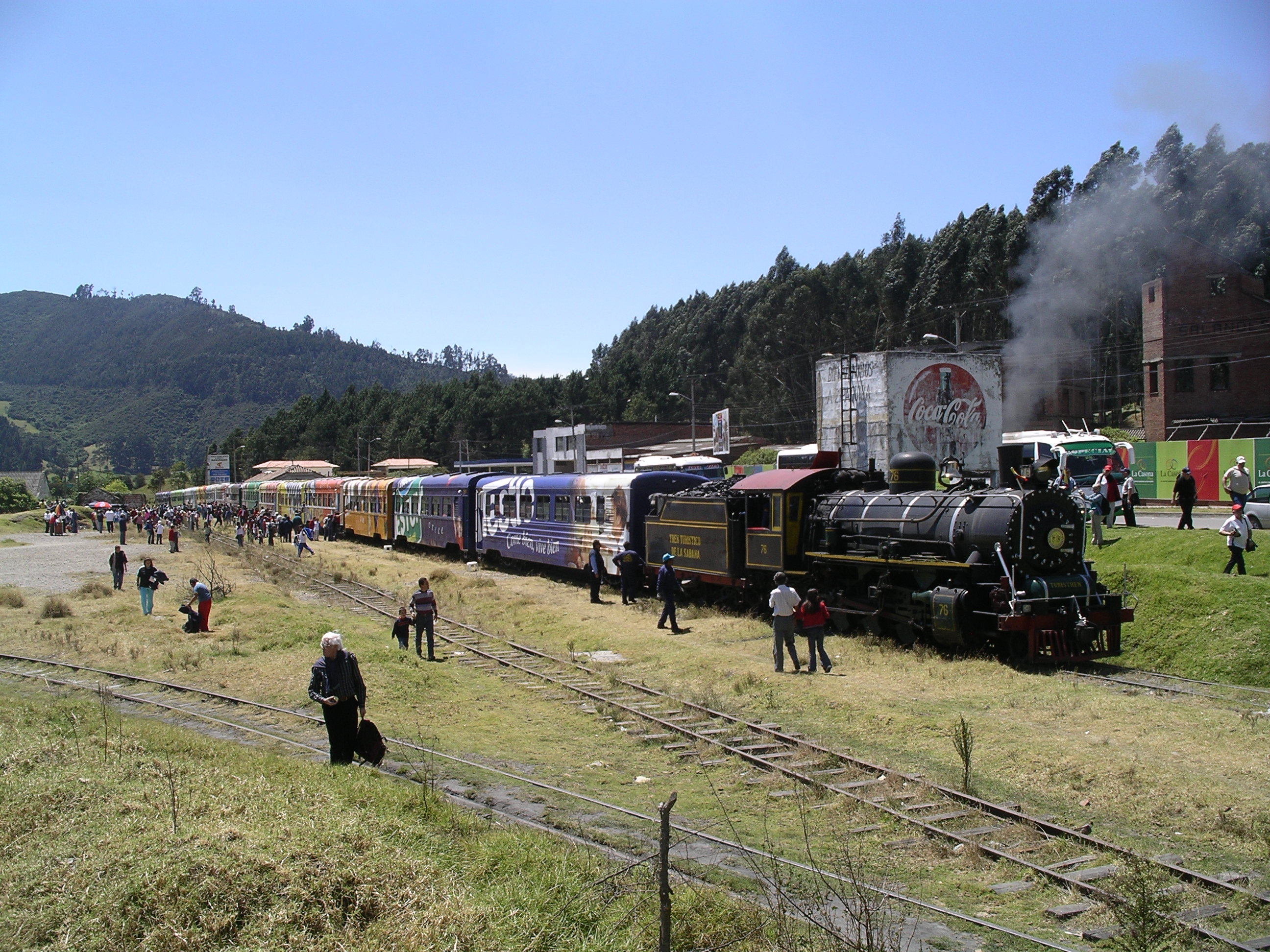
Steam train at Zipaquira station

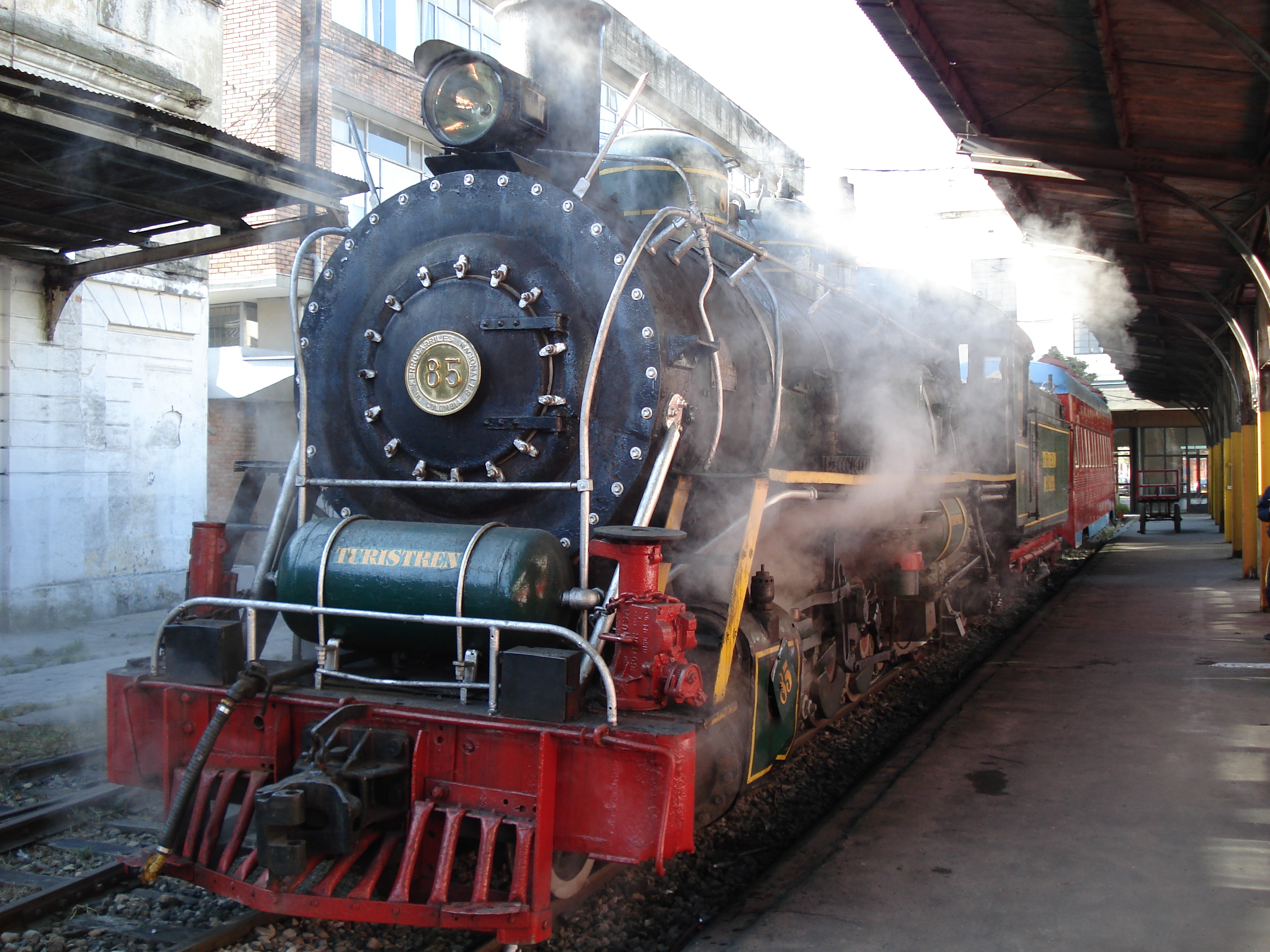
Steam engine 85 shunting stock at La Sabana station, Bogota on 2 January 2011

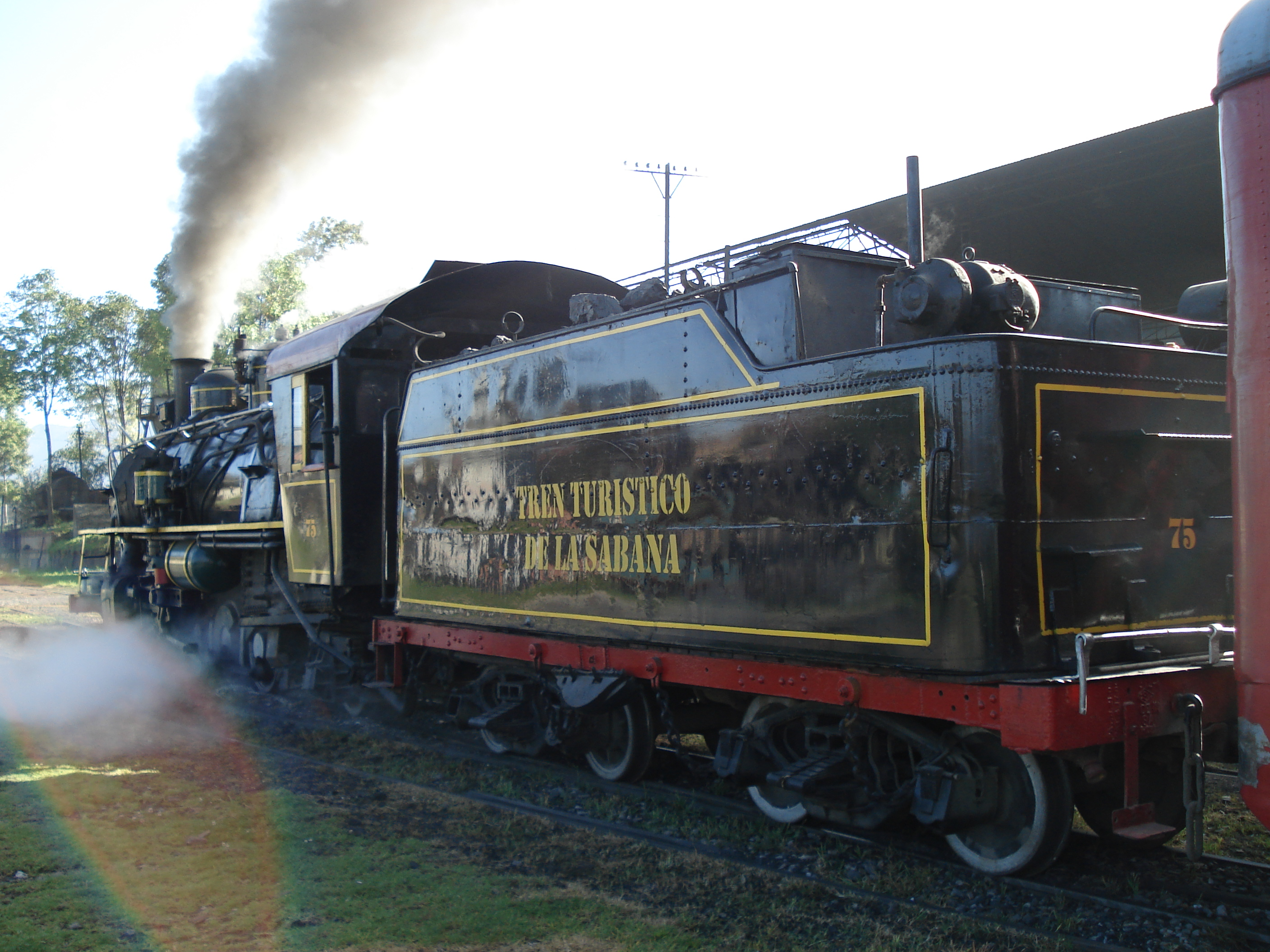
Steam Loco 75 at head of the Tourist Train in Bogota La Sabana station on 2 January 2011

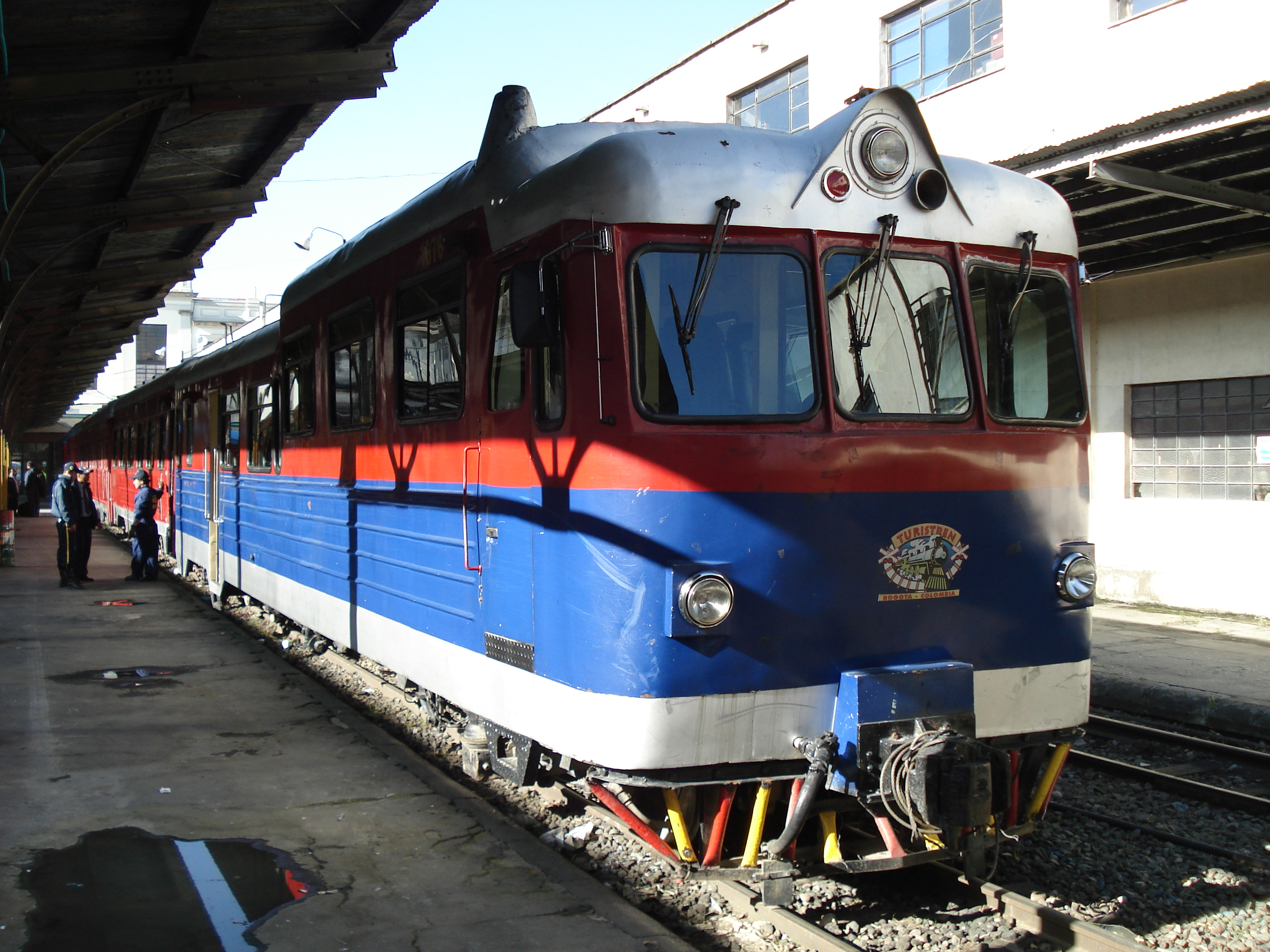
Diesel railcar at La Sabana station, Bogota on 2 January 2011

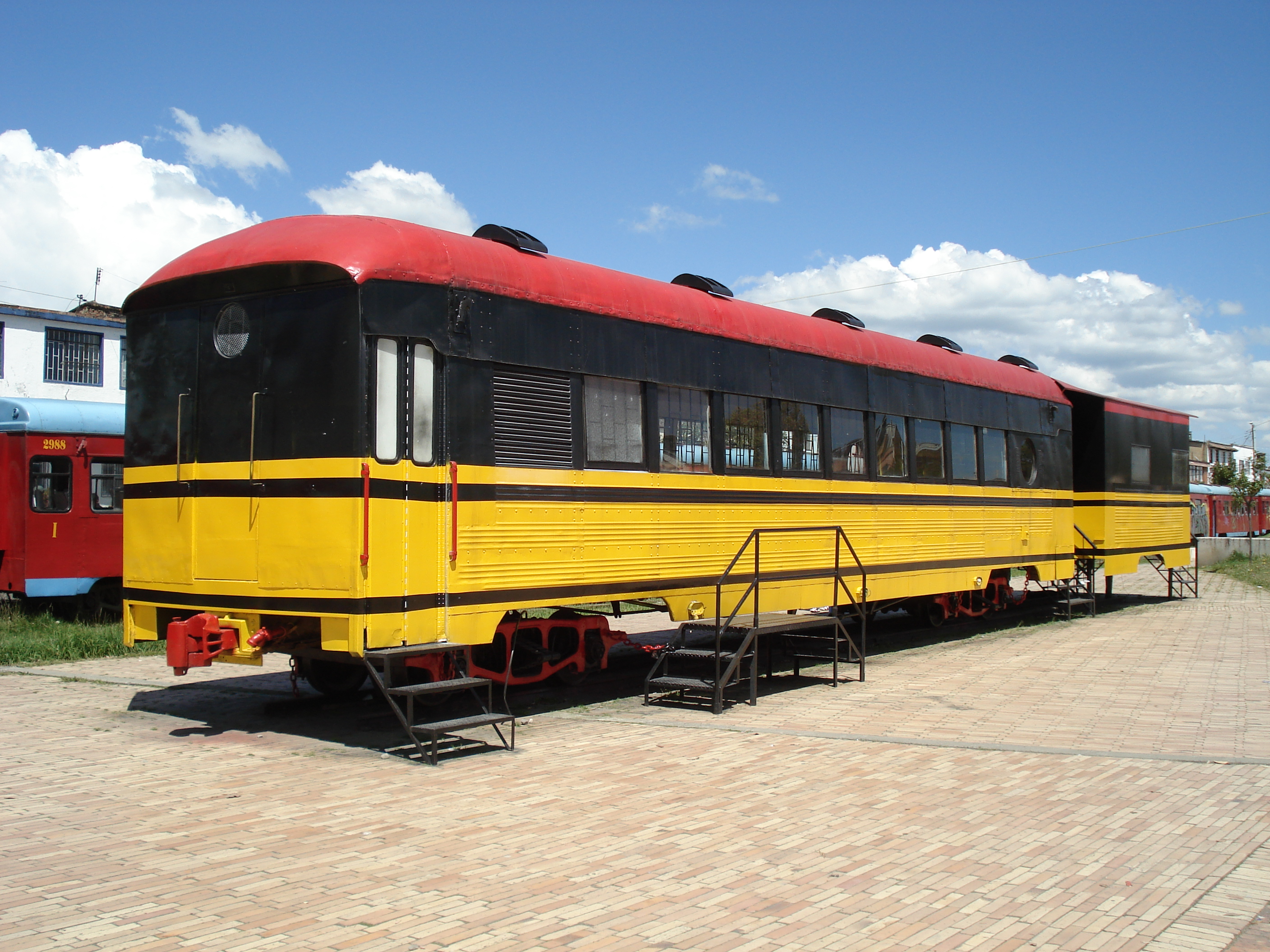
Static train coach exhibition at Zipaquira station on 2 January 2011

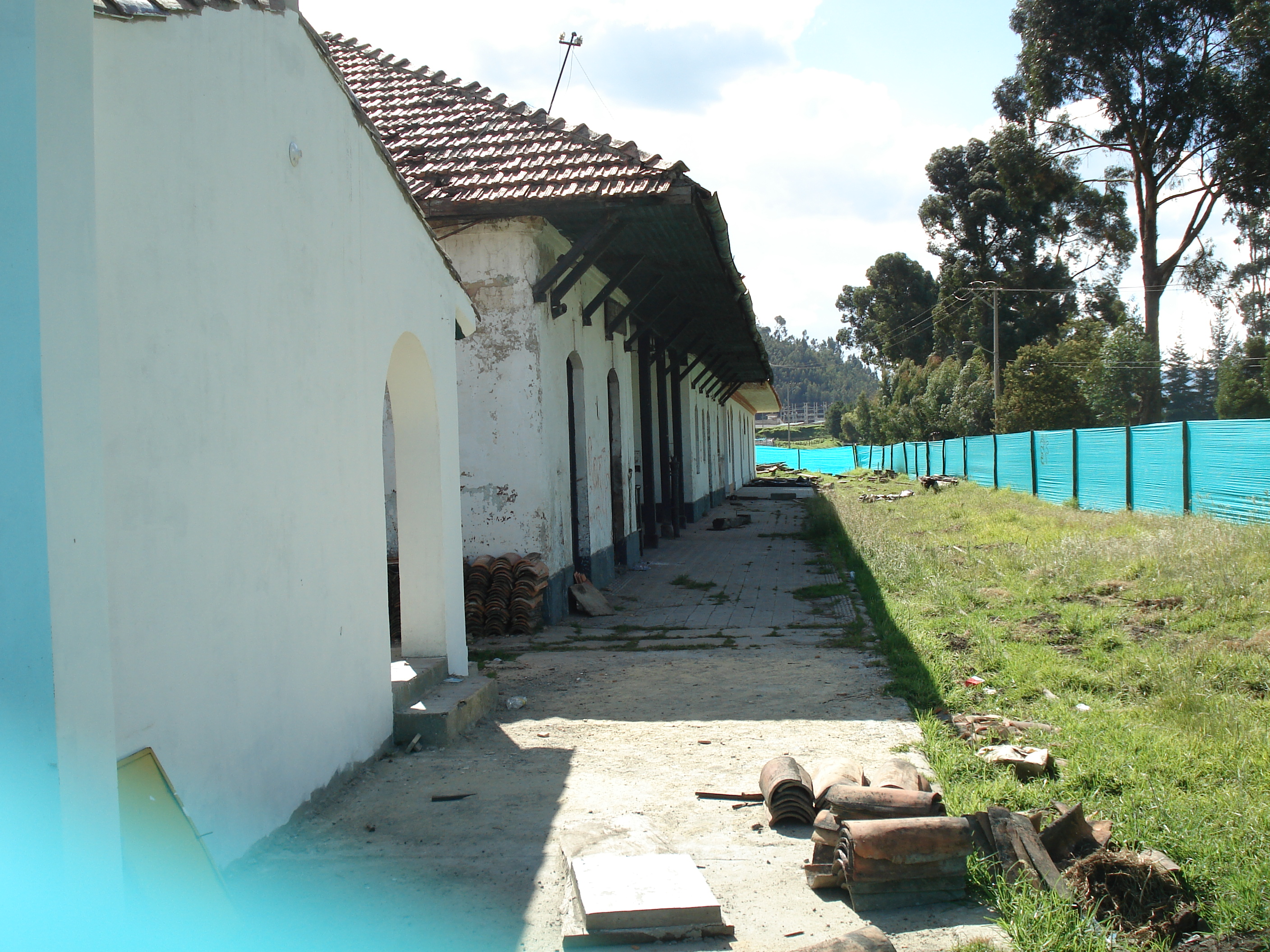
Nemocon station being refurbished on 2 January 2011

== See also ==
- Bogotá Savannah Railway
- Rail transport in Colombia
