= Rail transport in Colombia =

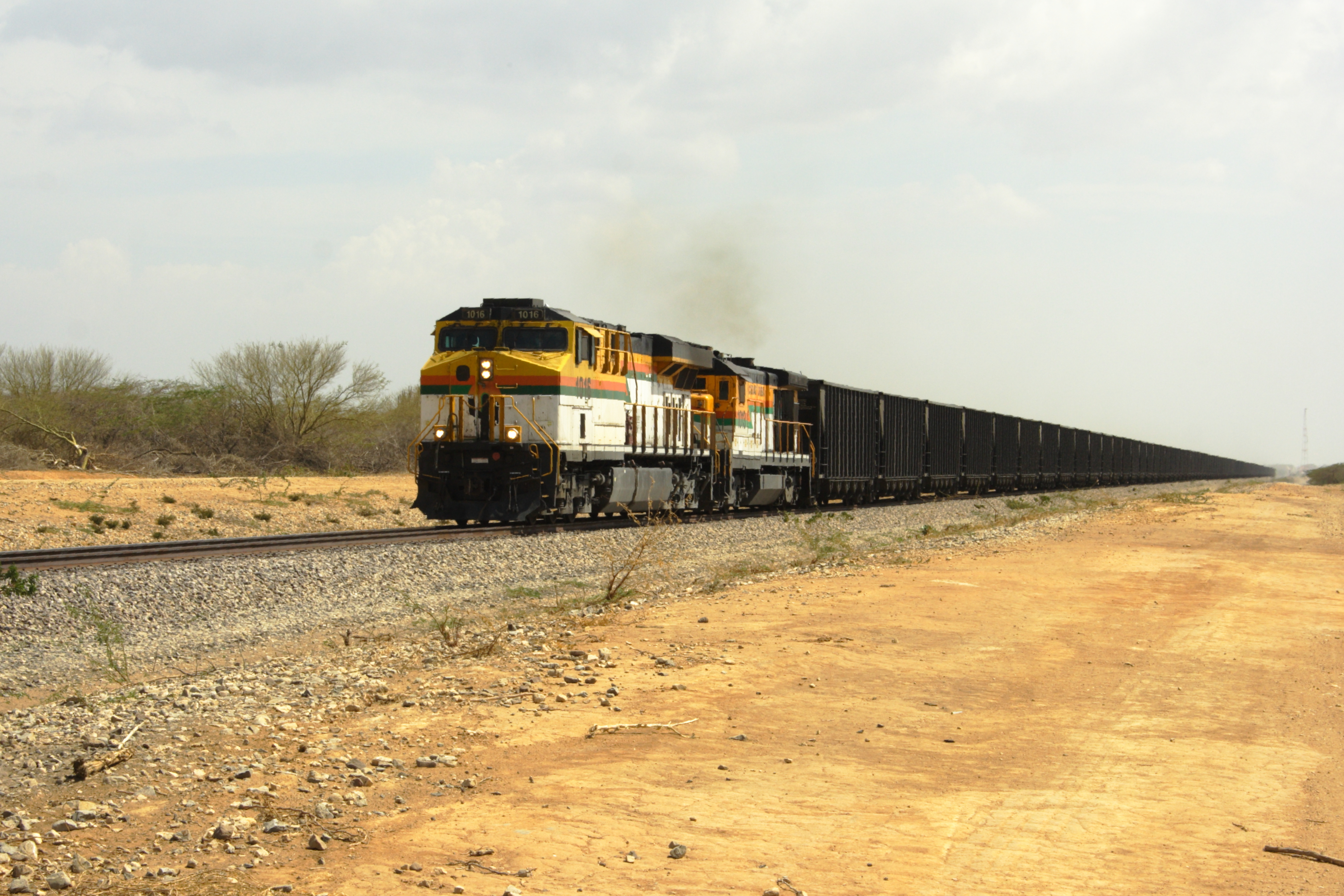
- A Cerrejón coal train near Uribia, La Guajira

Track gauge
- Narrow gauge 914 mm (3 ft): 3,154 km (1,960 mi)
- Standard gauge 1,435 mm (4 ft 8 1/2 in): 150 km (93 mi)

Features
Map
- Railroads of Colombia

The Colombian railway network has a total length of 3,304 kilometres (2,053 mi). There are 150 kilometres (93 mi) of 1,435 mm (4 ft 8 1/2 in) standard gauge connecting Cerrejón coal mines, Tren del Cerrejón, to the maritime port of Puerto Bolivar at Bahia Portete, and 3,154 kilometres (1,960 mi) of 3 ft (914 mm) narrow gauge of which 2,611 kilometres (1,622 mi) are in use. The state-owned railway company, Ferrocarriles Nacionales de Colombia (National Railways of Colombia), was liquidated in the 1990s. Since then passenger rail service in Colombia is provided only as tourist steam trains on the Bogotá savanna railway, now called Turistren, and between Bogotá and Zipaquirá, and a general daily passenger service around Barrancabermeja, and its surroundings (Puente Sogamoso, Garcia Cadena, Puerto Berrio, and Puerto Parra), provided by Coopsercol.

== Railway concessions ==
Railway concessions were awarded on July 27, 1999, to Ferrocarriles del Norte de Colombia S.A. (FENOCO), as the Atlantic concession, and on November 4, 1998, to the Sociedad Concesionaria de la Red Férrea del Pacífico SA, later named Tren de Occidente SA as the Pacific concession. Since 1991 the section La Loma – Puerto Drummond, with 192 kilometres (119 mi), transports coal. Also from July 2003, the section Bogotá - Belencito, with 257 kilometres (160 mi), is operating on the Atlantic concession transporting cement. In the Pacific concession the section between La Paila and Buenaventura has a total of 292 kilometres (181 mi).

In November 2009, the Colombian government set up a new team of consultants and specialists to oversee the estimated $440m Sistema Ferroviario Central railway concession. The project involves building a 1,050 kilometres (650 mi) railway from La Dorada to Chiriguaná, linking Colombia's central area to the Santa Marta port on the Atlantic coast. Part of the proposed project are the construction of the La Dorada stretch, renovating the stretches connecting the districts of La Dorada and Buenos Aires, Puerto Berrío, Envigado and La Dorada and Facatativá, and maintaining the Chiriguaná-Buenos Aires stretch. The tender was suspended due to concerns of corruption, but restarted in February 2011.

== Investment programmes ==
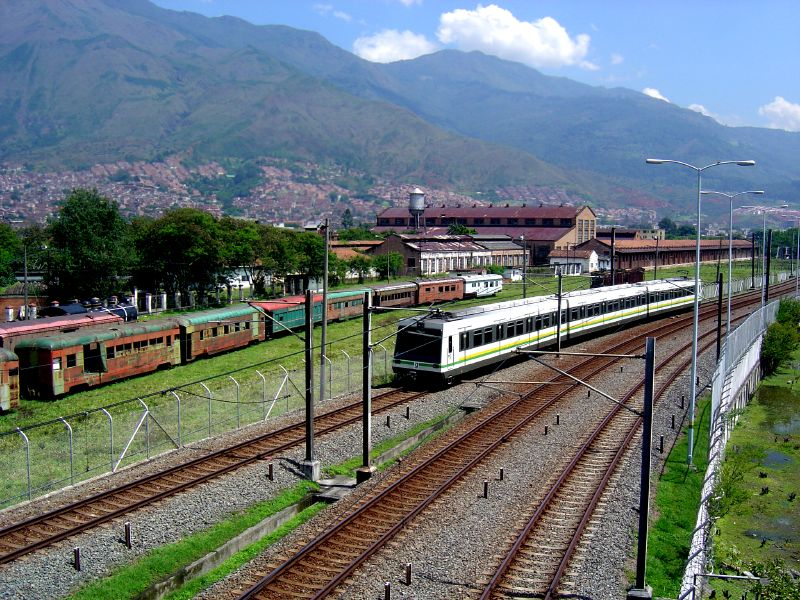
The Medellín Metro, in Medellín

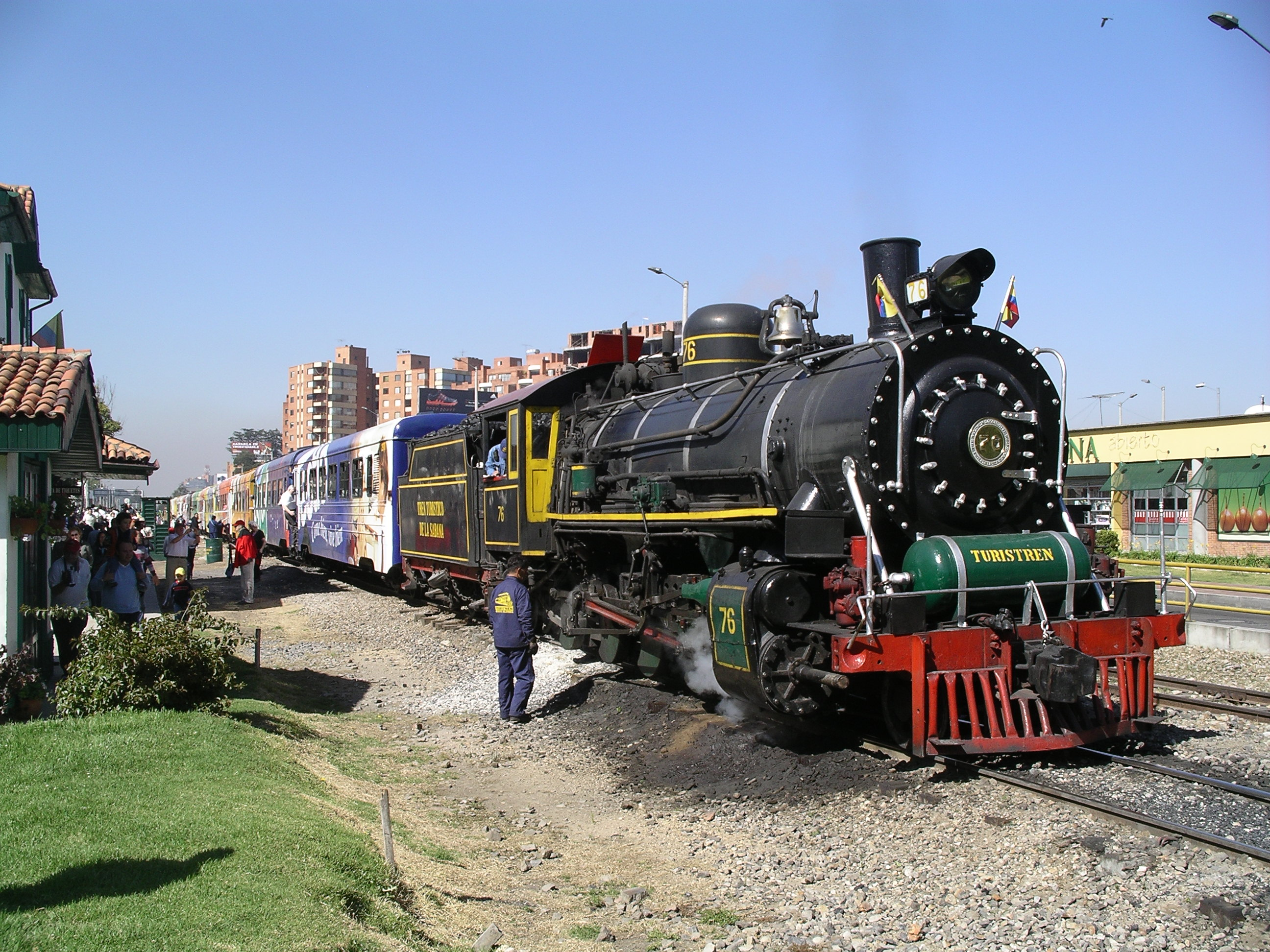
Heritage railway Tren de la Sabana, runs between Bogotá and Zipaquirá

There is a US$600 million investment programme planned for 2008 and studies for a US$350 million new line between Puerto Berrío and Saboya. Under this contract sections of the Atlantic network Neiva – Villavieja and 177 km (110 mi) Ibagué – La Dorada would be built. Other sections to be built include Sogamoso – Tunja and Puerto Berrío – Cisneros.

China is looking into constructing a 220 kilometres (140 mi) stretch of railway that would complete the link between the port cities Buenaventura and Cartagena, connecting Colombia's Pacific and Caribbean coasts. This railway alternative would compete with the Panama Canal. Besides linking two coasts, the railway's aim is to make the import Colombian coal and the export of Chinese manufactured goods to the Americas easier. Colombia hopes China's growing economic presence in the region will further the ratification of the Free Trade Agreement with the United States, the country's biggest trading partner.

A £47m agreement between the Colombian Ministry of Transport and UK Deputy Prime Minister Nick Clegg on February 3, 2014, plans to allow for the rehabilitation of two narrow gauge railway lines (one, 750 kilometres (470 mi) line from La Dorada to Chiriguaná and a second, 300 kilometres (190 mi) line from Belencito to Bogotá). The construction will use local contractors and is expected to take 18 to 24 months. The lines will be for freight traffic and the government is funding the construction but plans to privatize the route upon completion.

== Metro ==
Medellín is the only city thus far (2023) to have built a metro (rapid transit) system. Planning for a Bogotá Metro has been underway for years, and is hoped to open in 2028. Construction started in October 2020.

== Table ==
National Rail System, p. 4
Railway	Line	Construction period
Ferrocarril de Bolívar	Barranquilla - Puerto Salgar - Puerto Colombia	1869-1873
Ferrocarril de Santa Marta	Santa Marta - Ciénaga - Aracataca - Fundación	1881-1906
Ferrocarril de Cartagena	Cartagena - Calamar	1889-1894
Ferrocarril de Girardot	Girardot - Apulo - Facatativá (connection with FC de La Sabana)	1881-1909
Ferrocarril de La Sabana y Cundinamarca	Bogotá - Facatativá - Puerto Salgar	1881-1909
Ferrocarril del Norte	Bogotá - Puente del Común - Cajicá - Zipaquirá - Chiquinquirá - Barbosa	1889-1935
Ferrocarril del Sur	Soacha - Sibaté - Bogotá (connection with FC de La Sabana) - Tequendama Falls	1895-1927
Ferrocarril del Oriente	Puente Nuñez - Fucha River - Yomasa - Usme	1914-1931
Ferrocarril del Carare	Tunja - Vélez	1925-1928
Ferrocarril del Nordeste	Bogotá - Usaquén - Albarracín - Tunja - Sogamoso - Paz del Río	1925-1938
Ferrocarril del Pacífico	Buenaventura - Córdoba - Dagua - Yumbo - Cali - Palmira - Buga - Tuluá - Bugalagrande - Zarzal - Cartago and Cali - Jamundí - Popayán	1872-1927
Ferrocarril del Tolima-Huila	Girardot - Ibagué (connection with FC Armenia) - Chicoral - Espinal - Villavieja - Neiva	1893-1937
Ferrocarril de Antioquia	Puerto Berrío - Pavas - Medellín	1874-1914
Ferrocarril Armenia - Ibagué	Armenia (connection with FC Pacífico) - Ibagué (connection with FC Tolima)	1914-1949
Ferrocarril de Caldas	Pereira - Puerto Caldas - Manizales and Pereira - Quimbaya - Armenia (connection with FC Pacífico)	1915-1929
Ferrocarril de Cúcuta	Cúcuta - Puerto Santander - Venezuela and Cúcuta - Río Táchira	1878-1888
Ferrocarril del Atlántico	Puerto Wilches - Puerto Berrío, Puerto Salgar - Puerto Berrío - Gamarra - Fundación y La Dorada - Puerto Berrío	1950-1961

== Railway links with adjacent countries ==
- Venezuela – (Railroad of Cúcuta) - currently inoperative, proposed to be restored
- Brazil – no
- Ecuador – no
- Peru – no
- Panama – no

== See also ==
- Antioquia Railway
- Transport in Colombia
- List of railway stations in Colombia
