= Barranquilla light rail =

Rail line in Colombia

Tren ligero de Barranquilla
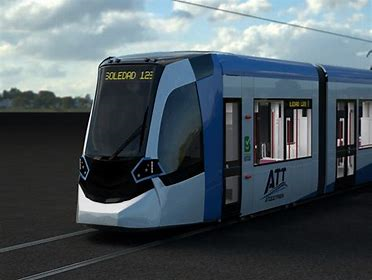

Overview
- Locale: Barranquilla, Atlántico Department, Colombia
- Transit type: Light rail
- Number of lines: 1
- Number of stations: 15

Technical
- System length: 12 km (7.5 mi)
- Track gauge: 1,435 mm (4 ft 8 1/2 in) standard gauge

The Barranquilla light rail (Metro ligero de Barranquilla) is a planned light rail line in the Colombian city of Barranquilla.

== Background ==
In November 2018 the Colombian Ministry of Finance and Public Credit approved a public private partnership financing scheme to build a 12 km light rail line following the north-south Calle 30 serving 15 stations and carrying an estimated 101,000 passengers per day.

== Route ==
The line is planned to traverse Calle 30, linking Barranquillita to the Ernesto Cortissoz International Airport in the Soledad municipality. The distance between stations will be around 800 meters.
