= Heriberto =

Heriberto is the Spanish and Portuguese form of the masculine given name Herbert. It may refer to:

- Osvaldo Heriberto Hurtado Galeguillo (born 1957), Chilean retired footballer who played as a striker
- Heriberto Araújo (born 1983), Spanish journalist and writer
- Heriberto da Cunha (born 1960), Brazilian football player and manager
- Heriberto Jara Corona (1879–1968), Mexican revolutionary and politician, Governor of Veracruz
- Heriberto González (born 1959), Cuban fencer
- Heriberto Herrera (1926–1996), Paraguayan football coach and player
- Heriberto Hernández (born 1999), Dominican baseball player
- Heriberto Lazcano Lazcano (1974–2012), Mexican drug trafficker who heads the Mexican drug cartel Los Zetas
- Heriberto Gil Martínez (1903–1933), Colombian aviator
- Heriberto Morales (born 1975), Mexican former football (soccer) defender
- Heriberto Rojas (born 1942 or '43), former Costa Rican footballer
- Heriberto Rentería Sánchez, the mayor of Puerto Peñasco, Sonora, a city in Mexico
- Heriberto Seda (born 1967), American serial killer who struck New York City from 1990 to 1993
- Heriberto Correa Yepes (1916–2010), Colombian Prelate of Roman Catholic Church

== See also ==
- Estádio Heriberto Hülse, football stadium in Criciúma, Santa Catarina, Brazil
- General Heriberto Jara International Airport (IATA: VER, ICAO: MMVR), international airport at Veracruz, Veracruz, Mexico
- Heriberto Gíl Martínez Airport, located in the municipality of Tulua in the department of Valle del Cauca, Colombia
