= Heriberto Gil Martínez =

Colombian soldier (1903–1933)

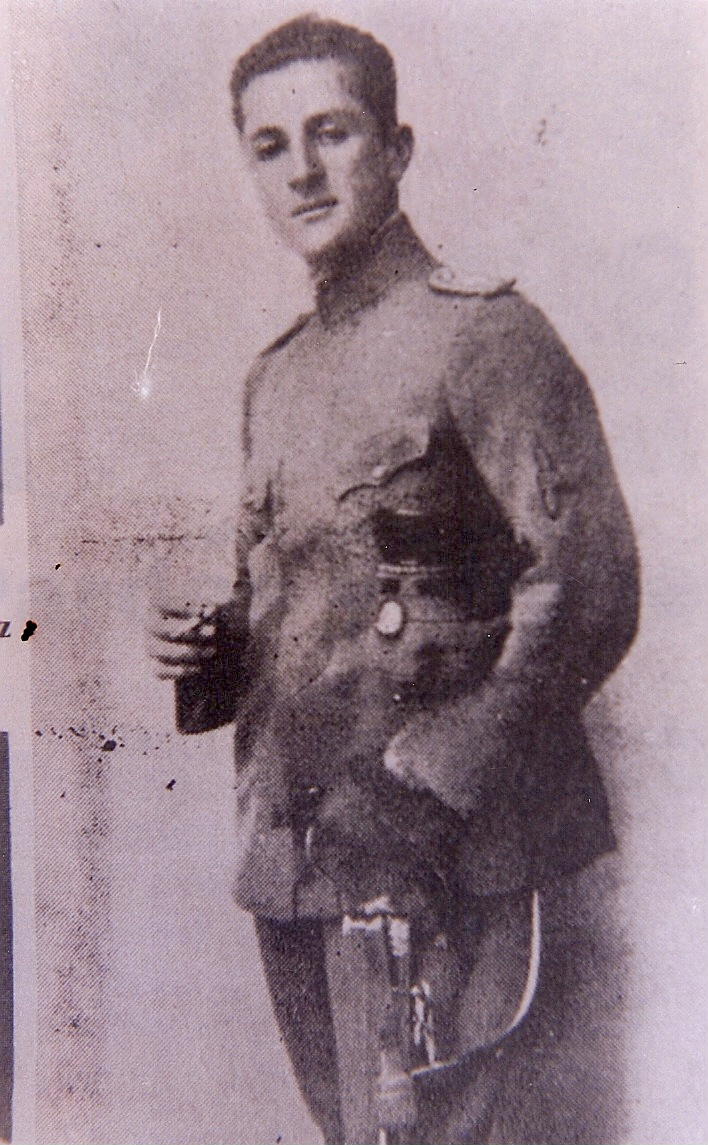
- Born: 24 November 1903; Tulua (Valle del Cauca), Colombia
- Died: 21 May 1933 (aged 29); Caucayá, Putumayo Department, Colombia
- Cause of death: Plane crash
- Occupations: Aviator Pioneer in your country, military pilot in Colombia and France.
- Title: Lieutenant
- Spouse: Leonor Gonzalez Gomez
- Children: Heriberto Gil González, Carlos Gil González and Edgar Gil Gonzalez
- Parent(s): Ramon Nonato Gil and Isabel Martínez Gil

Notes
- Biographical writing by Carlos Ochoa Martinez for History Center Valley Central Unit (UCEVA) The early years of the Colombian military aviation

Heriberto Gil Martínez (24 November 1903 – 21 May 1933) was a Colombian soldier.

== Biography ==
Martínez was born to Ramón Nonato Gil and Isabel Martínez de Gil on 24 November 1903.

== Personal life ==
In 1927, Martínez married Leonor González Gómez. The couple went on to have three children together: Heriberto, Carlos, and Edgar.

== Academic ==
Heriberto first studied at the University of Caldas in 1912 under the direction of Rafael Zuniga. He continued his studies under the guidance of teacher Rubén Cruz Vélez, where he remained until 1914. He went to a public high school at Pacific Gymnasium, which was then under Rector Dr. Rodrigo Becerra, where he remained until 1919. In 1920, he moved to Bogotá and entered the technical institute at the National University of Colombia through an Engineering grant, but after two years, he dropped out to enter as a cadet at the New Granada Military University.

== Military Training ==
In 1922, the college conferred the Diploma of Lieutenant and entered a military course issued by the Office of the Minister himself.

He was assigned to a cavalry regiment under General Paez. He requested a transfer to the Air Force of Colombia, with his application being accepted in 1925. He received the first national Brevet military aviation school that they issued from the director of the school, Commander Pilichody, for open competition among pilots Camilo Daza, Eduardo Gomez Posada, and other officials.

Having been appointed Head of Airport Flanders, where he remained for a short time, he was transferred to the Military Academy in Madrid and then fixed his residence there. A short flight training without permission in the company of Justin Marino, an aircraft mechanic from the School, to the town of Ambalema in December of that year, caused issues with the directorate, and he was then transferred to the Cavalry Regiment Neiva.

== Moving to France ==
In order to improve aeronautical knowledge, the War Department selected a group of officers including Sub-Lieutenant Heriberto Gil Martinez for an extensive specialization course in various disciplines in Paris. Heriberto stood out among the peer group. A result of his bravery and skill, an exception was made to admit Heriberto into "Squadron Storks," a unit in which only French aviation officer can enter. Following the specialization program, he graduated from the famous "Le Bourget" school, where the French government authorized Sub-Lieutenant Gil to join 34th Aviation Regiment. He thus became the first foreigner admitted to this unit, which was generally reserved for French officers only. While serving there, he specialized in fighter aircraft, becoming also the first foreign official to obtain the distinction to taking direct command in the French aviation. In recognition of his merits, the French government awarded him the "Brevet de Pilote French Military Aviator," the highest degree obtainable in the world at the time.

A little before returning to the country, the French government claims that the Colombian permission to send to the war in Morocco because of their skill and daring, and more being already established as a military pilot received French by Brevet days ago, a request that the Colombian government denied on the same tracks, thanks in advance for distinction.

== Back in Colombia ==
Back in Colombia, had several mishaps at not being located with timely resources case by the Ministry, which caused him a normal delay in the return to Colombia with his family, finally returning on February 11, 1931. This was taken in the wrong way, as a contempt of their orders, prompting the issuance of Decree No. 420 of 28 February of that year, by which he retired from active service.

Heriberto Gil had known widely the performance of a Colombian mission that had traveled to Europe in order to purchase items, spare parts and appliances, action on which he had referred in statements and comments through written media, which was also taken into account while issuing the said order., which had been challenged by Lt. Gil respective requesting review by the State Council, which, by final decision dated March 16, 1932, declared "absolutely zero "Decree 420 of February 28, 1931.

== The Colombia-Peru War ==
On 1. September 1932 in the early morning hours, Peruvian soldiers took the Colombian town of Leticia, located within the Amazon called Trapeze, which was established by the Treaty of Limits and Navigation "Salomon-Lozano" signed between the two States on March 24, 1922 = and then invaded Tarapacá. This violation of Colombian sovereignty began the war with Peru, better known as the "Conflict Amazon.

The President Enrique Olaya Herrera, his Minister of War, Captain (r) Carlos Uribe Gaviria, General Alfredo Vasquez Cobo and General Efraín Rojas Acevedo, began the defense the country and took appropriate action, improvising brackets with tourist ships from the north coast of the country joining in near the Colombian-Peruvian jungle to confront the armies of Peru's President Luis Miguel Sánchez Cerro.

Inside the country had attracted huge aggression Peruvian patriotism and to revive the various forces for national defense, the Army, Navy and Military Aircraft, the town was clear of jewelry and valuables to, inter alia, care of the wounded and prisoners of combat and expenses demanded the same military struggle.

The military aviation then going through a very critical situation, but nevertheless this, the Directorate General of Military Aviation formed what was called The Unified Air Fleet under South under Colonel Luis Acevedo Ruiz originally based in Caucayá and then in Puerto Boy, which was divided into three squadrons, small air units under the command of Major Herbert Boy, German pilot and veteran of World War, manager of the airline Scadta.

The squadrons were composed of the cream of Colombian aviation and Lt. Heriberto Gil, known among his peers as the " 'Chato'", Gil was assigned to the Third Squadron, taking as companions Captain Arthur Lemos Inn, Captain Ernesto Esguerra and Captain Jose Ignacio Forero.

The aviators worked in various types of missions, such as observation, reconnaissance, transportation of troops, military supplies and provisions. They had to establish airlift aircraft between several sites because of the difficult conditions of the thick jungle. The contest required to be continuously alert as to always be ready to act quickly and with precision.

Lieutenant Gil participated in the battle of Puerto Güeppi on March 26, 1933.

== Death ==
Just two months after taking Puerto Güeppi, the Fleet Air South, which had already submitted the disappearance of Captain Ernesto Guevara, the 21 May 1933 experiencing a new event. Finding Caucayá Lt. Gil (now Puerto Leguizamo) pursuant to superior orders, should continue to Puerto Boy in the plane Junkers 202 pilot in command of the German Martin Haenichen, mecánicos Rafael Hernandez, Narciso Combariza and Erich Rettich, this also German, as indeed happened, leaving the 202 in midday with that destination.

Account Colonel Jose Ignacio Forero that below Caucayá had begun to form a strong storm, and although the Junkers took off smoothly, to make a shift to La Tagua, a powerful blast he invested, thus falling to the Putumayo River drowned where the pilot of the ship, Lt. Gil and mechanics Combariza and Fernandez. The mechanic Erich Rettich, excellent swimmer, managed to stay on the surface, clinging to one of the floats until he was rescued.

== Regarding ==
=== Book Tulua - History and Geography ===
In the book "Tulua - History and Geography", the historian and writer Guillermo E. toluene Martínez M., note that "the bodies of the abortive military remained for 15 days immersed in the waters of the Putumayo River, and that after that time, the body of Lt. Gil was buried in the cemetery where he stayed for Caucayá 7 years. In 1940, on November 2, the National Government through the Military Aviation Base Cali moved the remains to his hometown of Tulua, where they were placed in a mausoleum erected to his memory by the municipality. He gave them, on behalf of the Government, Flight Lieutenant Hector MATERON and received them on behalf of the municipality and the family of Mr. Guillermo E. hero Martinez M. The Department of Valle del Cauca, and on behalf of the Assembly by Order dated March 23, 1934, honored his memory and ordered the placement of a marble plaque at the birthplace of Lt. Gil Martínez, with the following inscription: "The Department of Valle del Cauca, the hero and patriot aviator, Lt. Heriberto Martínez Gil.

=== Homage ===
Many tributes paid him to toluene military celebrated throughout the national territory by the national government, the Ministry of War, of all the institutions that provided their services, the political directors of civic institutions, with great deployment of national spoken and written press.

=== The renamed Farfan Airport ===
On August 9th, 2004, Council Fernando Caicedo Ochoa, a member of the Municipal Council of Tulua, submitted to the Corporation a draft agreement to rename the Airport Farfan tulueño in recognition of Martinez. On August 20th, 2004, Resolution No. 16 was adopted as follows: "THROUGH WHICH THE FARFAN AIRPORT IS NAMED AFTER HERIBERTO GIL MARTINEZ."

== See also ==
- History of Aviation
- Timeline of aviation
- Heriberto Gíl Martínez Airport
- Colombia-Peru War
