= Heriberto Gíl Martínez Airport =

Airport in Tuluá, Colombia

Heriberto Gil Martínez Airport Farfan Airport
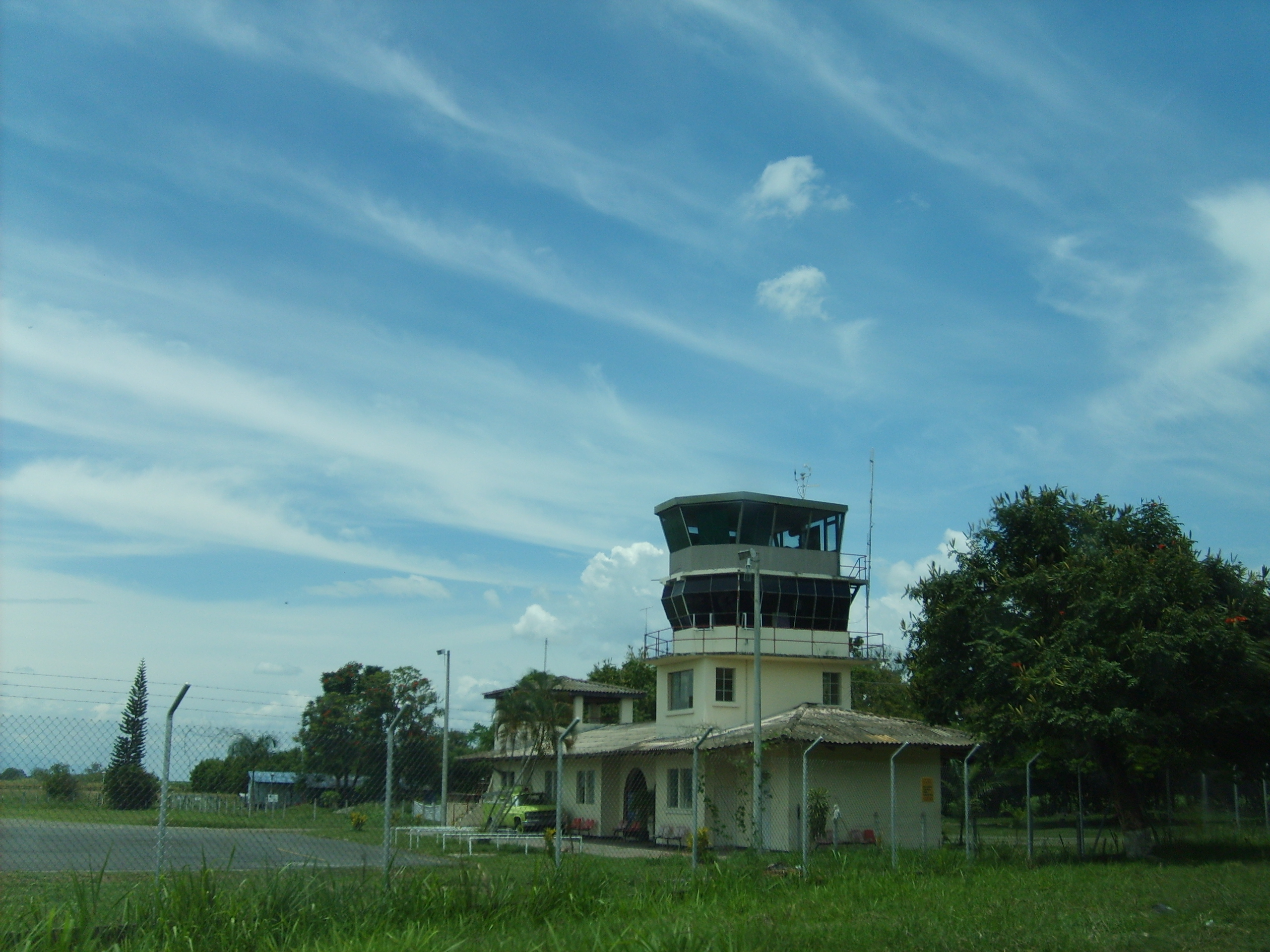
- IATA: ULQ; ICAO: SKUL

Summary
- Airport type: Public
- Operator: Marco Fidel Suárez Air Base EMAVI
- Serves: Tuluá, Colombia
- Elevation AMSL: 3,132 ft (955 m)
- Coordinates: 4°05′40″N 76°13′26″W

Map
- Location of the airport in Colombia

Runways
| Direction | Length | | Surface |
| Direction | m | ft | Surface |
|---|---|---|---|
| 01/19 | 1,200 | 3,937 | Asphalt |
- Sources: GCM WAD Google Maps

The Heriberto Gil Martínez Airport (IATA: ULQ, ICAO: SKUL) is an airport serving the municipality of Tulua in the Valle del Cauca Department of Colombia.

The airport was formerly Farfan Airport, named after an unverified pre-Hispanic tribe. On 20 August 2004, it was renamed after Heriberto Gil Martínez, one of the first aviators in Colombia, who along with Camilo Daza founded the FAC.

It has no commercial air services. Currently the airstrip is used by the Marco Fidel Suárez Military Aviation School (EMAVI) de Santiago de Cali. Although the airport is central in one of the great intermountain valleys of Colombia, its short runway has hindered interest in establishing scheduled air service.

The Tulua VOR-DME (Ident: ULQ) is located on the field.

== See also ==
- Transport in Colombia
- List of airports in Colombia
