= Tolemaida Air Base =

Tolemaida Army Air Field
- IATA: none; ICAO: SKTI

Summary
- Airport type: Military
- Operator: Colombian military
- Location: Nilo, Colombia
- Elevation AMSL: 493 m (1,617 ft)
- Coordinates: 4°14′41″N 74°38′59″W

Map
- Location of the airport in Colombia

Runways
Direction	Length		Surface
Direction	m	ft	Surface
04R/22L	2,829	9,280	Asphalt
04L/22R	436	1,431	Concrete
- Source: DAFIF GCM Google Maps

Tolemaida Army Airfield (ICAO: SKTI) is a Colombian Army Airfield located in Nilo, a municipality of the Cundinamarca department in Colombia.

== Facilities ==
The air base resides at an elevation of 1,617 feet (493 m) above mean sea level. It has two runways: 04/22 has an asphalt pavement measuring 9,280 by 96 feet (2,829 m × 29 m) and 04L/22R with a concrete surface measuring 1,431 by 65 feet (436 m × 20 m).

It is the home of the Colombian National Training Center.

Officially the "Teniente General Gustavo Rojas Pinilla" Army Air Field, the air facilities are part of the larger Tolemaida Military Fort which is located in the town of Nilo, Cundinamarca. Tolemaida is adjacent to the town of Melgar which is located in the Tolima Department, right across the Sumapaz River; therefore, Tolemaida is commonly mistaken for being located in Melgar.

Additionally, there is an actual Air Force Base located in Melgar, the Lieutenant Colonel Luis F. Pinto Parra Air Base, which is the location of the Comando Aéreo de Combate #4 and the Escuela de Helicopteros de la Fuerza Publica, where aviators from all military services, the National Police, and allied armed forces undergo basic helicopter training.

== History ==
A joint commission of the Colombian government and FAC released a report in 2015 documenting the alleged rape of at least 54 girls by United States military personnel between 2003 and 2007, concentrated in and around the Tolemaida Army Airfield and Melgar. The "underage girls were sexually abused by nearby stationed military contractors “who moreover filmed [the abuse] and sold the footage as pornographic material." Due to bilateral immunity agreements the men were immune from prosecution by Colombia.

In January 2020, the United States and Colombian troops conducted airborne insertion from U.S. and Colombian Lockheed C-130 Hercules aircraft and then carried out exercises simulating the capture of an airfield. Consisting of around 75 paratroopers from the U.S. Army's 82nd Airborne Division and 40 personnel from U.S. Army South working with Colombian troops, the airborne assault exercise allowed personnel from both countries to co-operate and exchange tactical knowledge of parachute drops.

== Gallery ==
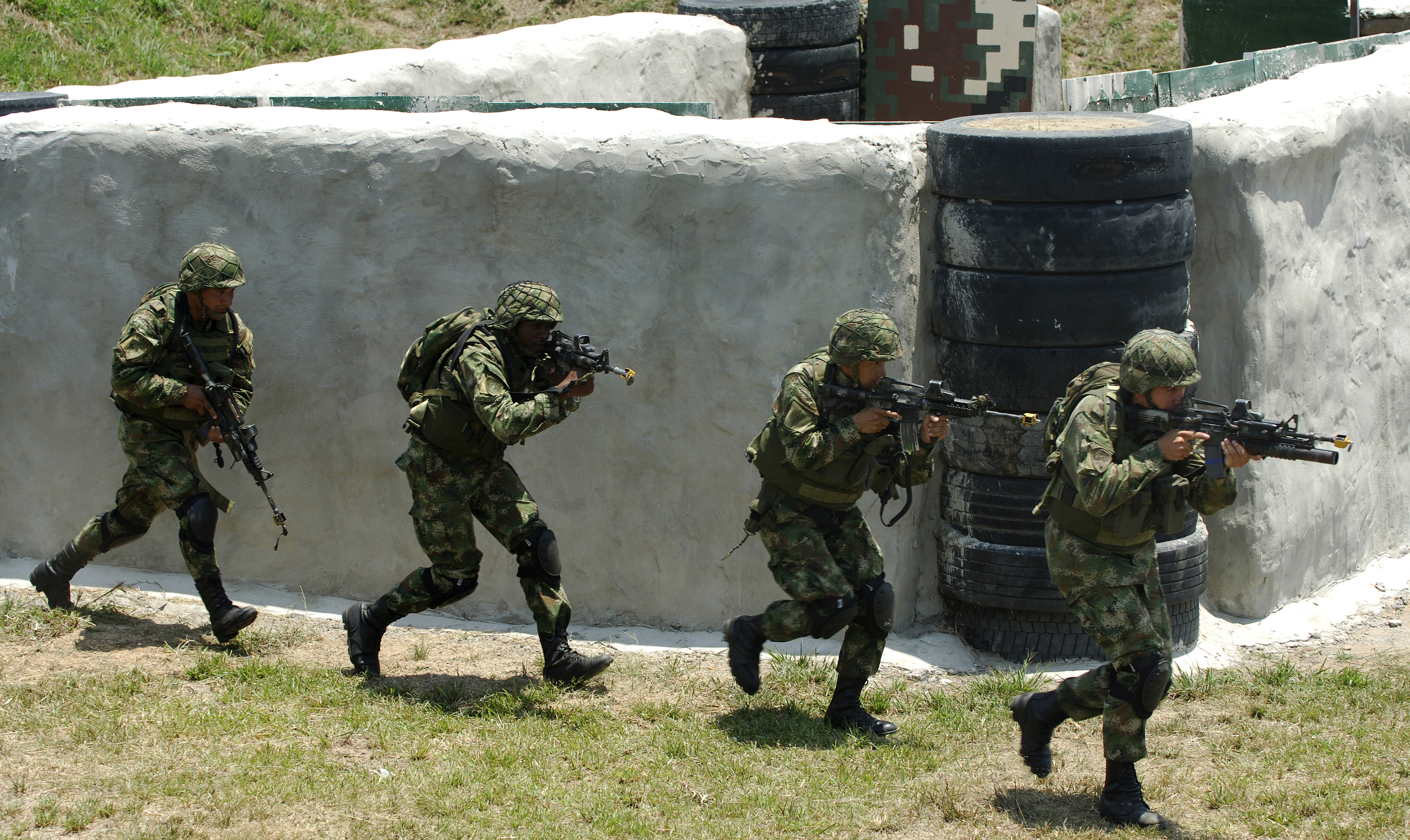
Colombian Army special forces
at Tolemaida Army Air Field, 2007

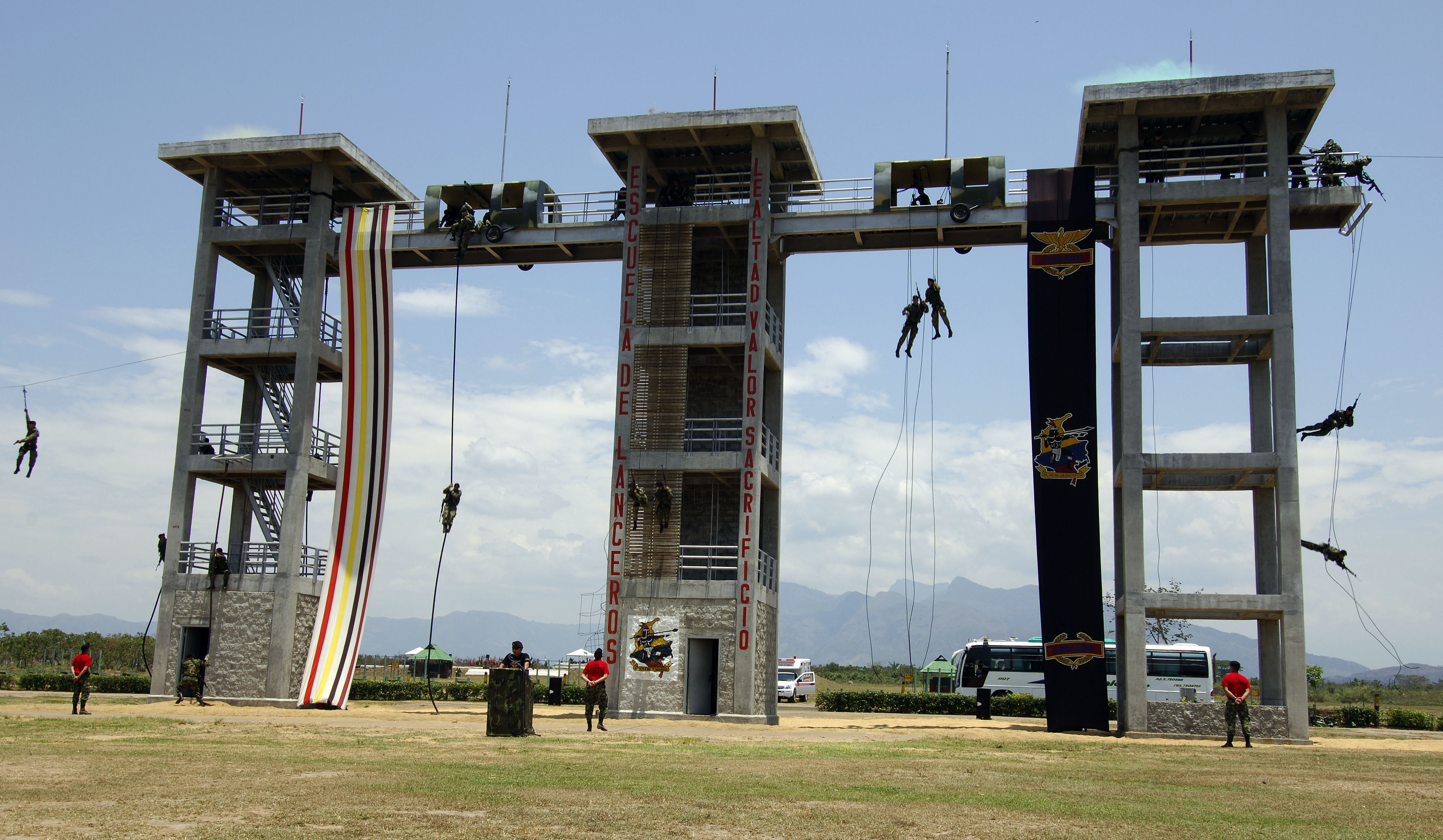
Colombian special forces
at Tolemaida Army Air Field, 2007

== See also ==
- Transport in Colombia
- List of airports in Colombia
