= Lieutenant Colonel Luis F. Pinto Parra Air Base =

Luis F. Pinto Parra Air Base Base Aérea TC. Luis F. Pinto Parra
- IATA: none; ICAO: SKME

Summary
- Airport type: Military
- Operator: Colombian Aerospace Force
- Location: Melgar, Colombia
- Elevation AMSL: 313 m (1,027 ft)
- Coordinates: 4°12′59″N 74°38′06″W

Map
- Location of the airport in Colombia

Runways
Direction	Length		Surface
Direction	m	ft	Surface
05/23	1,154	3,785	Asphalt
04/22	402	1,320	Concrete
- Source: DAFIF GCM Google Maps

Lieutenant Colonel Luis Francisco Pinto Parra Air Base (Spanish: Base Aérea Teniente Coronel Luis Francisco Pinto Parra) (ICAO: SKME) is a Colombian military base assigned to the Colombian Aerospace Force (Fuerza Aeroespacial Colombiana or FAC) Combat Air Command No. 4 (Comando Aéreo de Combate No. 4 or CACOM 4). It is in Melgar, a municipality in the Department of Tolima in Colombia, and is named in honor of Lieutenant Colonel Luis Francisco Pinto Parra.

== Facilities ==
The base is at an elevation of 1,028 feet (313 m) above mean sea level. It has two runways: 05/23, with an asphalt surface 3,785 by 92 feet (1,154 m × 28 m); and 04/22 with a concrete surface 1,320 by 65 feet (402 m × 20 m).

== See also ==
- Transport in Colombia
- List of airports in Colombia
