= Colombian Aerospace Force =

Air and space warfare branch of the Military Forces of Colombia

- Fuerza Aeroespacial
- Emblem of the Colombian Air Force
- Founded: 15 February 1921; 105 years ago
- Country: Colombia
- Type: Air force / space force
- Role: Aerial warfare Space warfare
- Size: 25,000 active personnel; 276 aircraft
- Part of: Colombian Armed Forces
- Nickname: FAC
- Mottos: Latin: Sic Itur ad Astra; "Such is the pathway to the stars"; Spanish: Somos la Fuerza; "We are the Force"
- March: Colombian Air Force Hymn
- Mascot: Capitan Paz
- Anniversaries: 8 November
- Engagements: Colombia–Peru War; Colombian conflict
- Website: www.fac.mil.co

Insignia
- Roundel

- Fin flash

- Flag

- Ensign

Aircraft flown
- Attack: A-29, A-37, AC-47T
- Fighter: IAI Kfir (current), to be replaced by JAS 39 Gripen
- Helicopter: UH-60, UH-1, Bell 212, AH-60
- Reconnaissance: SA2-37A/B, Skymaster C-337H, Super King Air, SR-560
- Trainer: T-34, Cessna 172S, T-27, T-90, Bell 206, T-6 Texan II
- Transport: C-130, C-295, C-212

The Colombian Aerospace Force (FAC, Spanish: Fuerza Aeroespacial Colombiana) is the air force of Colombia. The Colombian Aerospace Force is one of the three institutions of the Military Forces of Colombia charged, according to the 1991 Constitution, with working to exercise and maintain control of Colombia's air and to defend its sovereignty, territorial integrity, and constitutional order. It is one of the largest air forces in the Americas (after the United States and Brazil) and has increased its activity due to important roles in the fight against narco-terrorism. Its main force includes 21 IAI Kfirs as defense fighters and 12 Cessna A-37 Dragonfly plus 24 Embraer 314 Super Tucano for counterinsurgency.

The FAC has been used in observation and aerial combat missions since the Colombian-Peruvian war of 1932 and also operated during the Second World War in the islands of San Andrés.

The institution was previously known as the Colombian Air Force (Spanish: Fuerza Aérea Colombiana), but its name was changed to Colombian Aerospace Force on 8 November 2024 through an act of legislation.

== History ==
=== Creation ===
Military aviation began in Colombia in 1919 with the creation of a military aviation school for the Colombian Army. Previously by Law 15 of 1916 of September 7 two commissions were sent overseas to study new technological advancements in aviation, infantry, cavalry, engineering and trains. Officers pertaining to the Colombian Army were also sent to take a course on flight training on techniques and tactics. The school was then created in Colombia along with the Colombian National Army Aviation as a fifth regiment by Law 126 of 1919 of December 31 authorized by President of Colombia, Marco Fidel Suárez. The unit was officially activated on February 15, 1921 in Flandes, Department of Tolima with the support of a French mission led by Lieutenant Colonel Rene Guichard. The Aviation School initially had 3 Caudron G.3 E-2, 3 Caudron G.4 A-2 and four Nieuport Delage 21 C.1. The school was closed due to financial hardships in 1922.

The School of Military Aviation was reopened on November 8, 1924 in Madrid, Department of Cundinamarca with the support of a Swiss mission headed by Captain Henry Pillichody. The aircraft used for training were 4 Wild WT and 8 Wild X performing the first air review on August 7, 1927. Then on December 28, 1928 the first combat aircraft was shown in Colombia, the Curtiss Falcon O-1.

=== War with Peru ===
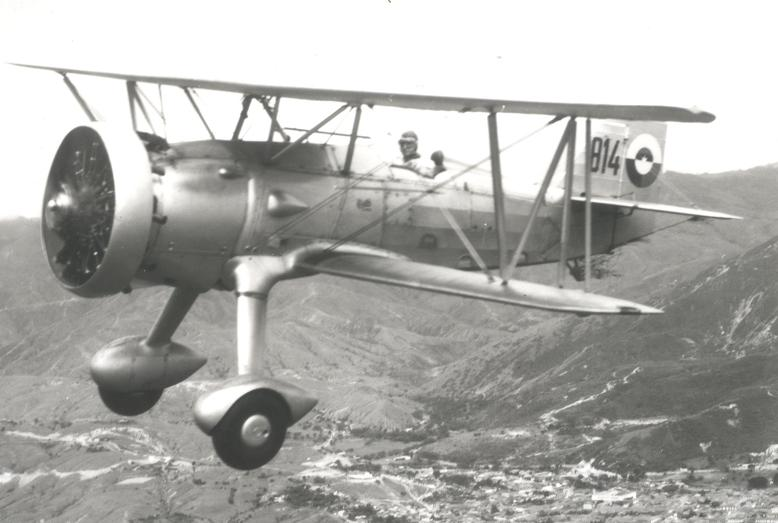
The Hawk II F11C-origin, helped in fighting Guepí in Peruvian garrison, which lasted eight hours

On September 1, 1932, Peruvian civilians crossed into Colombian territory and invaded the town of Leticia in the Colombian Amazon claiming that the town was Peruvian territory. The Colombian military aviation only had 11 instructors, four Curtiss-Wright CW-14R Osprey air combat support planes and one Curtiss Falcon O-1. The military aviation then received full financial support from the Congress of Colombia. Colombia bought aircraft from Germany and the United States, while others were activated from the airline operating in Colombia SCADTA (Sociedad Colombo-Alemana de Transporte Aéreo) and their pilots, which included some German citizens, one of these was Major Herbert Boy. The imported aircraft were 4 Junkers F.13, 4 Junkers W 34 and 3 Junkers K 43, 6 Junkers Ju 52, 2 Dornier Merkur II, 4 Dornier Wal, 20 Curtiss Falcon F-8F and 30 Curtiss Hawk II F-11C.

The contingent was then sent to southern Colombia to fight Peruvian forces with the main mission of delivering supplies to the front lines, aerial reconnaissance and air to land attacks. The fleet was divided into three squadrons with Puerto Boy as the main camp site. Support bases were in Caucaya airstrip (Puerto Leguízamo), El Encanto, Puerto Arica, La Pedrera and Tarapacá. The main combat operations started on February 14, 1933 in Tarapacá where the Peruvian garrison was bombed by seven Colombian aircraft and later assaulted by land forces. Later, on March 26, in the village of Guepi eleven Colombian planes and two cannon boats (MC Cartagena y MC Santa Marta) bombarded Peruvian positions and took over the town.

The last military actions of the conflict with Peru were on May 8, 1933 and in which there was an aerial engagement between the two forces. Peruvian planes were attacking the fluvial fleet of Colombia over the Algodón River and were surprised by the Colombian squadron. One of the Peruvian aircraft, a Douglas O-38P was gunned down and taken to Colombian territory. On May 24, 1933 a cease fire was declared after an agreement was reached with the intervention of the League of Nations. The town of Leticia was returned to Colombia. The captured plane was then returned to Peru. As a result of the war, four pilots died in four accidents during non-combat related actions. Among these was one of the German pilots. Four planes were lost in these accidents a Falcon O-1, an Osprey C-14, a Junkers F-13 and a Curtiss F-11.

=== World War II ===
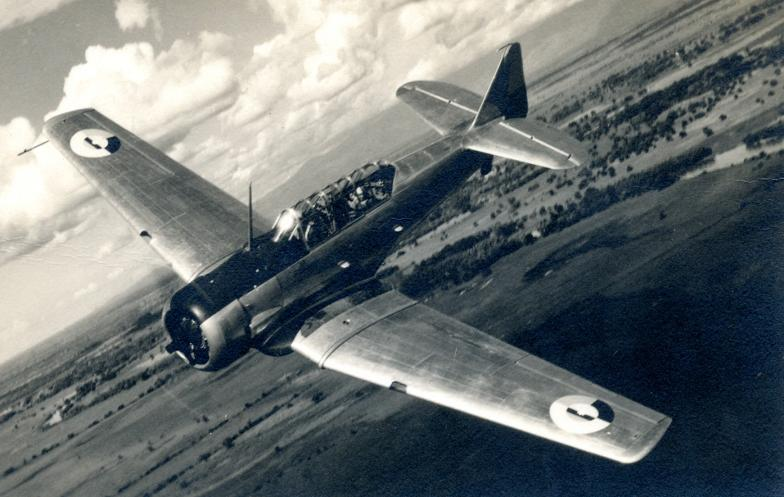
The AT-6 Texan served during World War II, defending the country's Caribbean coast

The diplomatic breach between Colombia and the Axis countries (Germany, Italy and Japan) was declared on December 18, 1941, when President Eduardo Santos made the decision following the Japanese attack on U.S. naval installations at Pearl Harbor, Hawaii. Thereafter, the Colombian government introduced special measures to limit and counter the Axis military action in areas of national jurisdiction. On June 23, 1942, a German submarine attacked and sank the Colombian schooner Resolute, 50 miles northwest of the island of San Andrés. The same schooner had rescued some Marine officers and 23 British Royal Navy survivors of a capsized ship, 200 miles north of Cartagena just five days before.

Following these events, the government decided to patrol and monitor the Pacific Coast and the Colombian Caribbean coast. The Palanquero Air Base commanders moved one fighter squadron and a Combat Reconnaissance Squadron, consisting of F-8 Falcon aircraft, to Barranquilla. In 1943, the Falcons were relieved of their mission and replaced by the AT-6 Texan. This squadron was active until 1945, when the AT-6 were transferred back to Palanquero Air Base.

=== Early 1930s until 2026s ===
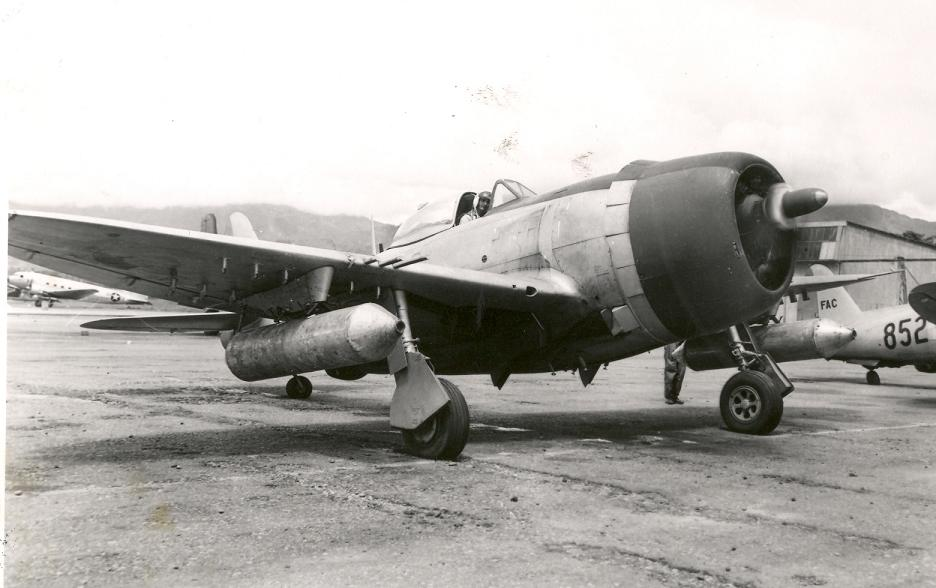
Thunderbolt F-47D of the Colombian Air Force in 1946

- In 1936 the first combat monoplanes made of aluminum were purchased by the Colombian Air Force; 3 Seversky P-35/2PA Guardsman.
- While the war was ongoing in southern Colombia, the Air Force built bases in the towns of Buenaventura and Cartagena. The base in Buenaventura was dubbed Air Base of the Pacific and covered the area of the Colombian Pacific region by the Pacific Ocean and began operations on January 26, 1933. The main purpose of this base was to protect the Pacific coast from any maritime intervention since there were reports that the Peruvian protected cruiser BAP Almirante Grau was patrolling the area, as well as two submarines. The Buenaventura base closed in 1949 while the base in Cartagena was handed over to the Colombian Navy in 1936 becoming the ARC Bolívar Naval Base, the most important naval base in Colombia.
- Once the conflict with Peru was over the bases in the Amazon basin were dismantled and the troops sent to new bases like Tres Esquinas Air Force Base in the Department of Caqueta, Palanquero Air Force Base in the Department of Cundinamarca and San José del Guaviare in the Department of Guaviare. Meanwhile, the School of Military Aviation was moved to Cali, and leaving in Madrid the Radiotelegraphy and Maintenance Schools.
- During World War II, North American T-6 Texans and Boeing PT-17 Stearmans were received from the US for pilot training. Soon after World War Two, the Aviación Militar became an independent part of the armed forces, and the Colombian Air Force was created.

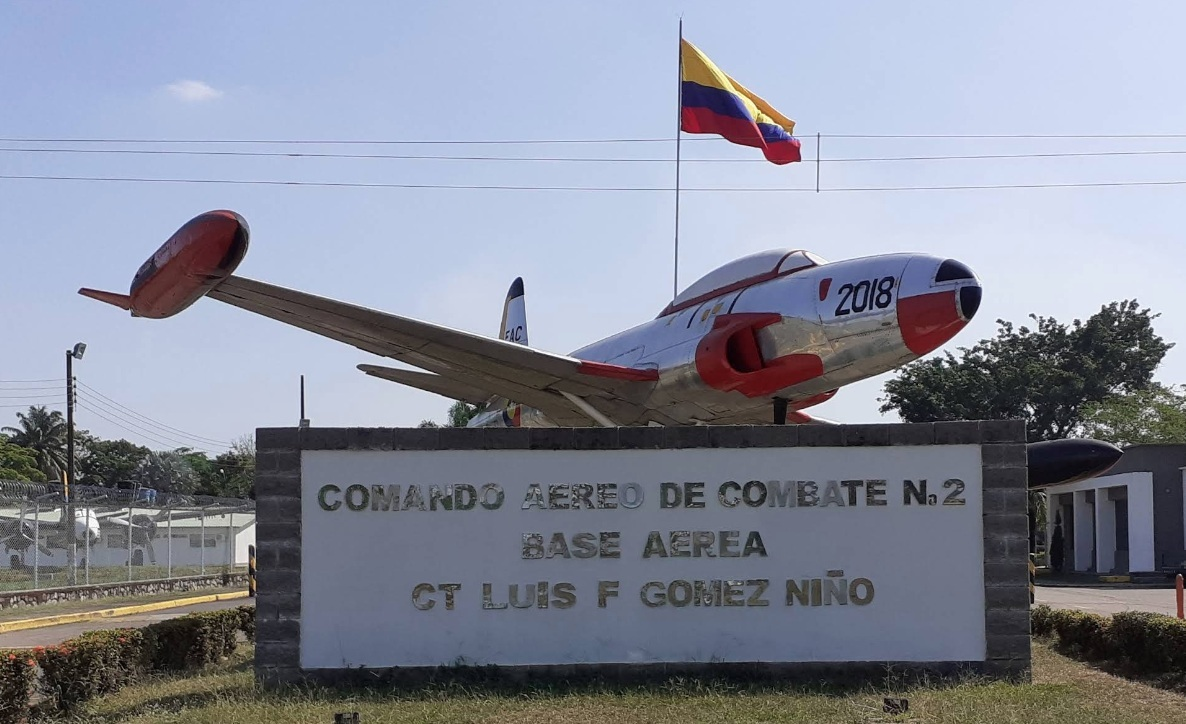
Captain Luis F. Gómez Niño Air Base

- During the period of La Violencia, The Air Force had the necessity to expand its radius of action, so in 1947 the aeródromo nacional de Apiay was created, named the 17 of November 1948 Base Aérea de Apiay (currently Captain Luis F. Gómez Niño Air Base), today it home of the Comando Aéreo de Combate No. 2. In this period, the Air Force became more involved in counterinsurgency tasks and B-26C Invaders were acquired. Also, in 1954, the jet age began for the Colombian Air Force with the arrival of 6 Silver Star T-33 and six Canadian Sabre Mark IV F-86 in 1956. The F-86 were retired from service 1966, while the T-33 continued to operate until 1972 when 18 Mirage 5 fighters arrived in three different versions. Sixteen F-80 Shooting Stars were also delivered.
- In 1952, Hiller UH-12 helicopters arrived to the country, initially acquired for the Ministerio de Obras Públicas, but later assigned to the Air Force. In consequence, in 1954, the first helicopter base was created in Melgar, Tolima. Nowadays this base is known as Base Aérea “Teniente Coronel Luis F. Pinto Parra”, home of the Comando Aéreo de Combate No. 4 and the Joint Helicopter School of the Armed Forces. In 1959, with the inauguration of the El Dorado International Airport, the Base Aérea de Transporte Militar was created, later renamed as Base Aérea “Brigadier General Camilo Daza”, home today of the Comando Aéreo de Transporte Militar (CATAM). In 1962 in order to integrate economically and socially the furthest regions of the country the Servicio Aéreo a Territorios Nacionales Satena was created.
- Around 1960 the military transport element expanded, with the acquisition of the C-130 Hercules, other types incorporated during the sixties were, the UH-1 Huey, T-37 Tweet and T-41 Mescalero.
- In 1977, to increase control in the northern part of the country, the Grupo Aéreo del Norte was created in Malambo, Atlántico, home today of the Comando Aéreo de Combate No. 3. In 1979, the Grupo Aéreo del Caribe (GACAR) was created, to defend the sovereignty of San Andrés and Providencia from the pretensions of Nicaragua. In 1983, the Grupo Aéreo de Oriente was created in Marandúa, Vichada to exert more control of the airspace in the eastern part of the country.
- Further expansion took place in the eighties with considerable deliveries of the A-37 Dragonfly, which had earned fame over Vietnam. At the end of the decade a batch of Kfir C2 fighters was delivered from Israel and subsequently upgraded to Kfir C7 by the Comando Aéreo de Mantenimiento (CAMAN) in Madrid in the nineties. The Mirages were upgraded to the same standard by CAMAN, with the installation of canards and improved fuel systems. Both types are also equipped for air-to-air refuelling from the FAC's sole Boeing 707 tanker and transport aircraft. The nineties saw the delivery of specialised COIN-aircraft like the OV-10A Bronco and Embraer Tucano trainers, some of the latter are able to carry bombs and unguided rockets. These aircraft operate mainly over the east of the country, where the Los Llanos region has a high level of guerrilla activity. They regularly deploy to Puerto Carreño under the command of the Grupo Aéreo del Oriente formed in 2000. To deal with continuing guerrilla activity, Escuadrones Aerotácticos (tactical squadrons) were formed at the main FAC bases in the late nineties, consisting of several types of helicopters and AC-47 gunships supplied by their respective Grupos.
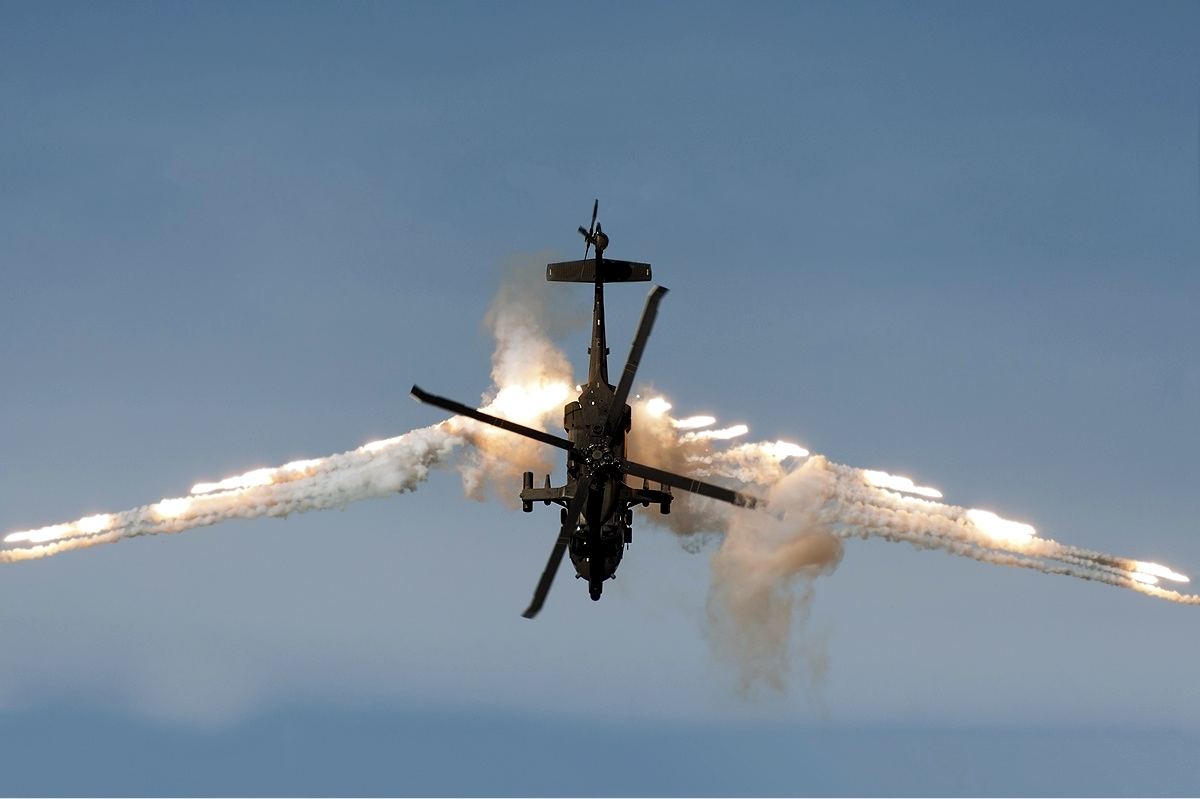
  A Colombian Air Force AH-60L Arpía III firing its flares
- Finally in 1990 the Base Aérea de Rionegro, Antioquia is activated, center of operations of the UH-60 Black Hawk, today this base is called Comando Aéreo de Combate No. 5.
- The 1999 'Plan Colombia' emphasizes on technology, rather than on large numbers of new aircraft being procured, although several new UH-60 Black Hawk helicopters entered FAC service in recent years, including a dedicated attack variant developed by the Colombian Air Force in conjunction with Elbit Systems and Sikorsky, the AH-60L Arpía. Other recently acquired types include Schweizer SA2-37A Condors and Cessna 560 Citations equipped with cameras and sensors to monitor guerrilla and narcotic related activities. Technology upgrades are scheduled for the Bronco fleet, the venerable AC-47 gunships and Huey-helicopters.
- The Colombian Air Force monitors the country's airspace and intercepts suspicious flights, occasionally forcing non-compliant aircraft to the ground. A Hawker 800 carrying 1.2 tonnes of cocaine was shot to the sea in 2015.

== Organization ==
Combat Air Commands (Comando Aéreo de Combate or CACOM):

- Comando Aéreo de Combate No. 1 (CACOM 1) "Captain Germán Olano Moreno Air Base"
  in Palanquero / Puerto Salgar, Cundinamarca
  - Grupo de combate Nº 11
    - Escuadrón de Combate 111 Dardos (Kfir C12)
    - Escuadrón de Combate Táctico 113 Fantasma (AB212 Rapaz, AC-47T Fantasma, AH-60L Arpía IV)
    - Escuadrón de Combate 116 Tango (T-37B, T-37C)
- Comando Aéreo de Combate No. 2 (CACOM 2) "Captain Luis F. Gómez Niño Air Base"
  in Apiay / Villavicencio, Meta
  - Grupo de Combate Nº 21
    - Escuadrón de Combate 211 Grifos (A-29B Supertucano)
    - Escuadrón de Combate 212 Tucanos (AT-27 Tucano)
    - Escuadrón de Combate Táctico 213 (AH-60L Arpía IV, C212-300, C208-675, SA2-37B Vampiro, SR-560)
  - Grupo de Combate Nº 22 located in Yopal, Casanare.
- Comando Aéreo de Combate No. 3 (CACOM 3) "MG. Alberto Pauwels Rodríguez" Air Base
  in Malambo / Barranquilla, Atlántico
  - Grupo de Combate 31
    - Escuadrón de Combate 311 Dragones (A-37 Dragonfly).
    - Escuadrón de Combate 312 Drakos (A-29B Supertucano).
    - Escuadrón de Combate Táctico 313 (AC-47T Fantasma, Bell 212 Rapaz, C-95A, SA2-37B Vampiro, UH-1 Huey II).
- Comando Aéreo de Combate No. 4 (CACOM 4) TC. Luis Francisco Pinto Parra Air Base
  in Melgar, Tolima
  - Grupo de Combate 41
    - Escuadrón de Combate 411 Rapaz (Bell 212).
    - Escuadrón de Asalto Aéreo 412 (Bell UH-1H/P).
    - Eccuadron de Ataque 413 Escorpión (MD 500/530).
  - Grupo CSAR.
  - Escuela de Helicópteros de las Fuerzas Armadas.
    - Escuadrón de Vuelo (Bell UH-1H, Bell 206, Bell OH-58 Kiowa).
- Comando Aéreo de Combate No. 5 (CACOM 5) "GR. Arturo Lema Posada" Air Base
  in Rionegro, Antioquia.
  - Grupo de Combate 51
    - Escuadrón de Combate 511 (AH-60L Arpía IV)
    - Escuadrón de Operaciones Especiales 512 (Ce208-675, UH-60A/L Halcón)
- Comando Aéreo de Combate No. 6 (CACOM 6) CT. Ernesto Esguerra Cubides Air Base
  in Tres Esquinas, Caquetá
  - Grupo de Combate 61
    - Escuadrón de Combate 611 (AT-27 Tucano, A-29B Supertucano)
    - Escuadrón de Combate Táctico 613 (AC-47T Fantasma, Bell 212 Rapaz, C212-300, SA2-37B Vampiro, UH-1H-II, Scan Eagle UAV)
- Comando Aéreo de Combate No. 7 (CACOM 7) Marco Fidel Suárez Air Base
  in Cali, Caquetá
  - Grupo de Combate 71
    - Escuadrón Preparatorio 111 (S10VT, SZD-54, Cessna 172S)
    - Escuadrón Básico 712 (T-90)
    - Escuadrón de Combate Táctico 713 (B212, C208, C212, AC-47T, UH-60L)

Transportation and Maintenance:

- Comando Aéreo de Transporte Militar (CATAM) "BG. Camilo Daza Álvarez"
  in Bogotá D.C.
  - Grupo de Transporte Aéreo 81
    - Escuadrón de Transporte 811 (C-130B/H, C295M/100)
    - Escuadron de Evacuación Médica.
  - Grupo de Vuelos Especiales 82
    - Escuadrón de Transporte Especial 821 (B707-323C, B737-74V, Beech 300ELINT, Beech 350, Bell 412HP, C-95A, Ce208B, Ce550, F28-3000(C), PA-42-720, PA-42T, RC690D, RC695)
- Comando Aéreo de Mantenimiento (CAMAN) "MY. Justino Mariño Cuesta"
  in Madrid, Cundinamarca
  - Grupo de Transporte Aéreo 91
    - Escuadrón de Transporte 911 (Beech C90, C212-300)

Air Groups:

- Grupo Aéreo del Caribe (GACAR) "TC. Benjamín Méndez Rey"
  on San Andres Island, San Andrés, Providencia y Santa Catalina
  - Escuadrón de Combate 101
    - Escuadrilla de Combate Táctico 1013 (Beech C90)
- Casanare Air Group (GACAS) - Grupo Aéreo de Casanare
  - Embraer A-29B Super Tucano
- Grupo Aéreo del Oriente (GAORI) "CR. Luis Arturo Rodríguez Meneses"
  in Marandúa, Vichada
  - Grupo de Combate 111
    - Escuadrilla de Combate Táctico 1113 (AC-47T Fantasma, AB212 Rapaz, UH-1H, Scan Eagle UAV)

Training:

- Escuela Militar de Aviación (EMAVI) "Marco Fidel Suárez"
  in Santiago de Cali, Valle del Cauca
  - Grupo de Educación Aeronáutica
    - Escuadrón Básico
  - Grupo de Combate 71
    - Escuadrón de Combate Táctico 713
- Escuela de Suboficiales FAC (ESUFA) "CT. Andrés María Díaz Díaz"
  in Madrid, Cundinamarca
- Instituto Militar Aeronáutico (IMA) "CT. José Edmundo Sandoval"
  in Bogotá D.C.

Airline:

- Servicio de Aeronavegación a Territorios Nacionales (SATENA)

== Personnel ==
As of 2010, the Aerospace Force fields approximately 13,500 personnel, including 2,171 officers, 3,304 Non-commissioned officers, 903 student officers, 4,673 soldiers, these usually allocated to base security, Military Police etc., and 2,382 civilians, the latter usually dedicated to specialized technical or professional activities, e.g. medical, communications, etc.

=== Ranks and insignias ===
The tables below display the rank structures and rank insignias for the Colombian Aerospace Force personnel. (Note: Colombia is not a member of NATO, so there is not an official equivalence between the Colombian military ranks and those defined by NATO. The displayed parallel is approximate and for illustration purposes only.)

==== Officers ====
| Rank group | General/Flag/Air officers | | | | | Senior officers | | | Junior officers |
|---|---|---|---|---|---|---|---|---|---|---|---|
| Colombian Aerospace Force |
| Colombian Aerospace Force | | General del aire | | Mayor general del aire | Brigadier general del aire | Coronel | Teniente coronel | Mayor | Capitán | Teniente | Subteniente |
| Abbr. | - | GR | - | MG | BG | CR | TC | MY | CT | TE | ST |
| English | - | General of the Air | - | Major General of the Air | Brigadier General of the Air | Colonel | Lieutenant Colonel | Major | Captain | Lieutenant | Second Lieutenant |

==== Non-commissioned officers and airmen ====
| Rank group | Senior NCOs | | | | | | Junior NCOs | | Enlisted |
|---|---|---|---|---|---|---|---|---|---|---|
| Colombian Aerospace Force |
| Colombian Aerospace Force | Técnico jefe de comando conjunto | Técnico jefe de comando | Técnico jefe | Técnico subjefe | Técnico primero | Técnico segundo | Técnico tercero | Técnico cuarto | Aerotécnico |
| Abbr. | TJCC | TJC | TJ | TS | TP | T2 | T3 | T4 | AT | - |
| English | Joint Command Chief Technician | Command Chief Technician | Senior Chief Technician | Chief Technician | Technician 1st Class | Technician 2nd Class | Technician 3rd Class | Technician 4th Class | Airman |

== Aircraft ==
=== Current inventory ===
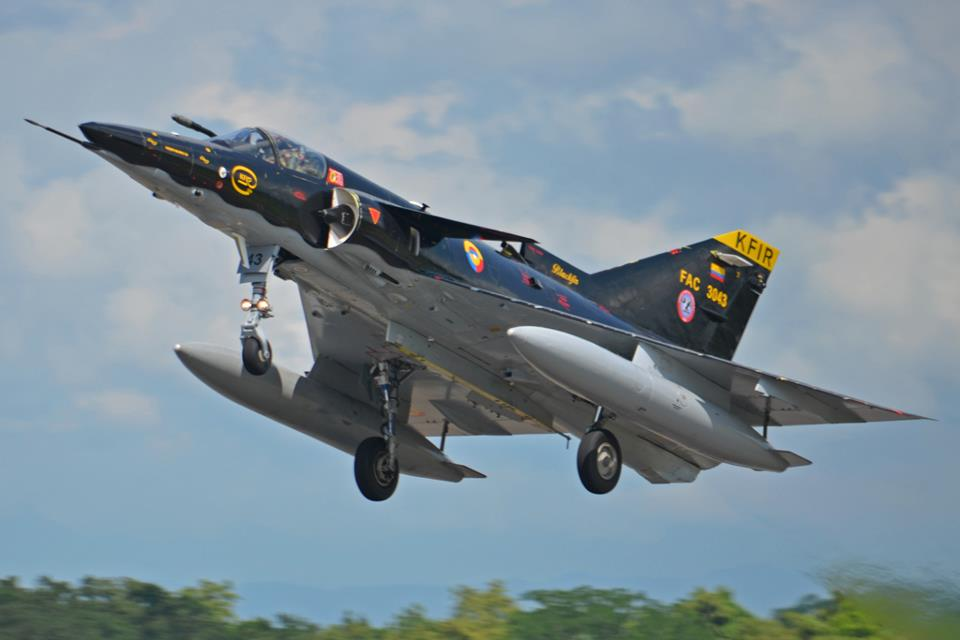
IAI Kfir

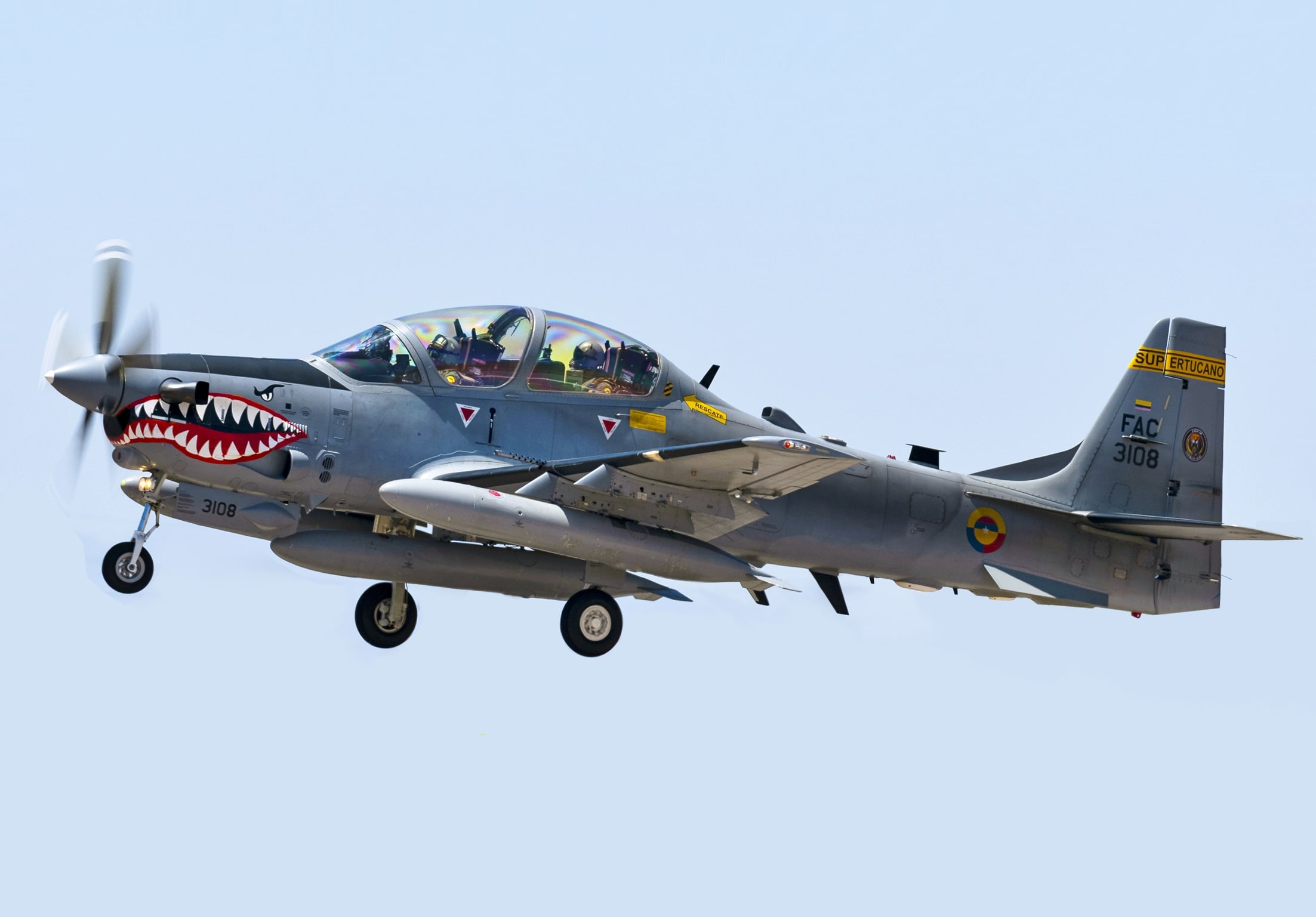
Embraer EMB 314 Super Tucano

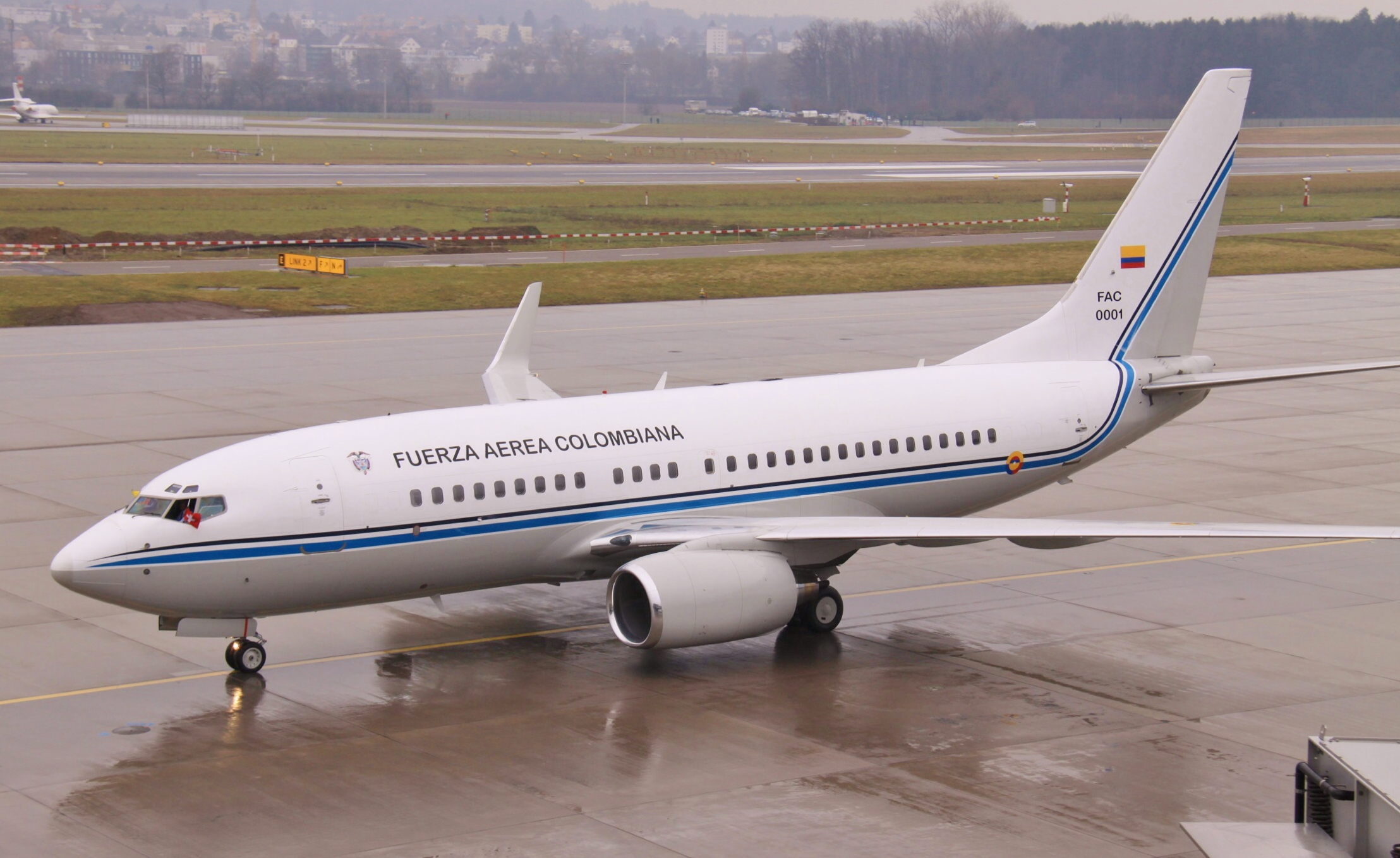
FAC Boeing 737 at Zürich Airport

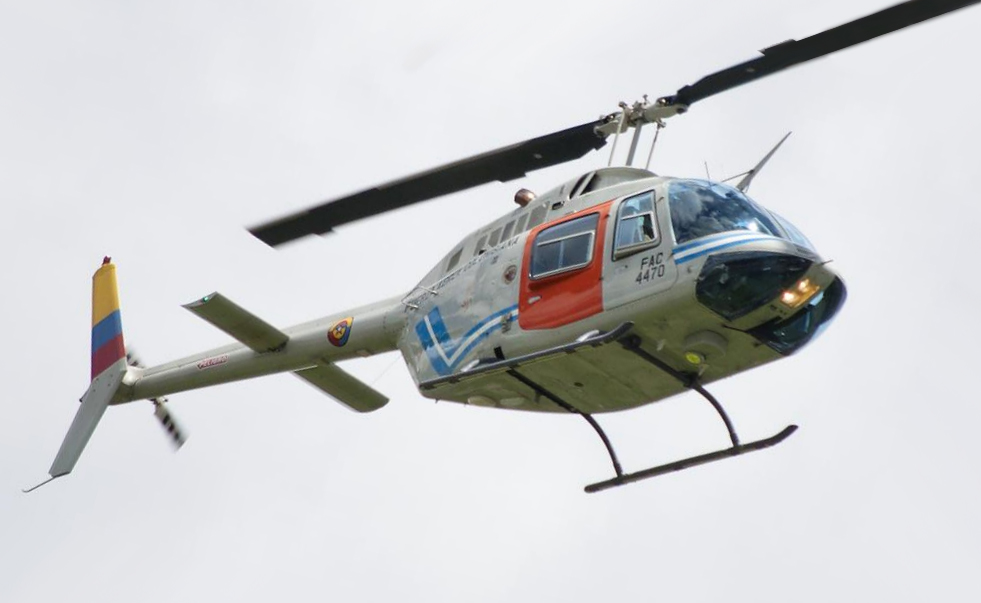
Bell 206 during the Colombian Bicentennial

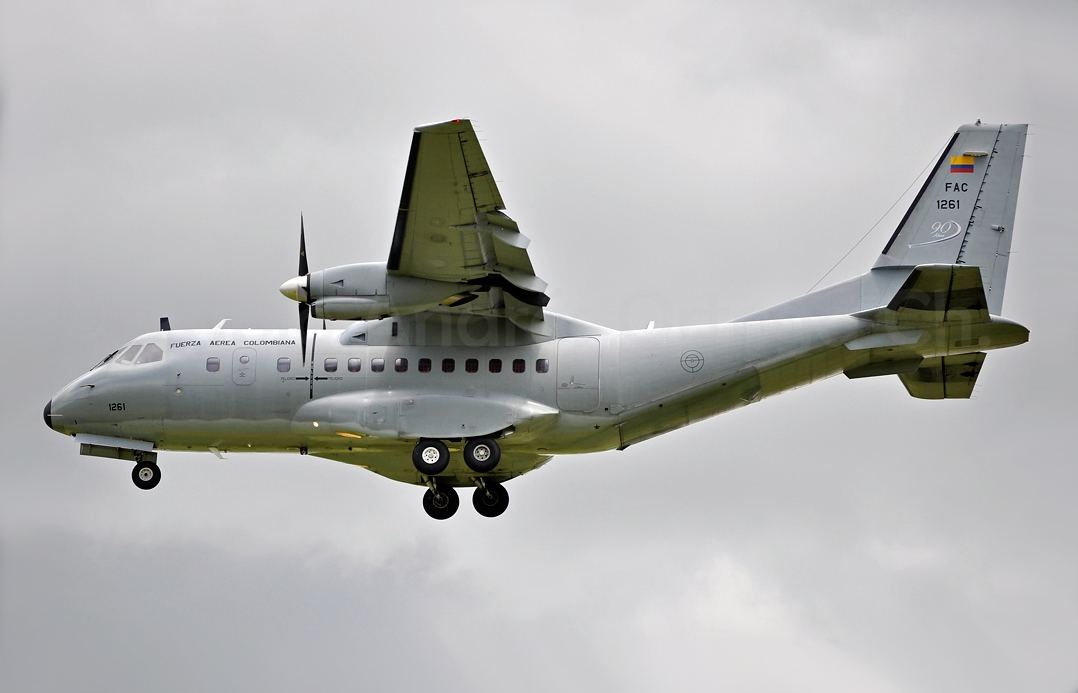
CASA CN-235

| Aircraft | Origin | Type | Variant | In service | Notes |
Combat aircraft
| JAS 39 Gripen | Sweden | multirole | | | 17 on order |
| IAI Kfir | Israel | Multirole | | 16 | Phasing out |
| Basler BT-67 | United States | Attack / CAS | AC-47T | 6 | Modified DC-3 with turboprop engines, and mounted guns |
| EMB 314 Super Tucano | Brazil | Light attack / COIN | | 24 | |
Reconnaissance aircraft
| Cessna 208 | United States | Reconnaissance | | 6 | |
| Cessna 560 Citation Ultra | United States | Surveillance | | 5 | |
| CASA CN-235 | Spain | Reconnaissance | | 1 | |
Tanker
| Boeing KC-767 | United States | Aerial refueling / Transport | MMTT | 1 | Tanker transport conversion by Israeli Aerospace Industries |
| Embraer C-390 Millennium | Brazil | Aerial refueling / Transport | KC-390 | | 2 on order. |
Transport
| Boeing 737 | United States | VIP transport | | 5 | |
| C-130 Hercules | United States | Transport | C-130B/H | 9 | 1 C-130 Hercules crashed on 23 March 2026 |
| CASA C-212 | Spain | Transport | | 4 | |
| CASA C-295 | Spain | Utility transport | | 7 | |
| Cessna 208 | United States | Utility transport | | 10 | |
| Embraer EMB 110 | Brazil | Utility / Transport | | 2 | |
| Embraer Legacy 600 | Brazil | VIP transport | | 2 | |
| Turbo Commander | United States | Transport | | 2 | One provides maritime patrol |
| Super King Air | United States | Transport | 90/350 | 11 | 3 provide electronic warfare |
| Piper PA-34 | United States | Light transport | | 1 | |
| Piper PA-31T | United States | Light transport | | 1 | |
Helicopters
| Bell 212 | United States | Utility | | 11 | |
| Bell UH-1 | United States | Utility | | 52 | 2 are Bell 205s. |
| Sikorsky UH-60 | United States | SAR / COIN | U/M/AH-60L | 24 | |
| MD 500 Defender | United States | Light utility | 530 | 4 | |
Trainer aircraft
| Bell 206 | United States | Rotor-craft trainer | | 47 | |
| Cessna T-37 | United States | Jet trainer | | 17 | |
| EMB 312 Tucano | Brazil | Advanced trainer | | 14 | |
| Beechcraft T-6 Texan II | United States | Advanced trainer | T-6C | 8 | 2+14 on order |
UAV
| Boeing Insitu ScanEagle | United States | surveillance | | 6 | |
| Elbit Hermes 450 | Israel | surveillance | | 6 | |
| Elbit Hermes 900 | Israel | surveillance | | 2 | |

=== Former aircraft ===
Previous aircraft operated were the Gavilán G358, OV-10A Bronco, IAI Arava, IAI Kfir, Cessna A-37 Dragonfly (12 retired June 2021)

== Aircraft identification ==
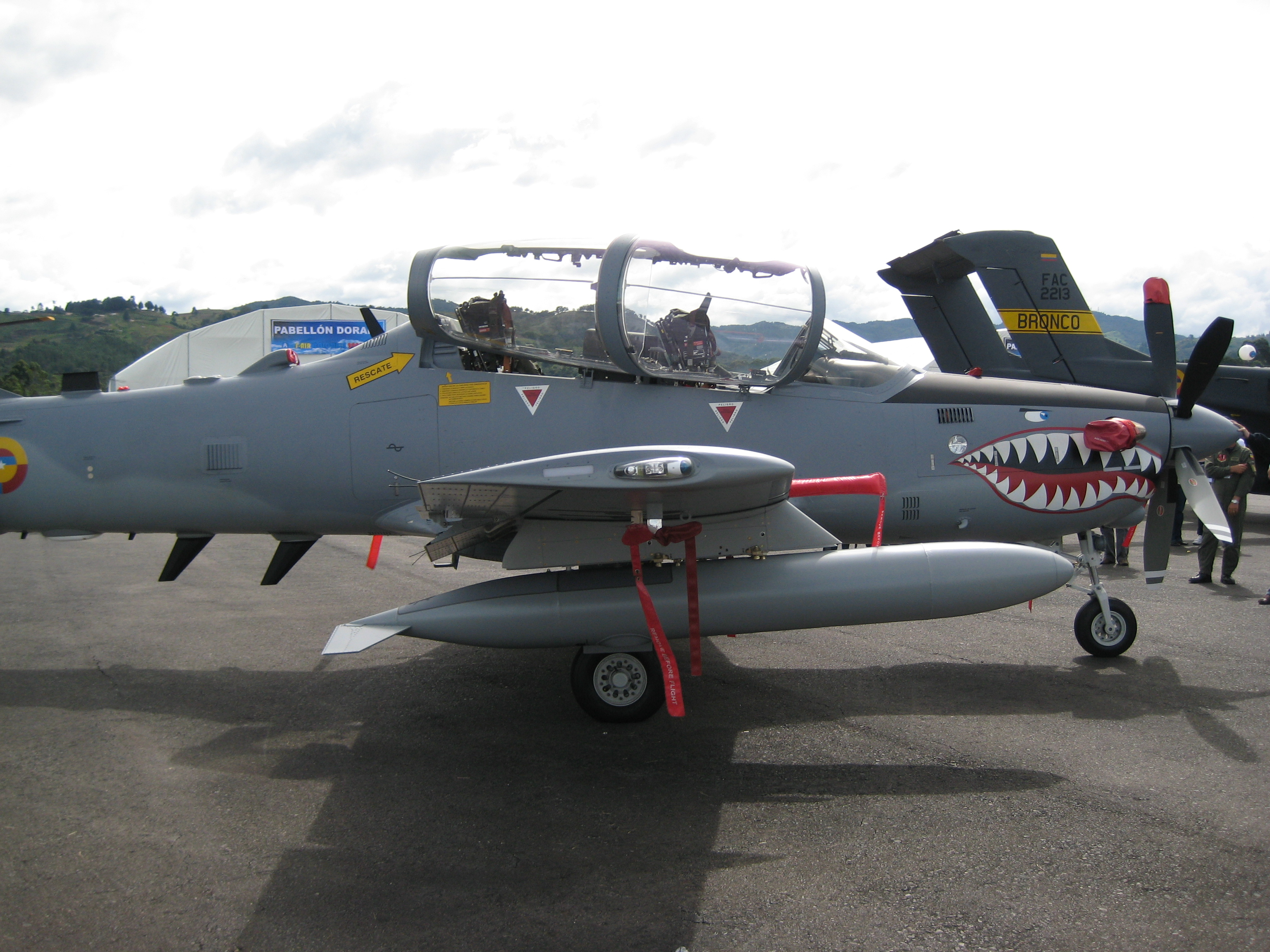
Super Tucano of the Colombian Aerospace Force. These aircraft were acquired in 2006

The aircraft used by the Colombian Aerospace Force are identified with the letters "FAC" followed by three or four numbers that are painted on the tail, nose and nose landing gear doors. The serial numbers are assigned according to the aircraft's primary role as follows:

- 001 Avión Presidencial
- 002 to 100 trainer
- 101 to 200 liaison
- 201 to 300 helicopter
- 301 to 500 miscellaneous
- 501 to 600 light transport
- 601 to 700 transport
- 701 to 800 advanced trainer
- 801 to 900 fighter-bomber
- 901 to 1000 crew-trainer
- 1001 to 1300 transport
- 2001 to 2300 Close support
- 2501 to 2600 bomber
- 3001 to 3100 Fighter
- 3101 to 3200 COIN
- 4001 to 4600 helicopter
- 5001 to 5600 liaison
- 5701 to 5800 recon/ELINT

== See also ==
- List of airports in Colombia
- Agrupación de Comandos Especiales Aéreos
