= Gavilán G358 =

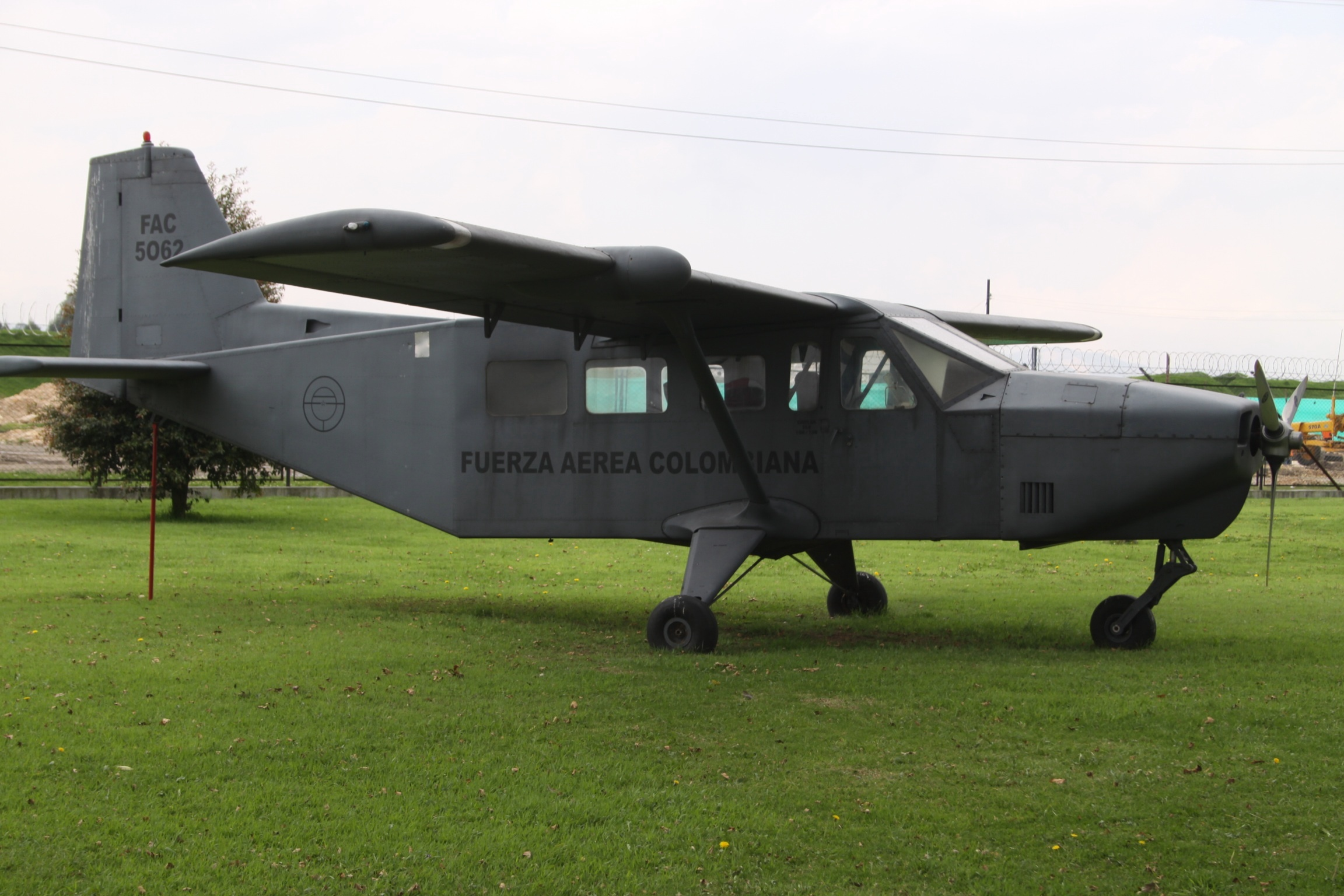
- Gavilán G358M Colombian Air Force

General information
- Type: Light transport aircraft
- Manufacturer: Gavilán S.A.
- Status: Active
- Primary users: Colombian Air Force Colombian National Army; National Police of Colombia

History
- First flight: 27 April 1990

The Gavilán 358 (English: Sparrow Hawk) is a Colombian light utility transport aircraft of the 1990s. A high-winged monoplane powered by a piston engine, small numbers of Gaviláns were produced in the late 1990s/early 2000s, some serving with the Colombian Air Force.

== Development and design ==
In 1952, Aero Mercantil of Bogotá, Colombia, became a dealer for Piper Aircraft, later selling a range of Piper aircraft assembled from kits by Aero Industrial Colombiana SA (AICSA), also in Bogotá. In 1986, it started development of a single-engined utility aircraft, suitable for production in Colombia.

The resultant design, the Gavilán, is a simple high-winged monoplane of all-metal construction. It has a boxlike, square-section fuselage that accommodates a pilot and up to seven passengers, with access through two doors on either side of the cockpit and a large cargo door on the left side of the fuselage. The passenger seats can be removed to allow carriage of cargo, including a full-sized coffin. It is fitted with a fixed tricycle undercarriage designed to withstand continued operations from rough South American airstrips. It is powered by a 350 hp (261 kW) Lycoming TIO-540-W2A engine, turbocharged to give sufficient power at Colombia's high altitudes.

The first prototype Gavilán made its first flight on 27 April 1990, testing resulting in lengthening of the forward fuselage and modifications to the wing. It was badly damaged in a crash landing due to engine failure in 1992, however, delaying certification and production, with the second prototype not flying until 29 May 1996. The Gavilán received its type certificate under US FAR part 23 regulations in May 1998.

In 2012, Cub Crafters bought from John Bryerton of GATS the Prototype.

== Operational history ==
Deliveries to customers started in 1998, with the first of twelve Gaviláns ordered by the Colombian Air Force being delivered on 25 June that year. El Gavilan SA, of Colombia, was pushing to sell 32 Gavilan 358's to the South African Air Force in April 1998. El Gavilán (as Aero Mercantil was renamed in 1992) had received orders for 19 aircraft by November 1999, but it is unclear whether all of these were built, with Flightglobal estimating in 2008 that only about twelve Gaviláns had been completed. At least four of the Colombian Air Force's Gaviláns were still in use in 2004. The Gavilán was retired in the Colombian Air Force in 2007.

== Variants ==
- G358 – standard version
  - G358M – Military version with weapons mountable in the rear doors in the gunship configuration.
- G508T – Turboprop-powered version with 500 hp turboprop, under development.
  - G508M – Military version of the turboprop version

== Operators ==
- Former Operators
- Colombia

- Colombian Air Force
- Colombian Navy
- Colombian National Police

== Specifications ==
Data from Brassey's World Aircraft & Systems Directory 1999/2000

General characteristics

- Crew: one
- Capacity: seven passengers or four stretchers or 444.5 kg (980 lb) cargo
- Length: 9.58 m (31 ft 5 in)
- Wingspan: 12.8 m (42 ft 0 in)
- Height: 3.74 m (12 ft 3 in)
- Wing area: 18.95 m^{2} (204.0 sq ft)
- Aspect ratio: 8.65:1
- Airfoil: NACA 4412
- Empty weight: 1,270 kg (2,800 lb)
- Max takeoff weight: 2,041 kg (4,500 lb)
- Fuel capacity: 447 L (118 US gal; 98 imp gal) usable
- Powerplant: 1 × Textron Lycoming TIO-540-W2A air-cooled flat-six piston engine, 260 kW (350 hp)
- Propellers: 3-bladed Hartzell, 2.13 m (7 ft 0 in) diameter

Performance

- Cruise speed: 250 km/h (160 mph, 130 kn) at 3,050 m (10,010 ft), 75% power
- Stall speed: 108 km/h (67 mph, 58 kn) (flaps down)
- Never exceed speed: 376 km/h (234 mph, 203 kn)
- Range: 1,425 km (885 mi, 769 nmi) at 75% power, 30 minutes reserve
- Service ceiling: 6,860 m (22,510 ft) (with altitude pack)
- Rate of climb: 4.50 m/s (885 ft/min)

== See also ==
Aircraft of comparable role, configuration, and era

- Cessna 206
- Cessna 208
- Gippsland GA8
- Quest Kodiak
- Technoavia SM92 Finist
