= Captain Ernesto Esguerra Cubides Air Base =

Captain Ernesto Esguerra Cubides Air Base Base Aérea Capitán Ernesto Esguerra Cubides
- IATA: TQS; ICAO: SKTQ

Summary
- Airport type: Military
- Operator: Colombian Aerospace Force
- Location: Tres Esquinas, Colombia
- Elevation AMSL: 178 m (584 ft)
- Coordinates: 0°44′45″N 75°14′02″W

Map
- Location of the airport in Colombia

Runways
Direction	Length		Surface
Direction	m	ft	Surface
07/25	1,896	6,220	Concrete
- Source: WAD GCM Google Maps

Captain Ernesto Esguerra Cubides Air Base (Spanish: Base Aérea Capitán Ernesto Esguerra Cubides) (IATA: TQS, ICAO: SKTQ), also known as Tres Esquinas Air Base, is a Colombian military base assigned to the Colombian Aerospace Force (Fuerza Aeroespacial Colombiana or FAC) Combat Air Command No. 6 (Comando Aéreo de Combate No. 6 or CACOM 6). The base is located at Tres Esquinas (English: Three Corners) in the Caquetá Department of Colombia. It is named in honor of Captain Ernesto Esguerra Cubides.

== Facilities ==
The air base resides at an elevation of 585 feet (178 m) above mean sea level. It has one runway designated 07/25 with a concrete surface measuring 6,220 by 79 feet (1,896 m × 24 m).

== See also ==
- Transport in Colombia
- List of airports in Colombia
