= Captain Germán Olano Moreno Air Base =

Captain Germán Olano Moreno Air Base Base Aérea Capitán Germán Olano Moreno
- IATA: PAL; ICAO: SKPQ

Summary
- Airport type: Military: Air Force Base
- Operator: Colombian Aerospace Force
- Location: Palanquero / Puerto Salgar, Colombia
- Built: August 27, 1933
- In use: 1933 - Present
- Commander: Brigadier General Alejandro Vélez Ospina
- Occupants: Comando Aéreo de Combate No. 1
- Elevation AMSL: 173 m (568 ft)
- Coordinates: 5°29′01″N 74°39′26″W
- Website: www.cacom1.mil.co

Map
- Location of the airport in Colombia

Runways
Direction	Length		Surface
Direction	m	ft	Surface
18/36	3,044	9,987	Asphalt
- Source: WAD GCM Google Maps

Captain Germán Olano Moreno Air Base (Spanish: Base Aérea Capitán Germán Olano Moreno) (IATA: PAL, ICAO: SKPQ) is a Colombian military base assigned to the Colombian Aerospace Force (Fuerza Aeroespacial Colombiana or FAC) Combat Air Command No. 1 (Comando Aéreo de Combate No. 1 or CACOM 1). The base is located in Palanquero, near Puerto Salgar, in the Cundinamarca department of Colombia. It is named in honor of Captain Germán Olano Moreno.

== Facilities ==
The air base resides at an elevation of 566 feet (173 m) above mean sea level. It has one runway designated 18/36 with an asphalt surface measuring 9,987 by 164 feet (3,044 m × 50 m).

== History ==
Officially inaugurated August 27, 1933 by the president of the republic Enrique Olaya Herrera, as the national airport of La Dorada.

In 1932, due to the conflict with Peru, the idea to create a base in a central strategic location was gaining hold. Back then the Hacienda Palanquero was already in use as an airport by the Colombian-German airline Scadta since 1919.

== Accidents and incidents ==
- On 31 December 2014, A Colombian Air Force IAI Kfir C10 combat aircraft from 111 Squadron of the 1st Combat Air Command (CACOM-1) crashed while undertaking a training mission over La Dorada in Caldas. The pilot ejected following a technical failure while on approach to the Palanquero airbase in Puerto Salgar, Cundinamarca.
- On 18 February 2009, Basler BT-67 FAC 1670 of the Colombian Air Force crashed near the base on a local training flight. All five crew were killed.
- On 15 May 2009, FAC 3031 Dassault Mirage 5 of the Colombian Air Force crashed above the 36 heading after a failed take-off. The pilot made the emergency procedures and ejected, leaving unharmed.

== See also ==
- Transport in Colombia
- List of airports in Colombia
