= Agrupación de Comandos Especiales Aéreos =

Unit of the Colombian Aerospace Force

The Agrupación de Comandos Especiales Aéreos formerly known as Grupo Anti-Secuestro de Aviones (Airborne Counter-Hijacking Group, GASDA) is an elite unit of the Colombian Aerospace Force, although it is under the operational command of the CIAES (Centro de Información Anti-Extorsión y Secuestros).

The unit's task is to counter terrorist and criminal activity at all of Colombia's airports; it is located at Madrid Air Base, outside Bogotá. ACOES had an estimated strength of between 60 and 90 men, organized into 25-man sections. Each of these sections had three assault teams, a security team and a support element. Members were volunteers drawn from Air Force security units; most are airborne qualified, whilst all have passed the Colombian Army's rigorous Lancero course.

There are two types of missions undertaken by the ACOEA. One is intervention during airplane hostage situations, and the other is Combat Search and Rescue (CSAR) missions.
