= Major Justino Mariño Cuesto Air Base =

Military airbase in Madrid, Colombia

Major Justino Mariño Cuesto Air Base Base Aérea Mayor Justino Mariño Cuesto
- IATA: none; ICAO: SKMA

Summary
- Airport type: Military
- Operator: Colombian Aerospace Force
- Location: Madrid, Colombia
- Elevation AMSL: 2,537 m (8,323 ft)
- Coordinates: 4°43′40″N 74°16′31″W

Map
- Location of the airport in Colombia

Runways
Direction	Length		Surface
Direction	m	ft	Surface
06/24	1,850	6,070	Asphalt
- Source: DAFIF GCM Google Maps

Major Justino Mariño Cuesto Air Base (Spanish: Base Aérea Mayor Justino Mariño Cuesto) (ICAO: SKMA) is a Colombian military base assigned to the Colombian Aerospace Force (Fuerza Aeroespacial Colombiana or FAC) Maintenance Air Command (Comando Aéreo de Mantenimiento or CAMAN). The base is located in Madrid, a municipality in the Cundinamarca department of Colombia. It is named in honor of Major Justino Mariño Cuesto.

== Facilities ==
The air base resides at an elevation of 8,325 feet (2,537 m) above mean sea level. It has one runway designated 06/24 with an asphalt surface measuring 6,070 by 80 feet (1,850 m × 24 m).

== See also ==
- Transport in Colombia
- List of airports in Colombia
