= Military Transport Air Command (Colombian Air Force) =

Columbian military airfield

Coordinates: 4.7033°N 74.1511°W

Military Transportation Air Command (Spanish: Comando Aéreo de Transporte Militar, CATAM) is a major military airfield for the use of the Colombian Aerospace Force. It is located in the outskirts of Bogotá within the vicinity of El Dorado International Airport. CATAM commemorated the 60th anniversary of its founding in 2023.
