= Puerto Salgar =

- Municipality and town
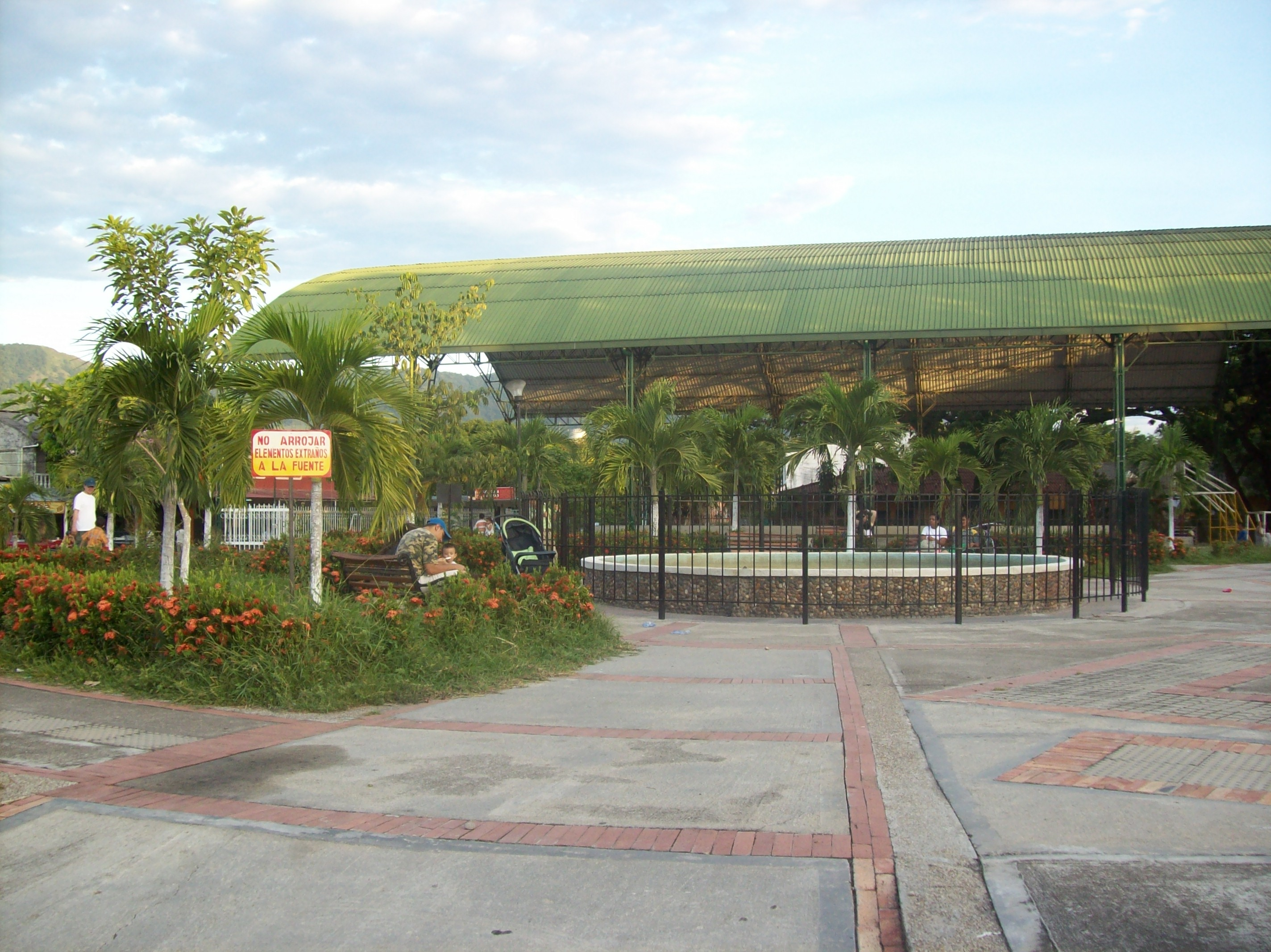
- Sportscenter of Puerto Salgar

- Flag Seal

- Location of the municipality and town inside Cundinamarca Department of Colombia

- Location in Colombia
- Coordinates: 5°30′N 74°35′W
- Country: Colombia
- Department: Cundinamarca

Area
  - Municipality and town: 515.9 km^{2} (199.2 sq mi)
  - Urban: 1.98 km^{2} (0.76 sq mi)

Population (Census 2018)
  - Municipality and town: 15,019
  - Density: 29.11/km^{2} (75.40/sq mi)
  - Urban: 11,082
  - Urban density: 5,600/km^{2} (14,500/sq mi)
- Time zone: UTC-5 (Colombia Standard Time)

Puerto Salgar (Spanish pronunciation: [ˈpweɾto salˈɣaɾ]) is a municipality and town of Colombia in the northwestern part of the department of Cundinamarca. It came to international attention when the US ambassador in Colombia announced the Palanquero Air Base had entered a recertification process, possibly in order to host US military personnel as a replacement to the Manta Air Base. As of July 2009, negotiations were ongoing.

On 29 December 2015, Puerto Salgar recorded a temperature of 45.0 °C (113.0 °F), which is the highest temperature to have ever been recorded in Colombia.

== Climate ==
Climate data for Puerto Salgar (Captain Germán Olano Moreno Air Base), elevation 172 m (564 ft), (1981–2010)
Month	Jan	Feb	Mar	Apr	May	Jun	Jul	Aug	Sep	Oct	Nov	Dec	Year
Mean daily maximum °C (°F)	33.1 (91.6)	33.6 (92.5)	33.4 (92.1)	33.0 (91.4)	33.2 (91.8)	33.7 (92.7)	34.9 (94.8)	35.2 (95.4)	34.2 (93.6)	32.5 (90.5)	32.2 (90.0)	32.5 (90.5)	33.4 (92.1)
Daily mean °C (°F)	28.6 (83.5)	28.9 (84.0)	28.7 (83.7)	28.5 (83.3)	28.7 (83.7)	28.9 (84.0)	29.4 (84.9)	29.7 (85.5)	28.8 (83.8)	28.0 (82.4)	28.0 (82.4)	28.3 (82.9)	28.7 (83.7)
Mean daily minimum °C (°F)	22.6 (72.7)	22.2 (72.0)	22.4 (72.3)	22.6 (72.7)	22.6 (72.7)	22.5 (72.5)	22.5 (72.5)	22.6 (72.7)	22.5 (72.5)	22.1 (71.8)	22.3 (72.1)	22.5 (72.5)	22.4 (72.3)
Average precipitation mm (inches)	86.2 (3.39)	92.1 (3.63)	143.6 (5.65)	232.7 (9.16)	232.8 (9.17)	106.3 (4.19)	82.9 (3.26)	98.5 (3.88)	182.5 (7.19)	296.0 (11.65)	247.5 (9.74)	147.8 (5.82)	1,948.7 (76.72)
Average precipitation days	9	8	13	17	17	13	11	11	16	19	18	12	155
Average relative humidity (%)	73	71	73	75	74	72	66	66	71	76	77	76	73
Mean monthly sunshine hours	139.5	112.9	117.8	138.0	161.2	156.0	189.1	186.0	162.0	155.0	150.0	139.5	1,807
Mean daily sunshine hours	4.5	4.0	3.8	4.6	5.2	5.2	6.1	6.0	5.4	5.0	5.0	4.5	4.9
Source: Instituto de Hidrologia Meteorologia y Estudios Ambientales
