= Melgar, Tolima =

Melgar
- Municipality and town
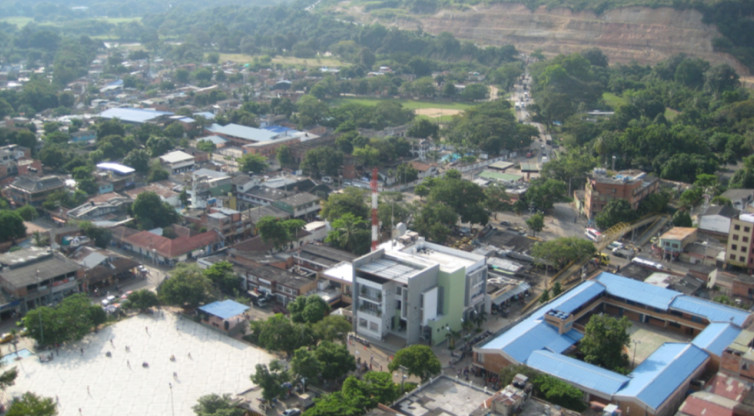

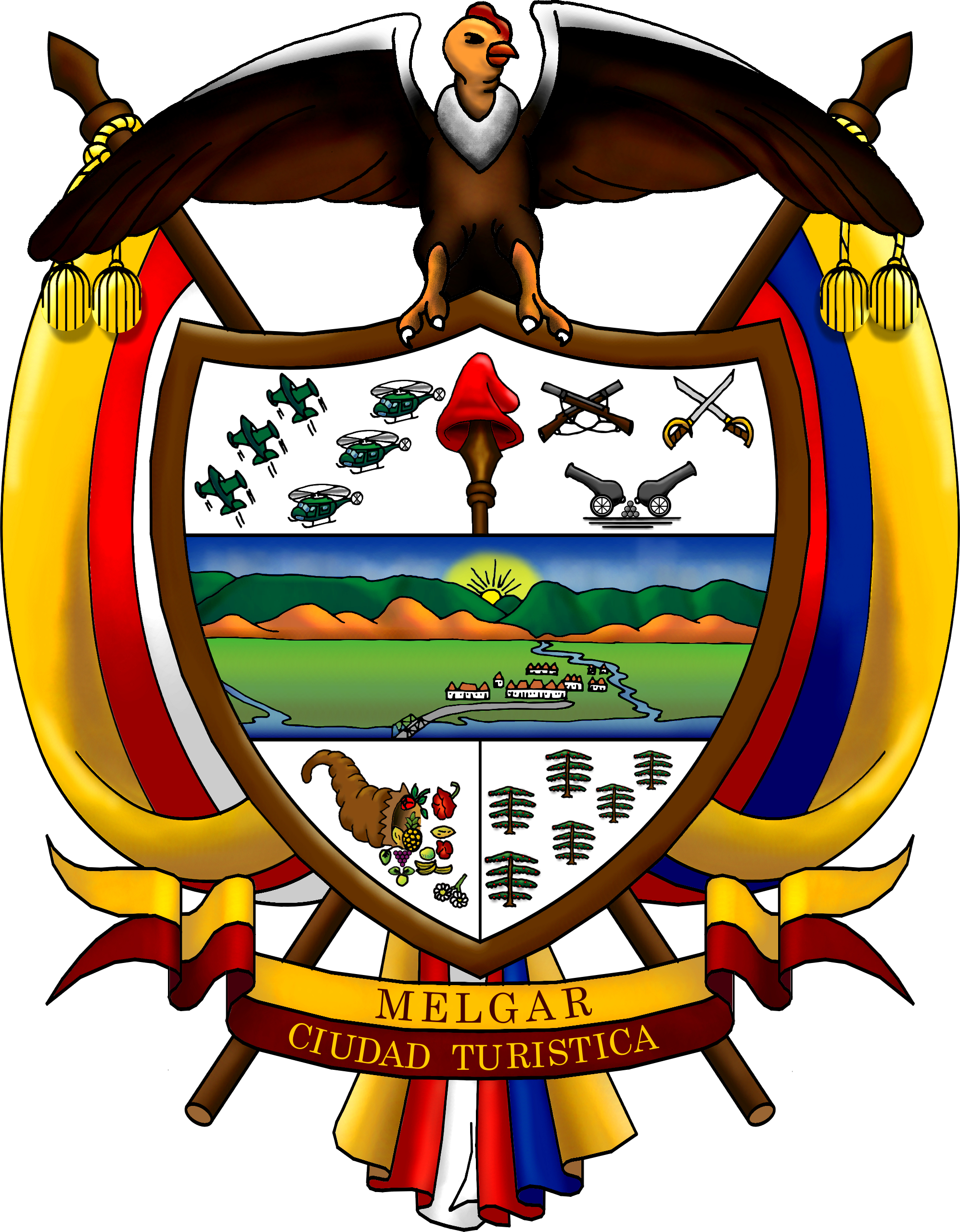
- Flag Coat of arms

- Localities (localidades) of Tolima
- Coordinates: 4°12′14″N 74°38′34″W
- Country: Colombia
- Department: Tolima

Government
  - Mayor: Agustín Manrique Galeano

Area
  - Municipality and town: 202.2 km^{2} (78.1 sq mi)
  - Urban: 13.92 km^{2} (5.37 sq mi)
- Elevation: 323 m (1,060 ft)

Population (2018 census)
  - Municipality and town: 36,536
  - Density: 180.7/km^{2} (468.0/sq mi)
  - Urban: 29,749
  - Urban density: 2,137/km^{2} (5,535/sq mi)
- Time zone: UTC-5
- Website: City Official Site

Melgar (Spanish pronunciation: [melˈɣaɾ]) is a Colombian municipality and town in the Department of Tolima, 98 km (61 mi) southwest of Bogotá and 1 hour east of Ibagué, the capital city of Tolima.

Melgar is located in the Sumapaz River Valley and borders the Department of Cundinamarca and Sumapaz River to the north, town of Icononzo to the east, the towns of Cunday at the south and Carmen de Apicala to the west.

The town is home to a major military base called Tolemaida Air Base.

Melgar is a very popular weekend destination for Bogota residents. Temperature ranges between 28 and 35 °C (82 and 95 °F). It is known in Colombia as the "City of the Swimming Pools" or the "Sea of Swimming Pools" because of its more than 5,000 swimming pools. It is a major inland resort, which the people of Bogotá visit on weekends to flee the capital's cold weather for the warm climate of the valley.

== History ==
The first settlement was called "Cualamana", later changed to "Villa de Nuestra Señora de Altagracia. In 1601 its name was changed to "La Candelaria", given by Captain Juan Lopez de Herrera. It was the site of an ancient Amerindian village that belonged to the Panches.

In the early 18th century the village was destroyed by a fire when the local religious celebrations were taking place. The village was rebuilt in 1789 by the Dominican community in the grounds owned by Cardenas Varastegui at the valley of the Sumapaz River. In the early days the place was called "Valle de Melgar". In 1824, the village was part of the Department of Cundinamarca, together with Tibacuy, Pasca, Pandi and Cunday. In 1851 the population was approximately 2,600 people and the economy was based on the production of quina.

In 1855, it became part of the Province of Neiva, together with Cunday and Carmen de Apicalá. By then, Melgar was also producing coffee. By decree issued on November 13, 1871 Melgar was elevated to the status of town. Melgar became part of the Department of Tolima after its creation.

== Climate ==
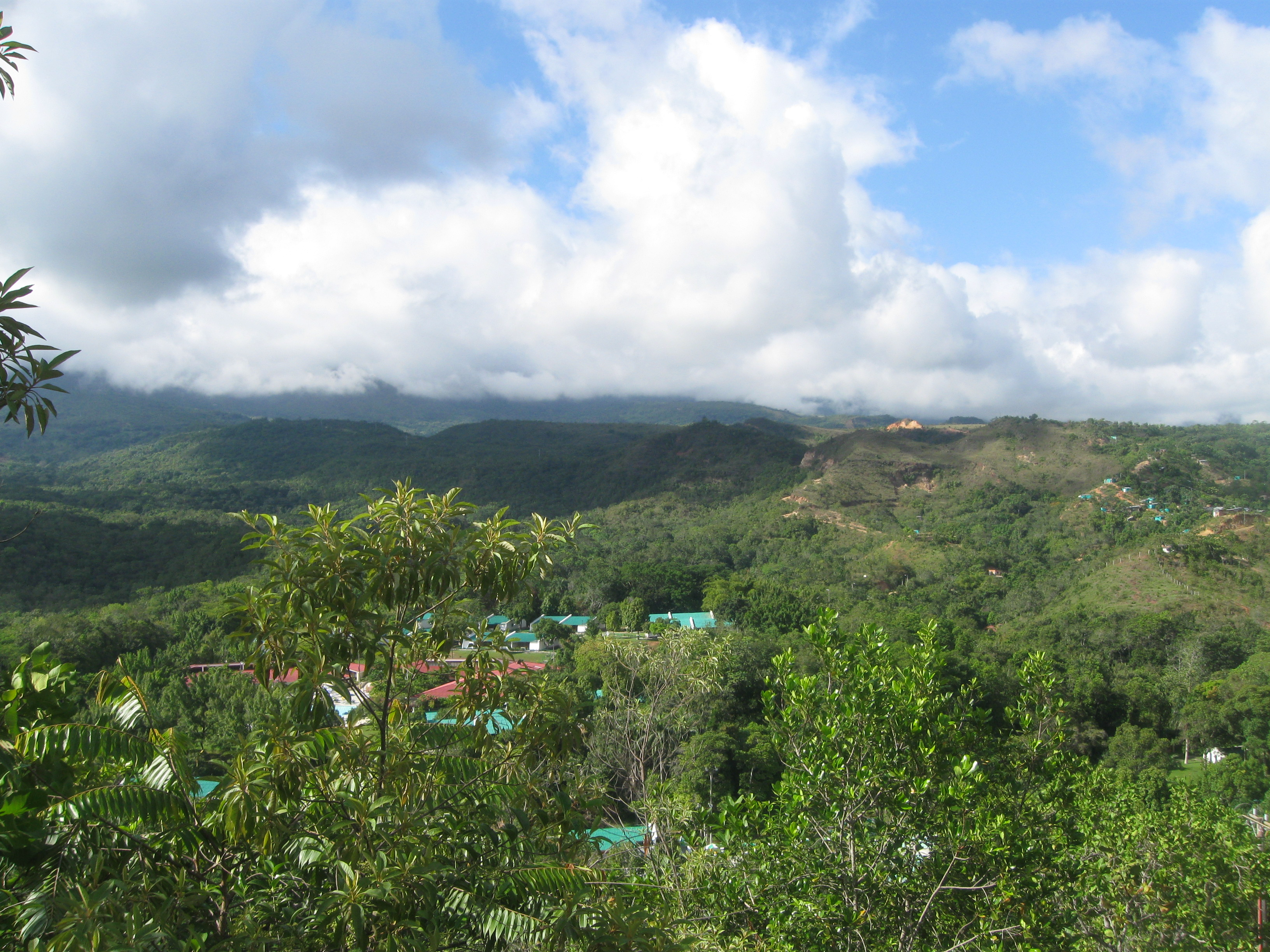
View of Melgar from Cafam Resort

The Köppen Climate Classification subtype for this climate is "Am". (Tropical Monsoon Climate), which is relatively rare.

Climate data for Melgar (Base Aerea Melgar), elevation 319 m (1,047 ft), (1981–2010)
Month	Jan	Feb	Mar	Apr	May	Jun	Jul	Aug	Sep	Oct	Nov	Dec	Year
Mean daily maximum °C (°F)	33.9 (93.0)	34.5 (94.1)	33.2 (91.8)	32.5 (90.5)	32.7 (90.9)	32.8 (91.0)	33.7 (92.7)	34.8 (94.6)	34.6 (94.3)	33.2 (91.8)	32.8 (91.0)	33.4 (92.1)	33.5 (92.3)
Daily mean °C (°F)	28.2 (82.8)	28.4 (83.1)	27.9 (82.2)	27.6 (81.7)	27.5 (81.5)	27.4 (81.3)	27.9 (82.2)	28.5 (83.3)	28.4 (83.1)	27.9 (82.2)	27.6 (81.7)	27.8 (82.0)	27.9 (82.2)
Mean daily minimum °C (°F)	20.8 (69.4)	20.9 (69.6)	21.3 (70.3)	21.4 (70.5)	21.3 (70.3)	20.7 (69.3)	20.1 (68.2)	20.4 (68.7)	20.8 (69.4)	21.1 (70.0)	21.3 (70.3)	21.2 (70.2)	21.0 (69.8)
Average precipitation mm (inches)	94.2 (3.71)	108.1 (4.26)	152.9 (6.02)	148.3 (5.84)	178.6 (7.03)	91.8 (3.61)	35.6 (1.40)	35.2 (1.39)	86.8 (3.42)	209.2 (8.24)	170.9 (6.73)	127.5 (5.02)	1,383.4 (54.46)
Average precipitation days	8	10	11	13	14	11	8	7	10	15	14	11	126
Average relative humidity (%)	71	71	73	75	76	75	70	64	67	72	75	72	72
Source: Instituto de Hidrologia Meteorologia y Estudios Ambientales
