= Camilo Daza =

Colombian aviator (1898–1975)

Camilo Daza Álvarez
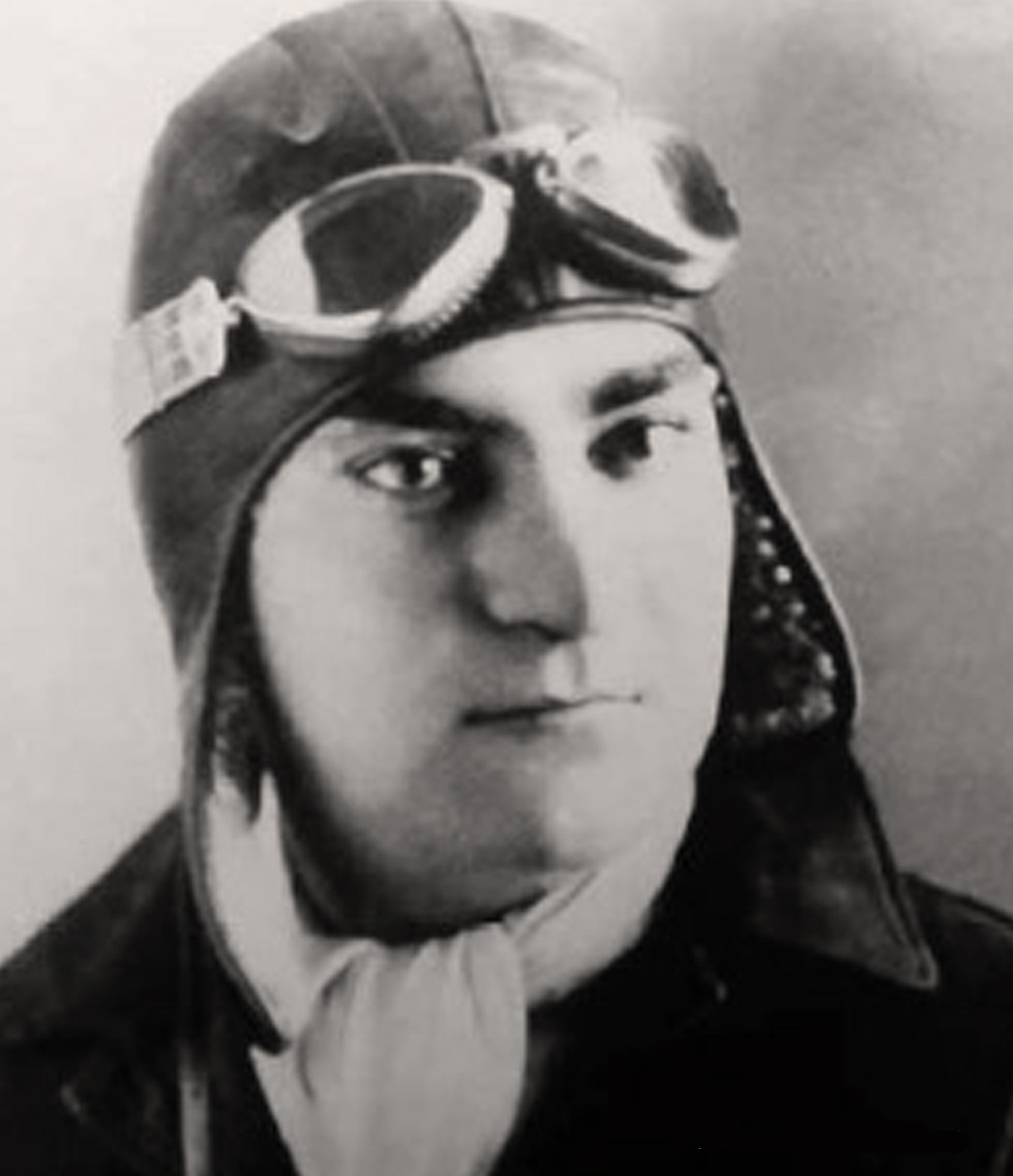
- Born: June 25, 1898; Pamplona, Colombia
- Died: March 18, 1975 (aged 76); Bogotá, Colombia
- Occupation(s): Pilot; founder of the Colombian Air Force

Camilo Daza Álvarez (June 25, 1898 – March 18, 1975) was a Colombian aviator. He was born in Pamplona, Colombia. In 1919, he became the first Colombian to pilot an airplane, and is considered to be the founder of Colombian aviation. He held the rank of brigadier general in the Colombian Air Force (Spanish: Fuerza Aérea Colombiana).

The Camilo Daza International Airport in Cúcuta is named after him, and displays a statue honoring his contributions. Also, the air base serving Comando Aéreo de Transporte Militar (CATAM) is named in his honor.

== Early life ==
Camilo Daza was born on June 25, 1898, and spent his childhood in Pamplona, Colombia. At the age of 8, he showed interest in aviation and attempted to fly by jumping off the roof of his father's hacienda, La Caldera, using a rack from a window. The fall resulted in him fracturing both arms, hurting his nose, getting a scar, and being unconscious for a week. Camilo also had a talent for mechanical artifacts and built a steamboat at the age of 13, which his neighbours admired as he navigated the waters near his home.

== Camilo's time in Spain ==
Camilo's parents sent him to the Industrial School of Tarraza near Barcelona, Spain. There, he learned about aviation and became interested in it. He discovered that a pilot had crossed the English Channel and met a Spanish pilot named Salvador Elila. Despite his parents' disapproval, Camilo continued to study and work to save money. In 1919, he became the first Colombian to fly an airplane and in March 1920, he received his pilot and aviation mechanic diploma from Curtis. He later acquired an airplane named "SANTANDER" and flew it over Cúcuta on September 2, 1922. Cúcuta is also known for having the best railway, the first telephone company "Polanco", the first FORD automobile brought to the city by Italian Enrique Raffo, and the installation of the wireless tower and the first messages transmitted to Europe.

== First aviation company ==
The first aviation company in Colombia was the Compañía Nortesantandereana de Aviación, which was established in Norte de Santander. The company was founded by fifty shareholders, including Camilo's relatives, admirers, and friends. Camilo traveled to Spain with his copilot Joaquín Cayón to purchase an airplane with a license from the French factory Cuadron with an eighty-horsepower Slamson engine. After testing the machine and learning how it worked, Camilo disassembled the airplane and packed it in wooden boxes to be shipped to Curazao. He intended to assemble the plane in Curazao and fly it directly to Cúcuta with a stopover in Maracaibo, Venezuela. After assembling and exhibiting the plane in Curazao, he declared that it would be the first commercial airplane in Colombia. However, there were difficulties in the supply chain after the flight exhibition on the island.

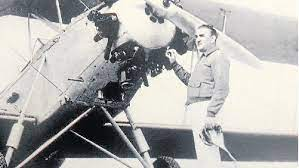

== Personal life ==
Camilo Daza married Genoveva Mojica in Bucaramanga on March 27, 1926. They had a total of seven children, three boys and four girls. One of the girls died in Spain. The two older boys, Alvaro and Guillermo, pursued aviation with the same passion, with Guillermo serving as a navigator in the Atlantic for cases where Avianca had to rely on the sea.
