= Marco Fidel Suárez Air Base =

Marco Fidel Suárez Air Base Base Aérea Marco Fidel Suárez
- IATA: none; ICAO: SKGB

Summary
- Airport type: Military
- Operator: Colombian Aerospace Force
- Location: Cali, Colombia
- Elevation AMSL: 965 m (3,166 ft)
- Coordinates: 3°27′32″N 76°29′47″W

Map
- Location of the airport in Colombia

Runways
Direction	Length		Surface
Direction	m	ft	Surface
06/24	1,900	6,233	Asphalt
- Source: WAD GCM Google Maps

Marco Fidel Suárez Air Base (Spanish: Base Aérea Marco Fidel Suárez) (ICAO: SKGB) is a Colombian military base assigned to the Colombian Aerospace Force (Fuerza Aeroespacial Colombiana or FAC) Military Aviation School (Escuela Militar de Aviación or EMAVI). The base is located in Cali (also known as Santiago de Cali), a city in the Valle del Cauca department of Colombia. It is named for Marco Fidel Suárez, a former president of Colombia.

== Facilities ==
The airport resides at an elevation of 3,165 feet (965 m) above mean sea level. It has one runway designated 07/25 with an asphalt surface measuring 6,233 by 98 feet (1,900 m × 30 m).

== See also ==
- Transport in Colombia
- List of airports in Colombia
