= List of airports in Bolivia =

This is a list of airports in Bolivia, grouped by type and sorted by location.

== Airports ==
Airport names shown in bold indicate the airport has scheduled service on commercial airlines.

| City served / Location | Province | Department | ICAO | IATA | Airport name | Altitude | |
| City served / Location | Province | Department | ICAO | IATA | Airport name | m | ft |
|---|---|---|---|---|---|---|---|
**Controlled airports**
| Apolo | Franz Tamayo | La Paz | SLAP | APB | Apolo Airport | | |
| Ascención de Guarayos | Guarayos | Santa Cruz | SLAS | ASC | Ascención de Guarayos Airport | | |
| Bermejo | Aniceto Arce | Tarija | SLBJ | BJO | Bermejo Airport | | |
| Camiri | Cordillera | Santa Cruz | SLCA | CAM | Camiri Airport | | |
| Charaña | Pacajes | La Paz | SLCN | | Charaña Airport | | |
| Cobija | Nicolás Suárez | Pando | SLCO | CIJ | **Cap. Anibal Arab Airport** | 272 | 892 |
| Cochabamba | Cercado | Cochabamba | SLCB | CBB | **Jorge Wilstermann International Airport** | 2,548 | 8,360 |
| Concepción | Ñuflo de Chávez | Santa Cruz | SLCP | CEP | Concepción Airport | | |
| Copacabana | Manco Kapac | La Paz | SLCC | | Copacabana Airport | | |
| Guayaramerín | Vaca Díez | Beni | SLGM | GYA | **Guayaramerín Airport** | | |
| La Paz / El Alto | Pedro Domingo Murillo | La Paz | SLLP | LPB | **El Alto International Airport** | 4,061 | 13,323 |
| Magdalena | Iténez | Beni | SLMG | MGD | Magdalena Airport | | |
| Monteagudo | Hernando Siles | Chuquisaca | SLAG | MHW | Monteagudo Airport | | |
| Oruro | Cercado | Oruro | SLOR | ORU | **Juan Mendoza Airport** | | |
| Potosí | Tomás Frías | Potosí | SLPO | POI | **Cap. Nicolas Rojas Airport** | | |
| Puerto Suárez | Germán Busch | Santa Cruz | SLPS | PSZ | Puerto Suárez International Airport | 134 | 440 |
| Reyes | José Ballivián | Beni | SLRY | REY | Reyes Airport | | |
| Riberalta | Vaca Díez | Beni | SLRI | RIB | **Riberalta Airport** | 141 | 463 |
| Roboré | Chiquitos | Santa Cruz | SLRB | RBO | Roboré Airport | | |
| Rurrenabaque | José Ballivián | Beni | SLRQ | RBQ | **Rurrenabaque Airport** | 206 | 676 |
| San Borja | José Ballivián | Beni | SLSB | SRJ | Cap. Av. Germán Quiroga Guardia Airport | 193 | 633 |
| San Ignacio de Moxos | Moxos | Beni | SLSM | SNM | San Ignacio de Moxos Airport | | |
| San Ignacio de Velasco | Velasco | Santa Cruz | SLSI | SNG | Capitán Av. Juan Cochamanidis Airport | | |
| San Javier | Ñuflo de Chávez | Santa Cruz | SLJV | SJV | San Javier Airport | | |
| San Joaquín | Mamoré | Beni | SLJO | SJB | San Joaquín Airport | | |
| San José de Chiquitos | Chiquitos | Santa Cruz | SLJE | SJS | San José de Chiquitos Airport | | |
| San Matías | Ángel Sandoval | Santa Cruz | SLTI | MQK | San Matías Airport | | |
| San Ramón | Mamoré | Beni | SLRA | SRD | San Ramón Airport | | |
| Santa Ana del Yacuma | Yacuma | Beni | SLSA | SBL | Santa Ana del Yacuma Airport | 144 | 472 |
| Santa Cruz de la Sierra | Andrés Ibáñez | Santa Cruz | SLVR | VVI | **Viru Viru International Airport** | 373 | 1,224 |
| Santa Cruz de la Sierra | Andrés Ibáñez | Santa Cruz | SLET | SRZ | El Trompillo Airport | 418 | 1,371 |
| Sucre | Oropeza | Chuquisaca | SLSU | SRE | Juana Azurduy de Padilla International Airport Closed | | |
| Sucre | Yamparáez | Chuquisaca | SLAL | SRE | **Alcantari Airport** | 3,104 | 10,184 |
| Tarija | Cercado | Tarija | SLTJ | TJA | **Cap. Oriel Lea Plaza Airport** | 1,853 | 6,079 |
| Trinidad | Cercado | Beni | SLTR | TDD | **Tte. Av. Jorge Henrich Arauz Airport** | 155 | 509 |
| Vallegrande | Vallegrande | Santa Cruz | SLVG | VAH | Cap. Av. Vidal Villagomez Toledo Airport | | |
| Villamontes | Gran Chaco | Tarija | SLVM | VLM | Tcnl. Rafael Pabón Airport | | |
| Yacuiba | Gran Chaco | Tarija | SLYA | BYC | **Yacuiba Airport** | 645 | 2,116 |
**Uncontrolled airports**
| Abapo | Cordillera | Santa Cruz | SLAB | | Abapo Airport Closed | | |
| Aiquile | Campero | Cochabamba | SLAQ | | Aiquile Airport | | |
| Angora | José Ballivián | Beni | SLAN | | Angora Airport | | |
| Arampampa | Bernardino Bilbao | Potosí | SLAM | | Arampampa Airport | | |
| Basilio | | Santa Cruz | SLGF | | Gulf Airport | | |
| Baures | Iténez | Beni | SLBA | BVL | Baures Airport | | |
| Bella Union | Mamoré | Beni | SLBN | | Bella Union Airport | | |
| Bella Vista | Iténez | Beni | SLIR | | Irobi Airport | | |
| Blanca Flor | Madre de Dios | Pando | SLBF | | Blanca Flor Airport | | |
| Buen Retiro | Iténez | Beni | SLBR | | Buen Retiro Airport | | |
| Buen Retiro Ballivian | José Ballivián | Beni | SLBT | | Buen Retiro Ballivian Airport | | |
| Buena Hora | José Ballivián | Beni | SLBH | | Buena Hora Airport | | |
| Bulo Bulo | Carrasco | Cochabamba | SLBB | | Bulo Bulo Airport | | |
| Cabezas | | Santa Cruz | SLCE | | Cabezas Airport | | |
| Choreti | Mamoré | Beni | SLCT | | Choreti Airport | | |
| Cachascani | Iténez | Beni | SLHA | | Cachascani Airport | | |
| Camiare | Yacuma | Beni | SLCM | | Camiare Airport | | |
| Estación San Antonio de Parapeti (de) | | Santa Cruz | SLCD | | Cañada Airport | | |
| Cañada Larga | Chiquitos | Santa Cruz | SLNL | | Cañada Larga Airport | | |
| Caranavi | Nor Yungas | La Paz | SLVI | | Caranavi Airport | | |
| Caranda | Ichilo | Santa Cruz | SLDA | | Caranda Airport | | |
| Cerdas | Nor Lípez | Potosí | SLCS | | Cerdas Airport | | |
| Challapata | Abaroa | Oruro | SLCL | | Challapata Airport | | |
| Charagua | Cordillera | Santa Cruz | SLCG | | Charagua Airport | | |
| Chimoré | Chapare | Cochabamba | SLCH | | Chimoré Airport | | |
| Chiquitos | | Santa Cruz | SLTC | | Tres Cruces Airport | | |
| Coquinal | José Ballivián | Beni | SLQN | | Coquinal Airport | | |
| Covendo | Sud Yungas | La Paz | SLVD | | Covendo Airport | | |
| Cuevo | Cordillera | Santa Cruz | SLUC | | Cuevo Airport Closed | | |
| Culpina | Sud Cinti | Chuquisaca | SLCU | | Culpina Airport | | |
| El Cairo | Yacuma | Beni | SLEC | | El Cairo Airport | | |
| El Cielo | Moxos | Beni | SLCI | | Caigua Airport | | |
| El Cocal | | Beni | SLEA | | El Cocal Airport | | |
| El Condor | Gran Chaco | Tarija | SLEK | | El Condor Airport Closed | | |
| El Desengaño | Yacuma | Beni | SLDN | | El Desengaño Airport | | |
| El Dorado | Iturralde | La Paz | SLED | | El Dorado Airport | | |
| El Escondido | Gran Chaco | Tarija | SLEE | | El Escondido Airport Closed | | |
| El Paraíso | Yacuma | Beni | SLEO | | El Paraíso Airport | | |
| El Peru del Apere | Yacuma | Beni | SLEP | | El Peru del Apere Airport | | |
| El Peru del Apere | Yacuma | Beni | SLSD | | San Carlos Gutierrez Airport | | |
| El Porvenir Sur | Luis Calvo | Chuquisaca | SLPW | | El Porvenir Sur Airport | | |
| El Rancho | | Beni | SLEH | | El Rancho Airport | | |
| El Remate | | Santa Cruz | SLRE | | El Remate Airport | | |
| El Salvador | José Ballivián | Beni | SLEV | | El Salvador Airport | | |
| El Triunfo | Marbán | Beni | SLEF | | El Triunfo Airport | | |
| San Isidro del Espino | Cordillera | Santa Cruz | SLEI | | Espino Airport Closed | | |
| Espiritu, Bolivia | Yacuma | Beni | SLES | | Espiritu Airport | | |
| Fatima | José Ballivián | Beni | SLFA | | Fatima Airport | | |
| Flor de Oro | | Santa Cruz | SLFO | | Flor de Oro Airport | | |
| Florencia | Moxos | Beni | SLFR | | Florencia Airport | | |
| Guirapembi | Cordillera | Santa Cruz | SLGP | | Guirapembi Airport - Closed | | |
| Huacaraje | Iténez | Beni | SLHJ | BVK | Huacaraje Airport | | |
| Huacareta | | Chuquisaca | SLHC | | Huacareta Airport | | |
| Inglaterra | José Ballivián | Beni | SLIG | | Inglaterra Airport | | |
| Itaguazurenda | Cordillera | Santa Cruz | SLIT | | Itaguazurenda Airport | | |
| Ixiamas | Iturralde | La Paz | SLIX | | Ixiamas Airport | | |
| Izozog | Cordillera | Santa Cruz | SLIZ | | Izozog Airport | | |
| Jatata | | Pando | SLJA | | Jatata Airport | | |
| Josuani | Yacuma | Beni | SLJS | | Josuani Airport | | |
| Las Brizas | | Beni | SLLB | | Las Brizas Airport | | |
| La Esperanza | Moxos | Beni | SLEZ | | La Esperanza Airport | | |
| La Habana | Cercado | Beni | SLHB | | La Habana Airport | | |
| La India | José Ballivián | Beni | SLLI | | La India Airport | | |
| La Joya | | Oruro | SLIY | | Intiraymi Airport | | |
| La Vertiente | | Tarija | SLVT | | La Vertiente Airport | | |
| Lago Huachi | Iténez | Beni | SLLH | | Lago Huachi Airport | | |
| Laguna Colorada | Sud Lípez | Potosí | SLLC | | Laguna Colorada Airport | | |
| Laguna Loa | José Ballivián | Beni | SLLL | | Laguna Loa Airport | | |
| Laguna Portia | Iténez | Beni | SLZJ | | San Pedro del Rio Blanco Airport | | |
| Las Juntas | | Santa Cruz | SLYG | | Yabog Airport | | |
| Manuripi | | Pando | SLMN | | Manuripi Airport | | |
| Mizque | | Cochabamba | SLMZ | | Mizque Airport | | |
| Moira | Velasco | Santa Cruz | SLFL | | Florida Airport | | |
| Monte Verde | | Santa Cruz | SLMV | | Monte Verde Airport | | |
| Nieve | Yacuma | Beni | SLNV | | Nieve Airport | | |
| Nuevo Mundo | Yacuma | Beni | SLNO | | Nuevo Mundo Airport | | |
| Padilla | Tomina | Chuquisaca | SLPL | | Padilla Airport | | |
| Palmira | Yacuma | Beni | SLPM | | Palmira Airport | | |
| Parapeti | | Santa Cruz | SLHS | | Chacobos Airport Closed | | |
| Piso Firme | | Santa Cruz | SLPF | | Piso Firme Airport | | |
| Pitai | | Beni | SLPI | | Pitai Airport | | |
| Porvenir | | Santa Cruz | SLPN | | Porvenir Velasco Airport | | |
| Progreso | | Beni | SLPG | | Progreso Airport | | |
| Puerto America | Manuripi | Pando | SLPU | | Puerto America Airport | | |
| Puerto Cavinas | José Ballivián | Beni | SLCV | | Cavinas Airport | | |
| Puerto Heath | Iturralde | La Paz | SLKH | | Puerto Heath Airport | | |
| Puerto Rico | Manuripi | Pando | SLPR | PUR | Puerto Rico Airport | | |
| Rancho Alegre | | Beni | SLRH | | Rancho Alegre Airport | | |
| Refugio | | Santa Cruz | SLRF | | Refugio Airport | | |
| Retiro | Yacuma | Beni | SLRR | | Retiro Airport | | |
| Rincon del Tigre | Germán Busch | Santa Cruz | SLRX | | Rincon del Tigre Airport | | |
| Rosal | Yacuma | Beni | SLRL | | Rosal Airport | | |
| Samaipata | Florida | Santa Cruz | SLIP | | Samaipata Airport | | |
| Naciff | Yacuma | Beni | SLZF | | San Francisco Naciff Airport | | |
| San Juan | Cercado | Beni | SLJN | | San Juan Airport | | |
| San Lorenzo de Moxos | Moxos | Beni | SLLZ | | San Lorenzo Airport | | |
| San Miguel de Velasco | José Miguel de Velasco | Santa Cruz | SLKQ | | San Miguel South Airport | | |
| San Pedro Salvatierra | Moxos | Beni | SLZB | | San Pedro Salvatierra Airport | | |
| San Vicente | | Santa Cruz | SLZV | | San Vicente Airport | | |
| Santa Ana de Mosetenes | Sud Yungas | La Paz | SLSH | | Santa Ana de Huachi Airport | | |
| Santa Catalina | Moxos | Beni | SLIN | | Santa Catalina Airport | | |
| Santa Rita | Yacuma | Beni | SLRT | | Santa Rita Airport | | |
| Santa Rosa | Yacuma | Beni | SLSR | SRB | Santa Rosa Airport | | |
| Santa Rosa del Sara | | Santa Cruz | SLSK | | Santa Rosa del Sara Airport | | |
| Santa Teresita | | Santa Cruz | SLSE | | Santa Teresita Airport | | |
| Santiago | Moxos | Beni | SLTG | | Santiago Airport | | |
| Santiago de Chiquitos | | Santa Cruz | SLSQ | | Saahaqui Airport | | |
| Sipuati | | Beni | SLSG | | San Miguel de Gaser Airport | | |
| Sasasama | | Santa Cruz | SLSS | | Saipura Airport | | |
| Sipuati | | Tarija | SLSP | | Sipuati Airport | | |
| Taquipirenda | Cordillera | Santa Cruz | SLTA | | Taquipirenda Airport | | |
| Teoponte | Larecaja | La Paz | SLTE | | Teoponte Airport | | |
| Tiboy | Yacuma | Beni | SLTB | | Tiboy Airport | | |
| Tiguipa | Luis Calvo | Tarija | SLTY | | Tiguipa Airport | | |
| Tupiza | Sud Chichas | Potosí | SLTZ | | Tupiza Airport | | |
| Ulla Ulla | Franz Tamayo | La Paz | SLUU | | Ulla Ulla Airport | | |
| Uncía | Bustillo | Potosí | SLUN | | Uncía Airport | | |
| Urusi | José Ballivián | Beni | SLUS | | Urusi Airport | | |
| Uyuni | Quijarro | Potosí | SLUY | UYU | **Uyuni Airport** | | |
| Villa Negrita | | Beni | SLVN | | Villa Negrita Airport | | |
| Villa Vista de Montaño | | Beni | SLBV | | Villa Vista Airport | | |
| Venecia | Yacuma | Beni | SLVE | | Venecia Airport | | |
| San Cristóbal | Nor Lípez | Potosí | SLTL | | Toldos Airport | | |
| Villa Aroma | Aroma | La Paz | SLVA | | Villa Aroma Airport | | |
| Villa Elvira | Mamoré | Beni | SLVV | | Villa Elvira Airport | | |
| Villazon | Modesto Omiste | Potosí | SLVZ | | Villazon Airport | | |
| Vuelta Grande | Luis Calvo | Chuquisaca | SLVU | | Vuelta Grande Airport | | |
| Yapacaní | | Santa Cruz | SLYI | | Yapacaní Airport | | |
**Airports with unverified coordinates**
| Boyuibe | Cordillera | Santa Cruz | SLBY | | Boyuibe Airport | | |
| Comarapa | M. Caballero | Santa Cruz | SLCR | | Comarapa Airport | | |
| La Cañada | José Ballivián | Beni | SLLN | | La Cañada Airport | | |
| Laguna Verde | Sud Lípez | Potosí | SLLG / SLDE | | Laguna Verde Airport | | |
| Laja | Los Andes | La Paz | SLLJ | | Laja Airport | | |
| Madidi | Iturralde | La Paz | SLMD | | Madidi Airport | | |
| Rosapata | Carangas | Oruro | SLRP | | Rosapata Airport | | |
| San Ignacito | Moxos | Beni | SLGN | | San Ignacito Airport | | |
| Sanandita | Gran Chaco | Tarija | SLSN | | Sanandita Airport | | |
| Santa Juanita | Moxos | Beni | SLJT | | Santa Juanita Airport | | |

== See also ==
- Bolivian Air Force (Fuerza Aérea Boliviana)
- Transportation in Bolivia
- List of airports by ICAO code: S#SL - Bolivia
- Wikipedia:WikiProject Aviation/Airline destination lists: South America#Bolivia
