= Bella Union (disambiguation) =

Bella Unión is a city in Uruguay.

Bella Union may also refer to:

== Places ==
- Bella Union, an airport in Bolivia

== Brands and enterprises ==
- Bella Union, an independent record label
- Bella Unión Airport, an airstrip northeast of Santa Ana del Yacuma, Bolivia
- Bella Unión District, a district of Peru
- Bella Union Hotel, Los Angeles, California
- Bella Union Saloon, Deadwood, South Dakota
- A former saloon in the Barbary Coast district of San Francisco
