= Upper Cumberland Regional Airport =

Rural airport in Tennessee, US

- IATA: none; ICAO: KSRB; FAA LID: SRB

Summary
- Airport type: Public
- Owner: Upper Cumberland Airport Authority
- Serves: Cookeville, Tennessee Sparta, Tennessee
- Elevation AMSL: 1,025 ft / 312 m
- Coordinates: 36°03′21″N 085°31′51″W

Map
- Location of airport in Tennessee SRB (the United States)

Runways
| Direction | Length | | Surface |
| Direction | ft | m | Surface |
|---|---|---|---|
| 4/22 | 6,704 | 2,043 | Asphalt |

Statistics (2020)
- Aircraft operations: 33,095
- Based aircraft: 109
- Source: Federal Aviation Administration

Upper Cumberland Regional Airport (ICAO: KSRB, FAA LID: SRB) is a public use airport located adjacent to Tennessee State Route 111 approximately 8.5 nautical miles (15.7 km) south of the central business district of Cookeville and 9 nautical miles (17 km) northwest of the central business district of Sparta. Owned by the Upper Cumberland Airport Authority, which comprises the Cities of Cookeville and Sparta and the governments of White County and Putnam County, it is included in the National Plan of Integrated Airport Systems for 2011–2015, which categorized it as a general aviation facility.

Although many U.S. airports use the same three-letter location identifier for the FAA and IATA, this airport is assigned SRB by the FAA but has no designation from the IATA (which assigned SRB to Santa Rosa Airport in Santa Rosa, Beni, Bolivia).

== Facilities and aircraft ==
Upper Cumberland Regional Airport covers an area of 362 acres (146 ha) at an elevation of 1,025 feet (312 m) above mean sea level. It has one runway designated 4/22 with an asphalt surface measuring 6,704 by 100 feet (2,043 x 30 m).

For the 12-month period ending December 31, 2020, the airport had 33,095 aircraft operations, an average of 91 per day: 63% general aviation, 33% air taxi, and 3% military. At that time there were 109 aircraft based at this airport: 86 single-engine, 15 multi-engine, 4 jet, and 4 helicopter.

== See also ==
- List of airports in Tennessee
