= Slsh =

Slsh or SLSH may refer to:

- S-Lang shell, slsh, for the S-Lang programming library
- Somaliland shilling, the currency of Somaliland
- Santa Ana de Huachi Airport, ICAO code
