= El Cairo Airport =

- IATA: none; ICAO: SLEC

Summary
- Airport type: Public
- Serves: El Cairo, Bolivia
- Elevation AMSL: 531 ft / 162 m
- Coordinates: 13°47′25″S 66°19′15″W

Map
- Location of El Cairo Airport in Bolivia

Runways
Direction	Length		Surface
Direction	m	ft	Surface
15/33	1,500	4,921	Grass
- Source: Landings.com Bing Maps GCM

El Cairo Airport (ICAO: SLEC) is an airstrip in the pampa of Beni Department in Bolivia. The nearest town is Santa Rosa de Yacuma, 60 kilometres (37 mi) southwest.

== See also ==
- Transport in Bolivia
- List of airports in Bolivia
