= SLCL =

SLCL may refer to:

- St. Louis County Library, Ladue, St. Louis County, Missouri, USA
- Challapata Airport (ICAO airport code SLCL), Challapata, Oruro, Bolivia
- Single Light Colour Light signal, a type of railway signaling used in Australian railway signalling
