= El Peru del Apere Airport =

- IATA: none; ICAO: SLEP

Summary
- Airport type: Public
- Serves: El Peru del Apere, Bolivia
- Elevation AMSL: 528 ft / 161 m
- Coordinates: 14°36′20″S 65°38′05″W

Map
- Location of El Peru del Apere Airport in Bolivia

Runways
| Direction | Length | | Surface |
| Direction | m | ft | Surface |
|---|---|---|---|
| 16/34 | 1,520 | 4,987 | Grass |
- Sources: Landings.com Google Maps GCM

El Peru del Apere Airport (ICAO: SLEP) is an airport serving the town of El Peru del Apere in the Beni Department of Bolivia. The runway is adjacent to the west side of the town, which is on a bend of the Apere River.

== See also ==
- Transport in Bolivia
- List of airports in Bolivia
