= SLCD (disambiguation) =

SLCD may stand for:

- Spring-loaded camming device, a rock climbing protection equipment
- Super LCD, a display technology used by numerous manufacturers for mobile device displays
- S-LCD Corporation, former name of Samsung Display, a South Korean manufacturer of display panels
- Cañada Airport, Bolivia, (ICAO code SLCD), an airport in the Santa Cruz Department of Bolivia
- San Lorenzo College of Davao, an educational institution in Davao City, Philippines
- Panasonic CD interface, also known as SLCD, an obsolete proprietary computer interface
