= Comarapa Airport =

Airport in Bolivia

- IATA: none; ICAO: SLCR

Summary
- Airport type: Public
- Serves: Comarapa
- Location: Bolivia
- Elevation AMSL: 6,186 ft / 1,885 m
- Coordinates: 17°54′48.7″S 64°31′4.5″W

Map
- Location of Comarapa Airport in Bolivia

Runways
Direction	Length		Surface
Direction	ft	m	Surface
14/32	520	158	Grass
- Source: Landings.com

Comarapa Airport (ICAO: SLCR) is a public use airport located near Comarapa, Santa Cruz, Bolivia.

== See also ==
- Transport in Bolivia
- List of airports in Bolivia
