= Abapo Airport =

- IATA: none; ICAO: SLAB

Summary
- Airport type: Defunct
- Serves: Abapo, Bolivia
- Elevation AMSL: 1,166 ft / 355 m
- Coordinates: 18°38′04″S 62°56′12″W

Map
- Location of Abapo Airport in Bolivia

Runways
Direction	Length		Surface
Direction	ft	m	Surface
Closed
- Source: Landings.com Google Maps GCM

Abapo Airport (ICAO: SLAB) was a public use airport in the Santa Cruz Department of Bolivia.

The runway seen in a 2016 aerial image at the coordinates given is overgrown with scrub and brush, with no access road apparent. The location is 58 kilometres (36 mi) distant from Abapó.

== See also ==
- Transport in Bolivia
- List of airports in Bolivia
