= El Dorado Airport (disambiguation) =

El Dorado International Airport is the main airport in Bogotá, Colombia

El Dorado Airport or Eldorado Airport may also refer to:

- El Dorado Airport (Argentina) in Eldorado, Misiones, Argentina
- El Dorado Airport (Bolivia) in El Dorado, La Paz Department, Bolivia
- Captain Jack Thomas/El Dorado Airport in El Dorado, Kansas, United States
- South Arkansas Regional Airport at Goodwin Field in El Dorado, Arkansas, United States
- Eldorado Airport (Texas) outside Eldorado, Texas, United States
- El Dorado Airport (Venezuela) in El Dorado, Venezuela
