= Rancho Alegre =

Rancho Alegre may refer to:

- Rancho Alegre, Texas, census-designated place in Jim Wells County, Texas
- Rancho Alegre, Paraná, Brazilian municipality
- Rancho Alegre d'Oeste, municipality in Paraná, Brazil
- Rancho Alegre, Bolivia
  - Rancho Alegre Airport, in Bolivia
- Rancho Alegre, a Boy Scouts camp in the Los Padres Council area
- Rancho Alegre (film) 1941 film with Miguel Aceves Mejía
- Rancho Alegre, a nonprofit organization dedicated to Conjunto music, based in Austin, Texas
