= Santa Rosa del Sara Airport =

- IATA: none; ICAO: SLSK

Summary
- Airport type: Public
- Serves: Santa Rosa del Sara, Bolivia
- Elevation AMSL: 850 ft (260 m)
- Coordinates: 17°06′16″S 63°36′30″W

Map
- Location of Santa Rosa del Sara Airport in Bolivia

Runways
Direction	Length		Surface
Direction	m	ft	Surface
02/20	690	2,264	Grass
- Sources: Landings.com Google Maps GCM

Santa Rosa del Sara Airport (ICAO: SLSK) is an airstrip serving the town of Santa Rosa del Sara (de) in the Santa Cruz Department of Bolivia. The runway is on the northwest corner of the town.

== See also ==
- Transport in Bolivia
- List of airports in Bolivia
