= El Remate Airport =

- IATA: none; ICAO: SLRE

Summary
- Airport type: Public
- Serves: Santa Rosa del Sara, Bolivia
- Elevation AMSL: 958 ft / 292 m
- Coordinates: 17°04′10″S 63°39′10″W

Map
- Location of El Remate Airport in Bolivia

Runways
| Direction | Length | | Surface |
| Direction | m | ft | Surface |
|---|---|---|---|
| 12/30 | 1,140 | 3,740 | Grass |
- Source: Landings.com Google Maps GCM

El Remate Airport (ICAO: SLRE) is an airstrip 7 kilometres (4.3 mi) northwest of Santa Rosa del Sara (de) in the Santa Cruz Department of Bolivia.

== See also ==
- Transport in Bolivia
- List of airports in Bolivia
