= Inglaterra Airport =

- IATA: none; ICAO: SLIG

Summary
- Airport type: Public
- Serves: Inglaterra, Bolivia
- Elevation AMSL: 527 ft / 161 m
- Coordinates: 13°26′40″S 66°30′15″W

Map
- Location of Inglaterra Airport in Bolivia

Runways
Direction	Length		Surface
Direction	m	ft	Surface
12/30	1,700	5,577	Grass
- Sources: Landings.com Google Maps GCM

Inglaterra Airport (ICAO: SLIG) is an airstrip in the lightly populated pampa of the Beni Department in Bolivia. It is 10 kilometres (6.2 mi) east of the village of Puerto Yata, and 74 kilometres (46 mi) northeast of Santa Rosa de Yacuma, the nearest town in the region. The runway is near a large meander of the Yata River.

== See also ==
- Transport in Bolivia
- List of airports in Bolivia
