= Santa Rita Airport =

- IATA: none; ICAO: SLRT

Summary
- Airport type: Public
- Serves: Santa Rita, Bolivia
- Elevation AMSL: 750 ft / 229 m
- Coordinates: 13°54′30″S 66°21′45″W

Map
- Location of Santa Rita Airport in Bolivia

Runways
Direction	Length		Surface
Direction	m	ft	Surface
16/34	620	2,034	Grass
- Sources: Landings.com Bing Maps GCM

Santa Rita Airport (ICAO: SLRT) is a rural airstrip serving the pampa region of the Beni Department of Bolivia. The nearest town is Santa Rosa de Yacuma, 50 kilometres (31 mi) southwest.

The San Borja VOR (Ident: BOR) is located 59.9 nautical miles (110.9 km) south-southwest of the airport.

== See also ==
- Transport in Bolivia
- List of airports in Bolivia
