= MQK =

MQK or mqk may refer to:

- MQK, the IATA code for San Matías Airport, Bolivia
- mqk, the ISO 639-3 code for Rajah Kabunsuwan language, Philippines
