= Cerdas =

Cerdas may refer to:

- Cerdas Airport, an airport in Bolivia
- Cerdas Barus (born 1961), Indonesian chess player
- Sara Cerdas (born 1989), Portuguese politician
