= Intiraymi =

Intiraymi or Inti Raymi may refer to:

- Inti Raymi, Incan festival
- Intiraymi Airport, Bolivian airport
- Naoto Inti Raymi (born 1979), Japanese singer-songwriter
