= Chacobo =

Chacobo or Chakobo may refer to:

- Chácobo people, an ethnic group of Bolivia
- Chakobo language, a language of Bolivia

== See also ==
- Chacobos Airport, in Bolivia
- Chacabuco, an abandoned town in Chile
- Chakobsa, a language
