= San Juan Airport =

San Juan Airport may refer to:

- Luis Muñoz Marín International Airport, serving San Juan, Puerto Rico
- Domingo Faustino Sarmiento Airport, serving San Juan, Argentina
- Ohkay Owingeh Airport, formerly known as the San Juan Pueblo Airport
- Fernando Ribas Dominicci Airport, a secondary commercial airport also serving San Juan, Puerto Rico (also known as Isla Grande Airport)
- San Juan Airport (Bolivia) in San Juan, Beni Department, Bolivia
