= Santiago Airport =

Santiago Airport normally refers to:

- Arturo Merino Benítez International Airport (SCL), also known as Santiago International Airport, in Santiago de Chile, Chile
- Santiago de Compostela Airport, in Santiago de Compostela, Spain
- Santiago Airport (Brazil), in Santiago, Rio Grande do Sul, Brazil

It may also refer to:

- Antonio Maceo Airport, in Santiago de Cuba, Cuba
- Cibao International Airport, in Santiago de los Caballeros, Dominican Republic
- Del Caribe International General Santiago Marino Airport, in Isla Margarita, Venezuela
- Praia International Airport, on Santiago Island in Cape Verde
- Querétaro International Airport, in Santiago de Querétaro, Mexico
- Ruben Cantu Airport, in Santiago de Veraguas, Panama
- Santiago Airport (Bolivia), in San Ignacio de Moxos, Beni Department, Bolivia
- Santiago del Estero Airport, in Santiago del Estero, Argentina
- Santiago Pérez Quiroz Airport, in Arauca, Colombia
