= Florida Airport =

Florida Airport may refer to:

- Florida Airport (Bolivia) in Florida, Velasco province, Santa Cruz department, Bolivia (ICAO: SLFL)
- Florida Airport (Cuba) in Florida, Camagüey province, Cuba (ICAO: MUFL)

== See also ==
- List of airports in Florida (United States)
