= Buen Retiro Ballivian Airport =

- IATA: none; ICAO: SLBT

Summary
- Airport type: Public
- Serves: Buen Retiro Ballivian, Bolivia
- Elevation AMSL: 529 ft / 161 m
- Coordinates: 13°54′45″S 66°33′45″W

Map
- Location of Buen Retiro Ballivian Airport in Bolivia

Runways
Direction	Length		Surface
Direction	m	ft	Surface
05/23	506	1,660	Grass
- Sources: Landings.com Google Maps GCM

Buen Retiro Ballivian Airport (ICAO: SLBT) is an airstrip 30 kilometres (19 mi) northeast of Santa Rosa de Yacuma in the lightly populated pampa of the Beni Department in Bolivia.

== See also ==
- Transport in Bolivia
- List of airports in Bolivia
