= La Esperanza Airport (Bolivia) =

- IATA: none; ICAO: SLEZ

Summary
- Airport type: Public
- Serves: La Esperanza, Bolivia
- Elevation AMSL: 501 ft / 153 m
- Coordinates: 14°25′00″S 65°31′05″W

Map
- Location of La Esperanza Airport in Bolivia

Runways
Direction	Length		Surface
Direction	m	ft	Surface
15/33	810	2,657	Grass
- Sources: Landings.com Google Maps GCM

La Esperanza Airport (ICAO: SLEZ) is an airstrip located along the Apere River in the Beni Department of Bolivia.

== See also ==
- Transport in Bolivia
- List of airports in Bolivia
