= Espiritu Airport =

Aerodrome in Beni, Bolivia

- IATA: none; ICAO: SLES

Summary
- Airport type: Public
- Serves: Espiritu, Bolivia
- Elevation AMSL: 754 ft / 230 m
- Coordinates: 13°48′20″S 66°12′15″W

Map
- Location of the airport in Bolivia

Runways
Direction	Length		Surface
Direction	m	ft	Surface
16/34	710	2,329	Grass
- Sources: GCM Google Maps

Espiritu Airport (ICAO: SLES) is an airstrip serving the ranching settlement of Espiritu in the Beni Department of Bolivia. The nearest town to Espiritu in the sparsely populated pampa is Santa Rosa, 70 kilometres (43 mi) west-southwest. There are numerous grass airstrips in the region.

== See also ==
- Transport in Bolivia
- List of airports in Bolivia
