= Progreso Airport =

- IATA: none; ICAO: SLPG

Summary
- Airport type: Public
- Serves: Progreso, Bolivia
- Elevation AMSL: 754 ft / 230 m
- Coordinates: 14°10′45″S 65°22′30″W

Map
- Location of Progreso Airport in Bolivia

Runways
Direction	Length		Surface
Direction	m	ft	Surface
16/34	1,786	5,860	Grass
- Sources: Landings.com Google Maps GCM

Progreso Airport (ICAO: SLPG) is an airport serving the Apere River village of Progreso in the Beni Department of Bolivia.

== See also ==
- Transport in Bolivia
- List of airports in Bolivia
