= La Vertiente Airport =

La Vertiente Airport may refer to:

- La Vertiente Airport (Bolivia) in La Vertiente, Tarija, Bolivia
- La Vertiente Airport (Chile) near Chillán, Bío Bío, Chile
