= El Desengaño Airport =

Aerodrome on the Apere River, Bolivia

- IATA: none; ICAO: SLDN

Summary
- Airport type: Public
- Serves: El Desengaño, Bolivia
- Elevation AMSL: 507 ft / 155 m
- Coordinates: 14°16′25″S 65°26′25″W

Map
- Location of El Desengaño Airport in Bolivia

Runways
Direction	Length		Surface
Direction	m	ft	Surface
17/35	1,100	3,609	Grass
- Source: Landings.com Bing Maps GCM

El Desengaño Airport (ICAO: SLDN) is an airport serving El Desengaño, a village on the Apere River in the Beni Department of Bolivia.

== See also ==
- Transport in Bolivia
- List of airports in Bolivia
