= Monte Verde Airport =

Airstrip in the Santa Cruz Department of Bolivia

- IATA: none; ICAO: SLMV

Summary
- Airport type: Public
- Serves: Monte Verde
- Elevation AMSL: 997 ft / 304 m
- Coordinates: 18°3′45″S 62°18′25″W

Map
- Location of Monte Verde Airport in Bolivia

Runways
Direction	Length		Surface
Direction	m	ft	Surface
17/35	1,000	3,281	Grass
- Sources: Landings.com HERE Maps GCM

Monte Verde Airport (ICAO: SLMV) is an airstrip serving the agricultural land around Monte Verde in the Santa Cruz Department of Bolivia.

== See also ==
- Transport in Bolivia
- List of airports in Bolivia
