= El Triunfo Airport =

- IATA: none; ICAO: SLEF

Summary
- Airport type: Public
- Serves: El Triunfo
- Elevation AMSL: 486 ft / 148 m
- Coordinates: 13°51′12″S 65°48′15″W

Map
- Location of El Triunfo Airport in Bolivia

Runways
Direction	Length		Surface
Direction	m	ft	Surface
15/33	580	1,903	Grass
- Sources: Landings.com Google Maps GCM

El Triunfo Airport (ICAO: SLEF) is an airstrip by the Yacuma River in the pampa of the Beni Department in Bolivia. The nearest town is Santa Ana del Yacuma, 42 kilometres (26 mi) to the east.

== See also ==
- Transport in Bolivia
- List of airports in Bolivia
