= San Pedro Salvatierra Airport =

- IATA: none; ICAO: SLZB

Summary
- Airport type: Public
- Serves: San Pedro Salvatierra
- Elevation AMSL: 544 ft / 166 m
- Coordinates: 14°50′15″S 65°42′11″W

Map
- Location of San Pedro Salvatierra Airport in Bolivia

Runways
Direction	Length		Surface
Direction	m	ft	Surface
16/34	520	1,706	Grass
- Sources: Landings.com Google Maps GCM

San Pedro Salvatierra Airport (ICAO: SLZB) is an airstrip serving San Pedro Salvatierra in the Beni Department of Bolivia. The runway is 18 kilometres (11 mi) north of San Ignacio de Moxos.

== See also ==
- Transport in Bolivia
- List of airports in Bolivia
