= Cavinas Airport =

Airport in Bolivia

- IATA: none; ICAO: SLCV

Summary
- Airport type: Public
- Serves: Puerto Cavinas, Bolivia
- Elevation AMSL: 656 ft / 200 m
- Coordinates: 12°33′00″S 66°54′45″W

Map
- Location of Cavinas Airport in Bolivia

Runways
Direction	Length		Surface
Direction	m	ft	Surface
17/35	1,070	3,510	Grass
- Sources: Landings.com Google Maps GCM

Cavinas Airport (ICAO: SLCV) is an airstrip serving the Beni River town of Puerto Cavinas (de) and the Cavinas Mission in the Beni Department of Bolivia. The runway is 1.6 kilometres (0.99 mi) south of Puerto Cavinas, and just northwest of the Catholic mission.

== See also ==
- Transport in Bolivia
- List of airports in Bolivia
