= Fatima Airport =

- IATA: none; ICAO: SLFA

Summary
- Airport type: Public
- Serves: Fatima, Bolivia
- Elevation AMSL: 1,000 ft / 305 m
- Coordinates: 15°27′10″S 66°44′44″W

Map
- Location of the airport in Bolivia

Runways
Direction	Length		Surface
Direction	m	ft	Surface
03/21	1,000	3,281	Grass
- Sources: GCM Google Maps

Fatima Airport (ICAO: SLFA) is an airport serving the mission village of Fatima in the Beni Department of Bolivia. The runway extends northeast from the mission, within a bend of the small Chimanes River, which shortly feeds into the Rapulo River. There are no roads into Fatima.

The Fatima Mission tends to the needs of the Tsimane, an isolated tribe of Bolivian Amerindians in the eastern Andes foothills.

== See also ==
- Transport in Bolivia
- List of airports in Bolivia
