= Tiguipa Airport =

- IATA: none; ICAO: SLTY

Summary
- Airport type: Public
- Serves: Tigüipa
- Elevation AMSL: 1,722 ft / 525 m
- Coordinates: 21°00′20″S 63°19′39″W

Map
- Location of Tiguipa Airport in Bolivia

Runways
Direction	Length		Surface
Direction	m	ft	Surface
03/21	1,164	3,819	Grass
- Source: Landings.com Google Maps GCM

Tiguipa Airport (ICAO: SLTY) is a public use airport serving the town of Tigüipa in the Tarija Department of Bolivia. Tigüipa is in the eastern foothills of the Bolivian Andes, 30 kilometres (19 mi) north of Villamontes.

== See also ==
- Transport in Bolivia
- List of airports in Bolivia
