= Nuevo Mundo Airport =

- IATA: none; ICAO: SLNO

Summary
- Airport type: Public
- Serves: Nuevo Mundo, Bolivia
- Elevation AMSL: 548 ft / 167 m
- Coordinates: 14°28′40″S 66°02′00″W

Map
- Location of Nuevo Mundo Airport in Bolivia

Runways
Direction	Length		Surface
Direction	m	ft	Surface
02/20	800	2,625	Grass
- Sources: Landings.com HERE Maps GCM

Nuevo Mundo Airport (ICAO: SLNO) is an airport in the lightly populated pampa of the Beni Department in Bolivia.

== See also ==
- Transport in Bolivia
- List of airports in Bolivia
