= Josuani Airport =

- IATA: none; ICAO: SLJS

Summary
- Airport type: Public
- Serves: Josuani, Bolivia
- Elevation AMSL: 498 ft / 152 m
- Coordinates: 13°6′20″S 66°10′28″W

Map
- Location of Josuani Airport in Bolivia

Runways
Direction	Length		Surface
Direction	m	ft	Surface
18/36	884	2,900	Grass
- Sources: Landings.com Google Maps GCM

Josuani Airport (ICAO: SLJS) is an airstrip in the pampa of the Beni Department in Bolivia. The runway is within the Reserva Nacional Lagunas de Beni y Pando, a Bolivian wildlife sanctuary.

== See also ==
- Transport in Bolivia
- List of airports in Bolivia
