= Caranda Airport =

- IATA: none; ICAO: SLDA

Summary
- Airport type: Public
- Serves: Caranda, Bolivia
- Elevation AMSL: 1,082 ft / 330 m
- Coordinates: 17°30′50″S 63°32′10″W

Map
- Location of Caranda Airport in Bolivia

Runways
Direction	Length		Surface
Direction	m	ft	Surface
17/35	820	2,690	Grass
- Sources: Landings.com Google Maps GCM

Caranda Airport (ICAO: SLDA) is an airstrip serving Caranda in the Santa Cruz Department of Bolivia. The runway is just north of the village.

== See also ==
- Transport in Bolivia
- List of airports in Bolivia
