= Buen Retiro Airport =

Buen Retiro Itenez Airport Buen Retiro Airport
- IATA: none; ICAO: SLBR

Summary
- Airport type: Public
- Serves: Buen Retiro Itenez, Bolivia
- Elevation AMSL: 474 ft / 144 m
- Coordinates: 13°26′40″S 63°30′10″W

Map
- Location of Buen Retiro Itenez Airport in Bolivia

Runways
Direction	Length		Surface
Direction	m	ft	Surface
16/34	770	2,526	Grass
- Sources: Landings.com GCM

Buen Retiro Itenez Airport (ICAO: SLBR) is an airstrip 30 kilometres (19 mi) northeast of Baures in the Beni Department of Bolivia.

Buen Retiro Itenez is on the San Joaquin River, a minor tributary of the San Martin River.

== See also ==
- Transport in Bolivia
- List of airports in Bolivia
