= Palmira Airport =

- IATA: none; ICAO: SLPM

Summary
- Airport type: Public
- Serves: Palmira, Bolivia
- Elevation AMSL: 530 ft / 162 m
- Coordinates: 13°44′15″S 66°24′35″W

Map
- Location of Palmira Airport in Bolivia

Runways
Direction	Length		Surface
Direction	m	ft	Surface
16/34	1,450	4,757	Grass
- Sources: Landings.com Google Maps GCM

Palmira Airport (ICAO: SLPM) is an airstrip serving the Palmira region of the Bolivian pampa in the Beni Department of Bolivia.

== See also ==
- Transport in Bolivia
- List of airports in Bolivia
