= Yapacaní Airport =

- IATA: none; ICAO: SLYI

Summary
- Airport type: Public
- Serves: Yapacaní
- Elevation AMSL: 816 ft / 249 m
- Coordinates: 17°00′35″S 64°03′35″W

Map
- Location of Yapacaní Airport in Bolivia

Runways
Direction	Length		Surface
Direction	ft	m	Surface
16/34		1,286	Grass
- Source: GCM Landings.com Google Maps

Yapacaní Airport (ICAO: SLYI) is an airport serving the town of Yapacaní in the Santa Cruz Department of Bolivia. The airport is by the village of Los Pozos, 47 kilometres (29 mi) north of Yapacaní.

== See also ==
- Transport in Bolivia
- List of airports in Bolivia
