= Cuevo Airport =

- IATA: none; ICAO: SLUC

Summary
- Airport type: Public
- Serves: Cuevo, Bolivia
- Elevation AMSL: 3,440 ft / 1,049 m
- Coordinates: 20°28′40″S 63°31′40″W

Map
- Location of Cuevo Airport in Bolivia

Runways
Direction	Length		Surface
Direction	ft	m	Surface
Closed
- Source: Landings.com

Cuevo Airport (ICAO: SLUC) was an airstrip 2 kilometres (1.2 mi) south of Cuevo in the Santa Cruz Department of Bolivia. Cuevo is a small town in a valley of the Cordillera Central mountains 25 kilometres (16 mi) west of Boyuibe.

Google Earth Historical Imagery (May 2006) shows 560 metres (1,840 ft) of an original 1,100 metres (3,600 ft) runway unobstructed by trees and brush. Later images by HERE/Nokia and Bing Maps show no length of clear runway.

== See also ==
- Transport in Bolivia
- List of airports in Bolivia
