= Sipuati Airport =

- IATA: none; ICAO: SLSP

Summary
- Airport type: Public
- Serves: Sipuati
- Elevation AMSL: 1,400 ft / 427 m
- Coordinates: 21°04′05″S 63°06′34″W

Map
- Location of Sipuati Airport in Bolivia

Runways
Direction	Length		Surface
Direction	m	ft	Surface
01/19	1,235	4,052	Grass
- Source: Landings.com Google Maps GCM

Sipuati Airport (ICAO: SLSP) is a public use airport near Sipuati in the Tarija Department of Bolivia.

== See also ==
- Transport in Bolivia
- List of airports in Bolivia
