= Saipura Airport =

Saipirú Airport Saipura Airport
- IATA: none; ICAO: SLSS

Summary
- Airport type: Public
- Serves: Saipirú station
- Elevation AMSL: 2,039 ft / 621 m
- Coordinates: 19°23′45″S 63°04′20″W

Map
- Location of Saipirú Airport in Bolivia

Runways
Direction	Length		Surface
Direction	m	ft	Surface
01/19	1,590	5,217	Grass
- Source: Landings.com Google Maps

Saipirú Airport (ICAO: SLSS) is a public use airstrip serving the natural gas pipeline facility at Saipirú in the Santa Cruz Department of Bolivia.

== See also ==
- Transport in Bolivia
- List of airports in Bolivia
