= Blanca Flor Airport =

- IATA: none; ICAO: SLBF

Summary
- Airport type: Public
- Serves: Blanca Flor, Bolivia
- Elevation AMSL: 598 ft / 182 m
- Coordinates: 11°43′35″S 66°55′35″W

Map
- Location of Blanca Flor Airport in Bolivia

Runways
Direction	Length		Surface
Direction	m	ft	Surface
13/31	1,680	5,512	Grass
- Sources: Landings.com Bing Maps GCM

Blanca Flor Airport (ICAO: SLBF) is an airstrip serving the village of Blanca Flor in the Pando Department of Bolivia. The runway parallels the short road from the Beni River to the village.

== See also ==
- Transport in Bolivia
- List of airports in Bolivia
