= La India Airport =

- IATA: none; ICAO: SLLI

Summary
- Airport type: Public
- Serves: La India
- Elevation AMSL: 540 ft / 165 m
- Coordinates: 13°34′00″S 66°50′15″W

Map
- Location of La India Airport in Bolivia

Runways
Direction	Length		Surface
Direction	m	ft	Surface
17/35	1,600	5,249	Grass
- Source: Landings.com Google Maps GCM

La India Airport (ICAO: SLLI) is an airstrip serving the Yata River village of La India in the Beni Department of Bolivia.

== See also ==
- Transport in Bolivia
- List of airports in Bolivia
