= Charaña Airport =

Airstrip in La Paz Department, Bolivia

- IATA: none; ICAO: SLCN

Summary
- Airport type: Public
- Serves: Charaña
- Elevation AMSL: 13,310 ft / 4,057 m
- Coordinates: 17°35′40″S 69°26′00″W

Map
- Location of Charaña Airport in Bolivia

Runways
Direction	Length		Surface
Direction	m	ft	Surface
10/28	2,040	6,693	Dirt
- Source: Landings.com GCM Google Maps

Charaña Airport Spanish: Aeropuerto Charaña, (ICAO: SLCN) is an extremely high elevation airstrip serving Charaña, a town in the altiplano of the La Paz Department of Bolivia. The airport is east of the town and 3 kilometres (1.9 mi) east of the border with Chile.

The Charana non-directional beacon (Ident: CHA) is located on the field.

== See also ==
- Transport in Bolivia
- List of airports in Bolivia
