= Samaipata Florida Airport =

Samaipata Airport Aeropuerto de Samaipata
- IATA: none; ICAO: SLIP

Summary
- Airport type: Public
- Serves: Samaipata
- Elevation AMSL: 5,600 ft / 1,707 m
- Coordinates: 18°11′35″S 63°52′40″W

Map
- Location of Samaipata Florida Airport in Bolivia

Runways
Direction	Length		Surface
Direction	m	ft	Surface
04/22	800	2,625	Grass
- Sources: Landings.com Google Maps GCM

Samaipata Airport (Spanish: Aeropuerto de Samaipata) (ICAO: SLIP) is a public use airport located 2 kilometres (1 mi) south of Samaipata in the Santa Cruz Department of Bolivia.

The airport is in the eastern foothills of the Bolivian Andes, and there is rising terrain in all quadrants.

== See also ==
- Transport in Bolivia
- List of airports in Bolivia
