= La Habana Airport =

- IATA: none; ICAO: SLHB

Summary
- Airport type: Public
- Serves: La Habana, Bolivia
- Elevation AMSL: 490 ft / 149 m
- Coordinates: 14°15′45″S 64°52′20″W

Map
- Location of the airport in Bolivia

Runways
Direction	Length		Surface
Direction	m	ft	Surface
17/35	2,155	7,070	Grass
- Sources: GCM Google Maps

La Habana Airport (ICAO: SLHB) is an airport 8 kilometres (5 mi) northeast of San Pedro, a village in the Beni Department of Bolivia.

== See also ==
- Transport in Bolivia
- List of airports in Bolivia
