= El Porvenir Sur Airport =

Airport in Bolivia

- IATA: none; ICAO: SLPW

Summary
- Airport type: Public
- Serves: El Porvenir Sur, Bolivia
- Elevation AMSL: 2,238 ft / 682 m
- Coordinates: 20°45′10″S 63°12′34″W

Map
- Location of El Porvenir Sur Airport in Bolivia

Runways
| Direction | Length | | Surface |
| Direction | m | ft | Surface |
|---|---|---|---|
| 18/36 | 1,525 | 5,003 | Grass |
- Source: Landings.com GCM

El Porvenir Sur Airport (ICAO: SLPW) is an airport serving the El Porvenir Sur gas pipeline facility in the Chuquisaca Department of Bolivia.

The El Porvenir non-directional beacon (Ident: PVR) is located on the field.

== See also ==
- Transport in Bolivia
- List of airports in Bolivia
