= Choreti Airport =

- IATA: none; ICAO: SLCT

Summary
- Airport type: Public
- Serves: Choreti, Bolivia
- Elevation AMSL: 456 ft / 139 m
- Coordinates: 13°30′35″S 64°58′00″W

Map
- Location of Choreti Airport in Bolivia

Runways
Direction	Length		Surface
Direction	m	ft	Surface
17/35	1,658	5,440	Grass
- Sources: Landings.com Google Maps GCM

Choreti Airport (Spanish: Aeropuerto Choreti, (ICAO: SLCT)) is an airstrip 55 kilometres (34 mi) northeast of Santa Ana del Yacuma in the pampa of the Beni Department in Bolivia.

== See also ==
- Transport in Bolivia
- List of airports in Bolivia
