= Covendo Airport =

Airport in Bolivia

- IATA: none; ICAO: SLVD

Summary
- Airport type: Public
- Serves: Covendo, Bolivia
- Elevation AMSL: 1,763 ft / 537 m
- Coordinates: 15°47′15″S 66°58′18″W

Map
- Location of the airport in Bolivia

Runways
Direction	Length		Surface
Direction	m	ft	Surface
07/25	950	3,117	Grass
- Sources: GCM Google Maps

Covendo Airport (ICAO: SLVD) is an airport serving the riverside village of Covendo in the La Paz Department of Bolivia.

The airport runs alongside a bend of the upper Beni River (Alto Beni). There is mountainous terrain nearby, northeast through west.

== See also ==
- Transport in Bolivia
- List of airports in Bolivia
