= San Pedro del Rio Blanco Airport =

San Pedro del Río Blanco Airport San Pedro Richard Airport
- IATA: none; ICAO: SLZJ

Summary
- Airport type: Public
- Serves: Laguna Portia
- Elevation AMSL: 700 ft (210 m)
- Coordinates: 14°11′15″S 63°32′53″W

Map
- Location of San Pedro del Río Blanco Airport in Bolivia

Helipads
Number	Length		Surface
Number	m	ft	Surface
15/33	700	2,297	Grass
- Source: Landings.com Google Maps

San Pedro del Río Blanco Airport (ICAO: SLZJ) is a rural airstrip on the western end of Laguna Portia, a lake in the Beni Department of Bolivia.

== See also ==
- Transport in Bolivia
- List of airports in Bolivia
