= Lago Huachi Airport =

- IATA: none; ICAO: SLLH

Summary
- Airport type: Public
- Serves: Lago Huachi, Bolivia
- Elevation AMSL: 565 ft / 172 m
- Coordinates: 14°17′45″S 63°24′35″W

Map
- Location of the airport in Bolivia

Runways
Direction	Length		Surface
Direction	m	ft	Surface
17/35	1,400	4,593	Grass
- Sources: GCM Google Maps

Lago Huachi Airport (ICAO: SLLH) is an airport serving the lakeside village of Lago Huachi in the Beni Department of Bolivia. The runway extends north from the village.

== See also ==
- Transport in Bolivia
- List of airports in Bolivia
