= Rincon del Tigre Airport =

- IATA: none; ICAO: SLRX

Summary
- Airport type: Public
- Serves: Rincon del Tigre, Bolivia
- Elevation AMSL: 664 ft / 202 m
- Coordinates: 18°12′5″S 58°10′10″W

Map
- Location of Rincon del Tigre Airport in Bolivia

Runways
Direction	Length		Surface
Direction	m	ft	Surface
01/19	1,260	4,134	Grass
- Sources: Landings.com Google Maps GCM

Rincon del Tigre Airport (ICAO: SLRX) is an airport serving the village of Rincon del Tigre in the Santa Cruz Department of Bolivia.

== See also ==
- Transport in Bolivia
- List of airports in Bolivia
