= El Cocal Airport =

- IATA: none; ICAO: SLEA

Summary
- Airport type: Public
- Serves: El Cocal, Bolivia
- Elevation AMSL: 508 ft / 155 m
- Coordinates: 13°34′10″S 66°04′20″W

Map
- Location of El Cocal Airport in Bolivia

Runways
Direction	Length		Surface
Direction	m	ft	Surface
15/33	700	2,297	Grass
- Sources: Landings.com Google Maps GCM

El Cocal Airport (ICAO: SLEA) is an airstrip in the pampa of the Beni Department in Bolivia. The runway is 70 kilometres (43 mi) west of Santa Ana del Yacuma.

== See also ==
- Transport in Bolivia
- List of airports in Bolivia
