= Villa Elvira Airport =

- IATA: none; ICAO: SLVV

Summary
- Airport type: Public
- Serves: Villa Elvira
- Elevation AMSL: 722 ft / 220 m
- Coordinates: 13°38′40″S 64°26′25″W

Map
- Location of Villa Elvira Airport in Bolivia

Runways
Direction	Length		Surface
Direction	m	ft	Surface
18/36	750	2,461	Grass
- Source: Landings.com Google Maps

Villa Elvira Airport (ICAO: SLVV) is a single runway public use airport serving the Mamoré Province in the Beni Department of Bolivia.

== See also ==
- Transport in Bolivia
- List of airports in Bolivia
