= San Javier Airport (Bolivia) =

- IATA: SJV; ICAO: SLJV

Summary
- Airport type: Public
- Serves: San Javier, Bolivia
- Elevation AMSL: 1,702 ft / 519 m
- Coordinates: 16°16′00″S 62°28′14″W

Map
- Location of San Javier Airport in Bolivia

Runways
Direction	Length		Surface
Direction	m	ft	Surface
01/19	1,600	5,249	Grass
- Source: Landings.com Google Maps GCM

San Javier Airport (IATA: SJV, ICAO: SLJV) is an airport serving San Javier in the Santa Cruz Department of Bolivia. The runway is 3 kilometres (1.9 mi) east of the town.

The San Javier non-directional beacon (Ident: SJV) is located 8.6 nautical miles (15.9 km) west-southwest of the airport.

== See also ==
- Transport in Bolivia
- List of airports in Bolivia
