= Tres Cruces Airport =

- IATA: none; ICAO: SLTC

Summary
- Airport type: Public
- Serves: Chiquitos Province, Bolivia
- Elevation AMSL: 880 ft / 268 m
- Coordinates: 17°27′00″S 61°59′35″W

Map
- Location of Tres Cruces Airport in Bolivia

Runways
Direction	Length		Surface
Direction	m	ft	Surface
15/33	1,200	3,937	Grass
- Source: Landings.com HERE Maps

Tres Cruces Airport (ICAO: SLTC) is one of numerous rural airstrips in the agricultural area east of Santa Cruz de la Sierra, a city in the Santa Cruz Department of Bolivia.

The Viru Viru VOR-DME (Ident: VIR) is located 52.4 nautical miles (97 km) west-southwest of the runway.

== See also ==
- Transport in Bolivia
- List of airports in Bolivia
