= Huacareta Airport =

- IATA: none; ICAO: SLHC

Summary
- Airport type: Public
- Serves: Huacareta, Bolivia
- Elevation AMSL: 4,668 ft / 1,423 m
- Coordinates: 20°23′30″S 64°00′57″W

Map
- Location of Huacareta Airport in Bolivia

Runways
Direction	Length		Surface
Direction	m	ft	Surface
01/19	1,080	3,543	Grass
- Source: Landings.com Google Maps GCM

Huacareta Airport (Spanish: Aeropuerto Huacareta), (ICAO: SLHC) is an airstrip 3 kilometres (1.9 mi) south of the village of Huacareta in the Chuquisaca Department of Bolivia.

Huacareta is within a fold of the Cordillera Central mountain range, and there is high terrain east and west of the runway.

== See also ==
- Transport in Bolivia
- List of airports in Bolivia
