= Tupiza Airport =

Tupiza Airport Aeropuerto Tupiza
- IATA: none; ICAO: SLTZ

Summary
- Airport type: Public
- Serves: Tupiza
- Elevation AMSL: 11,300 ft / 3,444 m
- Coordinates: 21°20′10″S 065°36′42″W

Map
- Location of Tupiza Airport in Bolivia

Runways
Direction	Length		Surface
Direction	m	ft	Surface
03/21	2,490	8,169	Grass
15/33	1,771	5,810	Dirt
- Source: Landings.com Google Maps GCM

Tupiza Airport (Spanish: Aeropuerto Tupiza, (ICAO: SLTZ)) is a very high elevation airport 16 kilometres (10 mi) northeast of Tupiza, a city in the Potosí Department of Bolivia.

== See also ==
- Transport in Bolivia
- List of airports in Bolivia
