= La Vertiente Airport (Bolivia) =

- IATA: none; ICAO: SLVT

Summary
- Airport type: Public
- Serves: La Vertiente, Bolivia
- Elevation AMSL: 1,300 ft / 396 m
- Coordinates: 21°17′00″S 63°17′42″W

Map
- Location of La Vertiente Airport in Bolivia

Runways
Direction	Length		Surface
Direction	m	ft	Surface
01/19	1,990	6,529	Grass
- Sources: Landings.com Google Maps GCM

La Vertiente Airport (ICAO: SLVT) is an airport serving the pipeline facility at La Vertiente in the Tarija Department of Bolivia.

The Villamontes non-directional beacon (Ident: VTS) is located 12 kilometres (7.5 mi) west of the airport, near Villamontes on the Lieutenant Colonel Rafael Pabón Airport.

== See also ==
- Transport in Bolivia
- List of airports in Bolivia
