= El Paraíso Airport =

- IATA: none; ICAO: SLEO

Summary
- Airport type: Public
- Serves: El Paraíso, Bolivia
- Elevation AMSL: 540 ft / 165 m
- Coordinates: 14°24′15″S 65°52′47″W

Map
- Location of El Paraíso Airport in Bolivia

Runways
Direction	Length		Surface
Direction	m	ft	Surface
17/35	713	2,339	Grass
- Sources: Landings.com Google Maps GCM

El Paraíso Airport (ICAO: SLEO) is an airstrip serving El Paraíso in the pampa of the Beni Department in Bolivia.

== See also ==
- Transport in Bolivia
- List of airports in Bolivia
