= Caranavi Airport =

- IATA: none; ICAO: SLVI

Summary
- Airport type: Public
- Serves: Caranavi, Bolivia
- Elevation AMSL: 2,100 ft / 640 m
- Coordinates: 15°50′05″S 67°34′00″W

Map
- Location of the airport in Bolivia

Runways
Direction	Length		Surface
Direction	m	ft	Surface
12/30	710	2,329	Dirt
- Sources: GCM Google Maps

Caranavi Airport (ICAO: SLVI) is an airport serving the town of Caranavi in the La Paz Department of Bolivia. The runway also serves as Civica Street, a main street in the center of the town.

Caranavi is in the moderately narrow valley of the Coroico River, with high terrain in all quadrants.

== See also ==
- Transport in Bolivia
- List of airports in Bolivia
