= Caigua Airport =

Airport in the Tarija Department of Bolivia

- IATA: none; ICAO: SLCI

Summary
- Airport type: Public
- Serves: El Cielo, Bolivia
- Elevation AMSL: 1,440 ft / 439 m
- Coordinates: 21°08′10″S 63°45′10″W

Map
- Location of Caigua Airport in Bolivia

Runways
Direction	Length		Surface
Direction	m	ft	Surface
01/19	1,560	5,118	Concrete
- Sources: Landings.com HERE Maps GCM

Caigua Airport (Spanish: Aeropuerto Caigua) (ICAO: SLCI) is an airport serving the gas pipeline construction in the Cordillera Central, 32 kilometres (20 mi) west of Villamontes in the Tarija Department of Bolivia.

The airport is alongside the Huacaya River, a minor tributary of the Pilcomayo River.

== See also ==
- Transport in Bolivia
- List of airports in Bolivia
