= Manuripi Airport =

- IATA: none; ICAO: SLMN

Summary
- Airport type: Public
- Serves: Manuripi, Bolivia
- Elevation AMSL: 705 ft / 215 m
- Coordinates: 11°46′30″S 68°25′22″W

Map
- Location of Manuripi Airport in Bolivia

Runways
Direction	Length		Surface
Direction	m	ft	Surface
01/19	820	2,690	Grass
- Sources: Landings.com Google Maps GCM

Manuripi Airport (ICAO: SLMN) is an airstrip serving the settlement of Manuripi on the Manuripi River in the Pando Department of Bolivia.

== See also ==
- Transport in Bolivia
- List of airports in Bolivia
