= Tiboy Airport =

- IATA: none; ICAO: SLTB

Summary
- Airport type: Public
- Serves: Tiboy
- Elevation AMSL: 666 ft / 203 m
- Coordinates: 13°48′40″S 66°15′15″W

Map
- Location of Tiboy Airport in Bolivia

Runways
| Direction | Length | | Surface |
| Direction | m | ft | Surface |
|---|---|---|---|
| 16/34 | 622 | 2,041 | Grass |
- Source: Landings.com Google Maps GCM

Tiboy Airport (ICAO: SLTB) is a public use airport near Tiboy, Beni, Bolivia.

== See also ==
- Transport in Bolivia
- List of airports in Bolivia
