= Culpina Airport =

Airport in Bolivia

- IATA: none; ICAO: SLCU

Summary
- Airport type: Public
- Serves: Culpina, Bolivia
- Elevation AMSL: 9,676 ft / 2,949 m
- Coordinates: 20°52′00″S 64°57′30″W

Map
- Location of Culpina Airport in Bolivia

Runways
Direction	Length		Surface
Direction	m	ft	Surface
09/27	1,890	6,201	Grass
- Sources: Landings.com Google Maps GCM

Culpina Airport (ICAO: SLCU) is a high elevation airport serving the town of Culpina (de) in the Chuquisaca Department of Bolivia. The runway is 4.5 kilometres (2.8 mi) south of the town in the Culpina basin of the Cordillera Central mountains.

== See also ==
- Transport in Bolivia
- List of airports in Bolivia
