= Venecia Airport =

- IATA: none; ICAO: SLVE

Summary
- Airport type: Public
- Serves: Venecia, Bolivia
- Elevation AMSL: 722 ft / 220 m
- Coordinates: 14°38′10″S 66°45′00″W

Map
- Location of Venecia Airport in Bolivia

Runways
Direction	Length		Surface
Direction	m	ft	Surface
15/33	500	1,640	Grass
- Sources: Landings.com Google Maps GCM

Venecia Airport (ICAO: SLVE) is a public use airport located near Venecia in the Beni Department of Bolivia. The nearest village in the sparsely populated region is Santa Elena del Caripo, 10 kilometres (6.2 mi) northwest. San Borja, 24 kilometres (15 mi) south, is the nearest town.

The San Borja VOR (Ident: BOR) is located 13 nautical miles (24 km) south of the airport.

== See also ==
- Transport in Bolivia
- List of airports in Bolivia
