= Angora Airport =

- IATA: none; ICAO: SLAN

Summary
- Airport type: Public
- Serves: Angora, Bolivia
- Elevation AMSL: 512 ft (156 m)
- Coordinates: 14°25′42″S 65°47′30″W

Map
- Location of Angora Airport in Bolivia

Runways
Direction	Length		Surface
Direction	m	ft	Surface
13/31	685	2,247	Grass
- Source: Landings.com Google Maps GCM

Angora Airport (ICAO: SLAN) is an airstrip 64 kilometres (40 mi) north-northwest of San Ignacio de Moxos in the Beni Department of Bolivia.

== See also ==
- Transport in Bolivia
- List of airports in Bolivia
