= Espino Airport =

- IATA: none; ICAO: SLEI

Summary
- Airport type: Defunct
- Serves: San Isidro del Espino
- Elevation AMSL: 2,313 ft / 705 m
- Coordinates: 19°17′52″S 63°12′33″W

Map
- Location of Espino Airport in Bolivia
- Source: Landings.com Google Maps

Espino Airport (ICAO: SLEI) was an airstrip 10 kilometres (6.2 mi) southeast of San Isidro del Espino (de:San Isidro del Espino), a village in the Santa Cruz Department of Bolivia.

Google Maps, HERE Maps, and Bing Maps all show the remains of a grass airstrip overgrown with brush and trees.

== See also ==
- Transport in Bolivia
- List of airports in Bolivia
