= Puerto America Airport =

- IATA: none; ICAO: SLPU

Summary
- Airport type: Public
- Serves: Puerto America, Bolivia
- Elevation AMSL: 505 ft / 154 m
- Coordinates: 11°45′45″S 67°57′35″W

Map
- Location of the airport in Bolivia

Runways
Direction	Length		Surface
Direction	m	ft	Surface
01/19	1,600	5,249	Grass
- Sources: GCM Google Maps

Puerto America Airport (ICAO: SLPU) is an airport serving the Madre de Dios River village of Puerto America in the Pando Department of Bolivia. The runway extends north from the village.

== See also ==
- Transport in Bolivia
- List of airports in Bolivia
