= Cachascani Airport =

Airstrip in Bolivia

- IATA: none; ICAO: SLHA

Summary
- Airport type: Public
- Serves: Cachascani, Bolivia
- Elevation AMSL: 466 ft / 142 m
- Coordinates: 13°31′35″S 64°14′05″W

Map
- Location of Cachascani Airport in Bolivia

Runways
| Direction | Length | | Surface |
| Direction | m | ft | Surface |
|---|---|---|---|
| 15/33 | 615 | 2,018 | Grass |
- Source: Landings.com Google Maps GCM

Cachascani Airport (ICAO: SLHA) is an airstrip in the pampa of Beni Department in Bolivia. The nearest town is Magdalena, 35 kilometres (22 mi) to the northeast.

== See also ==
- Transport in Bolivia
- List of airports in Bolivia
