= Puerto Rico Airport =

Puerto Rico Airport Aeropuerto de Puerto Rico
- IATA: PUR; ICAO: SLPR

Summary
- Airport type: Public
- Serves: Puerto Rico, Bolivia
- Elevation AMSL: 597 ft / 182 m
- Coordinates: 11°06′25″S 67°32′50″W

Map
- Location of Puerto Rico Airport in Bolivia

Runways
Direction	Length		Surface
Direction	m	ft	Surface
10/28	1,340	4,396	Grass
- Source: Landings.com Google Maps GCM

Puerto Rico Airport (Spanish: Aeropuerto de Puerto Rico, (IATA: PUR, ICAO: SLPR)) is a public airport serving Puerto Rico, in the Pando Department of Bolivia. The western end of the runway doubles as a street in the town.

== See also ==
- Transport in Bolivia
- List of airports in Bolivia
