= Porvenir Velasco Airport =

Porvenir Norte Airport Aeropuerto de Porvenir Norte
- IATA: none; ICAO: SLPN

Summary
- Airport type: Public
- Serves: Porvenir
- Elevation AMSL: 595 ft / 181 m
- Coordinates: 13°59′20″S 61°32′32″W

Map
- Location of Porvenir Norte Airport in Bolivia

Runways
Direction	Length		Surface
Direction	m	ft	Surface
01/19	713	2,339	Grass
- Source: Landings.com Google Maps GCM

Porvenir Norte Airport (Spanish: Aeropuerto de Porvenir Norte, (ICAO: SLPN)) is an airport serving the village of Porvenir in the Santa Cruz Department of Bolivia.

== See also ==
- Transport in Bolivia
- List of airports in Bolivia
