= Jatata Airport =

- IATA: none; ICAO: SLJA

Summary
- Airport type: Public
- Serves: Jatata, Bolivia
- Elevation AMSL: 575 ft / 175 m
- Coordinates: 11°46′17″S 67°15′30″W

Map
- Location of Jatata Airport in Bolivia

Runways
Direction	Length		Surface
Direction	m	ft	Surface
14/32	600	1,969	Grass
- Source: Landings.com Google Maps GCM

Jatata Airport (ICAO: SLJA) is an airstrip serving Jatata, a riverside hamlet in the Pando Department of Bolivia. A short stretch of road just east of Jatata is used as the runway.

== See also ==
- Transport in Bolivia
- List of airports in Bolivia
