= Saahaqui Airport =

Santiago de Chiquitos Airport Saahaqui Airport
- IATA: none; ICAO: SLSQ

Summary
- Airport type: Public
- Serves: Santiago de Chiquitos
- Elevation AMSL: 1,990 ft / 607 m
- Coordinates: 18°20′40″S 59°36′20″W

Map
- Location of Saahaqui Airport in Bolivia

Runways
Direction	Length		Surface
Direction	m	ft	Surface
16/34	997	3,271	Grass
- Source: Landings.com Google Maps GCM

Santiago de Chiquitos Airport (ICAO: SLSQ) is a public use airport serving the town of Santiago de Chiquitos in the Santa Cruz Department of Bolivia.

== See also ==
- Transport in Bolivia
- List of airports in Bolivia
