= Retiro Airport =

- IATA: none; ICAO: SLRR

Summary
- Airport type: Public
- Serves: Retiro, Bolivia
- Elevation AMSL: 556 ft / 169 m
- Coordinates: 14°29′10″S 66°18′30″W

Map
- Location of Retiro Airport in Bolivia

Runways
Direction	Length		Surface
Direction	m	ft	Surface
14/32	550	1,804	Grass
- Sources: Landings.com Google Maps GCM

Retiro Airport (ICAO: SLRR) is an airstrip serving Retiro in the Beni Department of Bolivia.

== See also ==
- Transport in Bolivia
- List of airports in Bolivia
