= Urusi Airport =

- IATA: none; ICAO: SLUS

Summary
- Airport type: Public
- Serves: Urusi
- Elevation AMSL: 805 ft / 245 m
- Coordinates: 14°19′25″S 66°07′40″W

Map
- Location of Urusi Airport in Bolivia

Runways
Direction	Length		Surface
Direction	m	ft	Surface
01/19	550	1,804	Grass
- Source: Landings.com Google Maps GCM

Urusi Airport (ICAO: SLUS) is a public use airport serving Urusi in the Beni Department of Bolivia. The runway is on the east bank of the Rapulo River.

== See also ==
- Transport in Bolivia
- List of airports in Bolivia
