= San Miguel de Gaser Airport =

- IATA: none; ICAO: SLSG

Summary
- Airport type: Public
- Serves: Sipuati
- Elevation AMSL: 700 ft / 213 m
- Coordinates: 13°54′35″S 66°7′40″W

Map
- Location of San Miguel de Gaser Airport in Bolivia

Runways
| Direction | Length | | Surface |
| Direction | m | ft | Surface |
|---|---|---|---|
| 16/34 | 580 | 1,903 | Grass |
- Source: Landings.com HERE Maps GCM

San Miguel de Gaser Airport (ICAO: SLSG) is a public use airport located near Sipuati, Beni, Bolivia.

== See also ==
- Transport in Bolivia
- List of airports in Bolivia
