= Villa Aroma Airport =

- IATA: none; ICAO: SLVA

Summary
- Airport type: Public
- Serves: Sica Sica
- Elevation AMSL: 12,533 ft / 3,820 m
- Coordinates: 17°19′15″S 67°45′10″W

Map
- Location of Villa Aroma Airport in Bolivia

Runways
Direction	Length		Surface
Direction	m	ft	Surface
11/29	1,800	5,906	Grass
- Sources: Landings.com Google Maps GCM

Villa Aroma Airport (ICAO: SLVA) is a high-elevation airport serving the town of Sica Sica in the La Paz Department of Bolivia. The town and airport are on the eastern side of the Bolivian Altiplano.

== See also ==
- Transport in Bolivia
- List of airports in Bolivia
