= San Ignacio de Moxos Airport =

San Ignacio de Moxos Airport Aeropuerto de San Ignacio de Moxos
- IATA: SNM; ICAO: SLSM

Summary
- Airport type: Public
- Serves: San Ignacio de Moxos
- Elevation AMSL: 525 ft / 160 m
- Coordinates: 14°58′00″S 65°38′00″W

Map
- Location of San Ignacio de Moxos Airport in Bolivia

Runways
Direction	Length		Surface
Direction	m	ft	Surface
15/33	2,000	6,562	Grass
- Sources: GCM Google Maps

San Ignacio de Moxos Airport (Spanish: Aeropuerto de San Ignacio de Moxos) (IATA: SNM, ICAO: SLSM) is a public use airport serving the town of San Ignacio de Moxos in the Beni Department of Bolivia. The runway is 3 kilometres (1.9 mi) north of the town.

== See also ==
- Transport in Bolivia
- List of airports in Bolivia
