= Itaguazurenda Airport =

- IATA: none; ICAO: SLIT

Summary
- Airport type: Public
- Serves: Itaguazurenda, Bolivia
- Elevation AMSL: 1,598 ft / 487 m
- Coordinates: 19°47′00″S 63°05′10″W

Map
- Location of Itaguazurenda Airport in Bolivia

Runways
Direction	Length		Surface
Direction	m	ft	Surface
17/35	1,600	5,249	Grass
- Source: Landings.com Google Maps GCM

Itaguazurenda Airport (Spanish: Aeropuerto Itaguazurenda), (ICAO: SLIT) is an airport serving the agricultural area 12 kilometres (7.5 mi) east of Charagua in the Santa Cruz Department of Bolivia.

== See also ==
- Transport in Bolivia
- List of airports in Bolivia
