= Flor de Oro Airport =

- IATA: none; ICAO: SLFO

Summary
- Airport type: Public
- Serves: Flor de Oro, Bolivia
- Elevation AMSL: 560 ft / 171 m
- Coordinates: 13°33′17″S 61°00′15″W

Map
- Location of Flor de Oro Airport in Bolivia

Runways
Direction	Length		Surface
Direction	m	ft	Surface
13/31	1,160	3,806	Gravel
- Sources: Landings.com Google Maps GCM

Flor de Oro Airport (ICAO: SLFO) is an airport adjacent to the Flor de Oro Lodge in Bolivia's Noel Kempff Mercado National Park.

The national park is in the Santa Cruz Department, and is noted for its varied wildlife habitats, scenery, and waterfalls. The lodge is on the south bank of the Iténez River, locally the border between Bolivia and Brazil.

Accessible through charter flights, the airport is the entrance to the northern reaches of the park. It is the closest runway to Arcoiris Falls.

== See also ==
- Transport in Bolivia
- List of airports in Bolivia
