= El Escondido Airport =

Former airstrip in Tarija Department, Bolivia

- IATA: none; ICAO: SLEE

Summary
- Airport type: Defunct
- Serves: El Escondido
- Elevation AMSL: 1,246 ft / 380 m
- Coordinates: 21°27′52″S 63°21′09″W

Map
- Location of El Escondido Airport in Bolivia

Runways
Direction	Length		Surface
Direction	ft	m	Surface
Closed
- Source: Landings.com

El Escondido Airport (ICAO: SLEE) was an airstrip 25 kilometres (16 mi) southeast of Villamontes, in the Tarija Department of Bolivia.

Google Earth Historical Imagery (May 2005) shows runway closed markings (X), placed along the length of the runway. Subsequent images from Bing and HERE/Nokia, show progressive growth of brush and trees on the runway.

== See also ==
- Transport in Bolivia
- List of airports in Bolivia
