= Refugio Airport =

- IATA: none; ICAO: SLRF

Summary
- Airport type: Public
- Serves: Refugio
- Elevation AMSL: 610 ft / 186 m
- Coordinates: 14°45′50″S 61°01′55″W

Map
- Location of Refugio Airport in Bolivia

Runways
Direction	Length		Surface
Direction	m	ft	Surface
03/21	817	2,680	Grass
- Source: Landings.com HERE Maps GCM

Refugio Airport (ICAO: SLRF) is an airstrip serving Refugio, a river hamlet in the Santa Cruz Department of Bolivia.

== See also ==
- Transport in Bolivia
- List of airports in Bolivia
