= Camiare Airport =

Airport in Bolivia

- IATA: none; ICAO: SLCM

Summary
- Airport type: Public
- Serves: Camiare, Bolivia
- Elevation AMSL: 550 ft / 168 m
- Coordinates: 14°04′50″S 65°39′30″W

Map
- Location of Camiare Airport in Bolivia

Runways
Direction	Length		Surface
Direction	m	ft	Surface
16/34	2,055	6,742	Grass
- Sources: Landings.com Google Maps GCM

Camiare Airport (ICAO: SLCM) is an airstrip in the pampa of the Beni Department in Bolivia. The nearest town is Santa Ana del Yacuma, 43 kilometres (27 mi) to the northeast.

== See also ==
- Transport in Bolivia
- List of airports in Bolivia
