= San Vicente Airport (Bolivia) =

- IATA: none; ICAO: SLZV

Summary
- Airport type: Public
- Serves: San Vicente
- Location: Bolivia
- Elevation AMSL: 1,000 ft / 305 m
- Coordinates: 16°16′40″S 60°5′30″W

Map
- Location of San Vicente Airport in Bolivia

Runways
Direction	Length		Surface
Direction	m	ft	Surface
02/20	840	2,756	Grass
- Source: Landings.com Google Maps GCM

San Vicente Airport (ICAO: SLZV) is an airstrip 1 kilometre (0.62 mi) west of San Vicente, in the Santa Cruz Department of Bolivia. The town is on the border with Brazil.

== See also ==
- Transport in Bolivia
- List of airports in Bolivia
