= Monteagudo Airport =

Airport in Bolivia

- IATA: MHW; ICAO: SLAG

Summary
- Airport type: Public
- Serves: Monteagudo, Bolivia
- Elevation AMSL: 3,674 ft / 1,120 m
- Coordinates: 19°49′25″S 63°57′45″W

Map
- Location of Monteagudo Airport in Bolivia

Runways
Direction	Length		Surface
Direction	m	ft	Surface
16/34	2,000	6,562	Asphalt
- Source: Landings Google Maps GCM

Monteagudo Airport (Spanish: Aeropuerto Monteagudo, IATA: MHW, ICAO: SLAG) is an airport serving Monteagudo, a town in the Chuquisaca Department of Bolivia.

The airport is in a fold valley of the Cordillera Central range, with mountainous terrain nearby to the east and west. The Monteagudo non-directional beacon (Ident: AGU) is located on the field.

== See also ==
- Transport in Bolivia
- List of airports in Bolivia
