= Arampampa Airport =

Arampampa Airport Gral. Ballivián Airport
- IATA: none; ICAO: SLAM

Summary
- Airport type: Public
- Serves: Arampampa, Bolivia
- Elevation AMSL: 10,250 ft / 3,124 m
- Coordinates: 17°52′50″S 66°06′05″W

Map
- Location of the airport in Bolivia

Runways
| Direction | Length | | Surface |
| Direction | m | ft | Surface |
|---|---|---|---|
| 12/30 | 1,200 | 3,937 | Dirt |
- Sources: GCM Google Maps

Arampampa Airport (ICAO: SLAM) is a high-elevation airport serving the village of Arampampa in the Potosí Department of Bolivia. The runway is 2 kilometres (1.2 mi) west of the village. Both airport and village are on an irregular mesa in mountainous terrain.

== See also ==
- Transport in Bolivia
- List of airports in Bolivia
