= Buena Hora Airport =

- IATA: none; ICAO: SLBH

Summary
- Airport type: Public
- Serves: Buena Hora, Bolivia
- Elevation AMSL: 656 ft / 200 m
- Coordinates: 13°04′20″S 66°33′35″W

Map
- Location of Buena Hora Airport in Bolivia

Runways
Direction	Length		Surface
Direction	m	ft	Surface
16/34	1,231	4,039	Grass
- Sources: Landings.com Google Maps GCM

Buena Hora Airport (ICAO: SLBH) is an airstrip in the lightly populated pampa of the Beni Department of Bolivia. The nearest town is Santa Ana del Yacuma, 140 kilometres (87 mi) east-southeast.

== See also ==
- Transport in Bolivia
- List of airports in Bolivia
