= Cañada Larga Airport =

- IATA: none; ICAO: SLNL

Summary
- Airport type: Public
- Serves: Cañada Larga, Bolivia
- Elevation AMSL: 1,197 ft / 365 m
- Coordinates: 17°38′45″S 62°28′50″W

Map
- Location of the airport in Bolivia

Runways
Direction	Length		Surface
Direction	m	ft	Surface
17/35	740	2,428	Grass
- Sources: GCM Google Maps

Cañada Larga Airport (ICAO: SLNL) is an airstrip serving the farming village of Cañada Larga in the Santa Cruz Department of Bolivia.

The airstrip is just east of the village and is 70 kilometres (43 mi) east of Santa Cruz de la Sierra, the largest city of Bolivia. Cañada Larga is typical of the many small airstrips that dot the farming region east of the Bolivian Andes.

== See also ==
- Transport in Bolivia
- List of airports in Bolivia
