= El Condor Airport =

- IATA: none; ICAO: SLEK

Summary
- Airport type: Public
- Serves: El Condor, Bolivia
- Elevation AMSL: 1,734 ft / 529 m
- Coordinates: 21°41′57″S 63°27′26″W

Map
- Location of El Condor Airport in Bolivia

Runways
Direction	Length		Surface
Direction	ft	m	Surface
Closed
- Sources: Landings.com

El Condor Airport (ICAO: SLEK) was an airstrip 40 kilometres (25 mi) northeast of Yacuíba in the Tarija Department of Bolivia.

Google Earth Historical Imagery (May 2005) shows a 2,300 metres (7,500 ft) north-south strip of new growth running through old-growth forest. Current published imagery from Bing, Google, and HERE/Nokia show plowed crop fields crossing the faint remains of the runway.

== See also ==
- Transport in Bolivia
- List of airports in Bolivia
