= San Lorenzo Airport =

Bolivian airport

- IATA: none; ICAO: SLLZ

Summary
- Airport type: Public
- Serves: San Lorenzo de Moxos, Bolivia
- Elevation AMSL: 570 ft / 174 m
- Coordinates: 15°33′00″S 65°32′54″W

Map
- Location of San Lorenzo Airport in Bolivia

Runways
Direction	Length		Surface
Direction	m	ft	Surface
15/33	1,430	4,692	Grass
- Source: Google Maps Bing Maps

San Lorenzo Airport (ICAO: SLLZ) is an airstrip serving San Lorenzo de Moxos, a village in the Beni Department of Bolivia. The runway is at the north end of the village.

== See also ==
- Transport in Bolivia
- List of airports in Bolivia
