= Yabog Airport =

- IATA: none; ICAO: SLYG

Summary
- Airport type: Public
- Serves: Las Juntas
- Location: Bolivia
- Elevation AMSL: 1,412 ft / 430 m
- Coordinates: 18°39′17″S 63°08′00″W

Map
- Location of Yabog Airport in Bolivia

Runways
Direction	Length		Surface
Direction	m	ft	Surface
10/28	300	984	Grass
- Source: Landings.com Google Maps

Yabog Airport (ICAO: SLYG) is an airstrip near Las Juntas in the Santa Cruz Department of Bolivia.

Google Historical Imagery (June 2007) shows a 451 metres (1,480 ft) grass runway. Current imagery (September 2016) shows the runway reduced to 300 metres (980 ft) by trees and brush, with the eastern end of the runway eroding down into the Guapay River valley.

== See also ==
- Transport in Bolivia
- List of airports in Bolivia
