= Laguna Colorada Airport =

High elevation airstrip

- IATA: none; ICAO: SLLC

Summary
- Airport type: Public
- Serves: Laguna Colorada, Bolivia
- Elevation AMSL: 14,098 ft / 4,297 m
- Coordinates: 22°16′20″S 67°46′10″W

Map

Runways
Direction	Length		Surface
Direction	m	ft	Surface
08/26	2,390	7,841	Dirt

Laguna Colorada Airport (ICAO: SLLC) is an extremely high elevation airstrip just south of Laguna Colorada, a shallow salt lake within the Eduardo Avaroa Andean Fauna National Reserve in the southwest of the Bolivian altiplano.

There is moderately high terrain north, northwest, and southeast of the runway. Another consideration is that the shallow lake has a large resident population of flamingoes.

== See also ==
- Transport in Bolivia
- List of airports in Bolivia
