= Vuelta Grande Airport =

Vuelta Grande Airport Aeropuerto Vuelta Grande
- IATA: none; ICAO: SLVU

Summary
- Airport type: Public
- Serves: Vuelta Grande
- Elevation AMSL: 1,900 ft / 579 m
- Coordinates: 20°54′05″S 63°11′35″W

Map
- Location of Vuelta Grande Airport in Bolivia

Runways
Direction	Length		Surface
Direction	m	ft	Surface
17/35	1,000	3,281	Grass
- Source: Landings.com

Vuelta Grande Airport (Spanish: Aeropuerto Vuelta Grande, ICAO: SLVU) is a public use airport serving the Vuelta Grande gas recycling project in the Chuquisaca Department of Bolivia.

== See also ==
- Transport in Bolivia
- List of airports in Bolivia
