= Aiquile Airport =

- IATA: none; ICAO: SLAQ

Summary
- Airport type: Public
- Serves: Aiquile, Bolivia
- Elevation AMSL: 7,208 ft (2,197 m)
- Coordinates: 18°12′55″S 65°11′15″W

Map
- Location of Aiquile Airport in Bolivia

Runways
| Direction | Length | | Surface |
| Direction | m | ft | Surface |
|---|---|---|---|
| 06/24 | 1,265 | 4,150 | Grass |
- Source: Landings.com Google Maps GCM

Aiquile Airport (ICAO: SLAQ) is a public use airport serving Aiquile in the Cochabamba Department of Bolivia. The runway is in the southern section of the town.

== See also ==
- Transport in Bolivia
- List of airports in Bolivia
