= El Rancho Airport =

- IATA: none; ICAO: SLEH

Summary
- Airport type: Public
- Serves: Mamoré Province, Bolivia
- Elevation AMSL: 454 ft / 138 m
- Coordinates: 13°08′15″S 65°07′59″W

Map
- Location of El Rancho Airport in Bolivia

Runways
Direction	Length		Surface
Direction	m	ft	Surface
15/33	500	1,640	Grass
- Sources: Landings.com GCM

El Rancho Airport (ICAO: SLEH) is an airstrip in the pampa of the Beni Department in Bolivia. The runway is near a bend of the Mamoré River.

== See also ==
- Transport in Bolivia
- List of airports in Bolivia
