= El Salvador Airport =

- IATA: none; ICAO: SLEV

Summary
- Airport type: Public
- Serves: El Salvador, Bolivia
- Elevation AMSL: 574 ft / 175 m
- Coordinates: 14°29′52″S 66°45′45″W

Map
- Location of El Salvador Airport in Bolivia

Runways
Direction	Length		Surface
Direction	m	ft	Surface
04/22	475	1,558	Grass
- Sources: Landings.com Google Maps GCM

El Salvador Airport (ICAO: SLEV) is an airstrip in the pampa of the Beni Department in Bolivia. The nearest town is San Borja, 40 kilometres (25 mi) to the south.

== See also ==
- Transport in Bolivia
- List of airports in Bolivia
