= Laguna Loa Airport =

- IATA: none; ICAO: SLLL

Summary
- Airport type: Public
- Serves: Laguna Loa
- Elevation AMSL: 553 ft / 169 m
- Coordinates: 14°17′00″S 66°47′33″W

Map
- Location of Laguna Loa Airport in Bolivia

Runways
Direction	Length		Surface
Direction	m	ft	Surface
14/32	841	2,759	Grass
- Sources: Landings.com Google Maps GCM

Laguna Loa Airport (ICAO: SLLL) is an airstrip near Laguna Loa in the pampa region of Beni Department in Bolivia.

== See also ==
- Transport in Bolivia
- List of airports in Bolivia
