= Charagua Airport =

- IATA: none; ICAO: SLCG

Summary
- Airport type: Public
- Serves: Charagua, Bolivia
- Elevation AMSL: 2,040 ft / 622 m
- Coordinates: 19°47′05″S 63°11′20″W

Map
- Location of Charagua Airport in Bolivia

Runways
Direction	Length		Surface
Direction	m	ft	Surface
03/21	1,200	3,937	Grass
- Sources: Landings.com Google Maps GCM

Charagua Airport (Spanish: Aeropuerto Charagua, (ICAO: SLCG)) is an airport serving Charagua in the Santa Cruz Department of Bolivia. The runway is adjacent to the east side of the town.

== See also ==
- Transport in Bolivia
- List of airports in Bolivia
