= Padilla Airport =

- IATA: none; ICAO: SLPL

Summary
- Airport type: Public
- Serves: Padilla, Bolivia
- Elevation AMSL: 6,770 ft / 2,063 m
- Coordinates: 19°18′00″S 64°17′37″W

Map
- Location of Padilla Airport in Bolivia

Runways
Direction	Length		Surface
Direction	m	ft	Surface
14/32	1,300	4,265	Grass
- Sources: Landings.com Google Maps GCM

Padilla Airport (ICAO: SLPL) is an airport just north of the town of Padilla in the Chuquisaca Department of Bolivia.

There is moderately high terrain off the ends of both runways.

== See also ==
- Transport in Bolivia
- List of airports in Bolivia
