= Piso Firme Airport =

- IATA: none; ICAO: SLPF

Summary
- Airport type: Public
- Serves: Piso Firme
- Elevation AMSL: 575 ft / 175 m
- Coordinates: 13°37′35″S 61°44′22″W

Map
- Location of Piso Firme Airport in Bolivia

Runways
Direction	Length		Surface
Direction	m	ft	Surface
17/35	1,256	4,121	Grass
- Sources: Landings.com Google Maps GCM

Piso Firme Airport (ICAO: SLPF) is a public use airport within the Paragua River village of Piso Firme in the Santa Cruz Department of Bolivia. The runway parallels the river.

== See also ==
- Transport in Bolivia
- List of airports in Bolivia
