= Concepción Airport =

Airport serving Concepción, Bolivia

- IATA: CEP; ICAO: SLCP

Summary
- Airport type: Public
- Serves: Concepción, Bolivia
- Elevation AMSL: 1,631 ft / 497 m
- Coordinates: 16°08′35″S 62°01′35″W

Map
- Location of Concepción Airport in Bolivia

Runways
Direction	Length		Surface
Direction	m	ft	Surface
17/35	1,795	5,889	Grass
- Source: Landings.com Google Maps GCM

Concepción Airport (Spanish: Aeropuerto de Concepción) (IATA: CEP, ICAO: SLCP) is an airport serving Concepción, a town in the Santa Cruz Department of Bolivia. The runway is in the southern section of the town, which is in Bolivia's Gran Chaco region.

== See also ==
- Transport in Bolivia
- List of airports in Bolivia
