= San José de Chiquitos Airport =

- IATA: SJS; ICAO: SLJE

Summary
- Airport type: Public
- Serves: San José de Chiquitos, Bolivia
- Elevation AMSL: 942 ft / 287 m
- Coordinates: 17°49′55″S 60°44′35″W

Map
- Location of San José de Chiquitos Airport in Bolivia

Runways
Direction	Length		Surface
Direction	m	ft	Surface
18/36	1,150	3,773	Grass
- Source: Landings.com Google Maps GCM

San José de Chiquitos Airport Spanish: Aeropuerto San José de Chiquitos, (IATA: SJS, ICAO: SLJE) is an airport serving the town of San José de Chiquitos in the Santa Cruz Department of Bolivia. The runway is on the north edge of the town.

== See also ==
- Transport in Bolivia
- List of airports in Bolivia
