= Ventilla Airport =

- IATA: none; ICAO: SLTL

Summary
- Airport type: Public
- Serves: San Cristóbal silver mine
- Elevation AMSL: 11,800 ft / 3,597 m
- Coordinates: 21°10′30″S 67°10′00″W

Map
- Location of Ventilla Airport in Bolivia

Runways
Direction	Length		Surface
Direction	m	ft	Surface
13/31	3,120	10,236	Dirt
- Sources: Landings.com Google Maps GCM

Ventilla Airport (ICAO: SLTL) is a high-elevation airport serving the San Cristóbal silver mine and its supporting town in the Potosí Department of Bolivia. San Cristóbal is within the Bolivian Altiplano, and there is high terrain north and south of the runway.

== See also ==
- Transport in Bolivia
- List of airports in Bolivia
