= Las Brizas Airport =

- IATA: none; ICAO: SLLB

Summary
- Airport type: Public
- Serves: Las Brizas
- Elevation AMSL: 517 ft / 158 m
- Coordinates: 14°33′30″S 65°43′52″W

Map
- Location of Las Brizas Airport in Bolivia

Runways
Direction	Length		Surface
Direction	m	ft	Surface
15/33	658	2,159	Grass
- Sources: Landings.com Google Maps GCM

Las Brizas Airport (ICAO: SLLB) is an airstrip serving the village of Las Brizas on the headwaters of the Matos River in the Beni Department of Bolivia.

== See also ==
- Transport in Bolivia
- List of airports in Bolivia
