= Ulla Ulla Airport =

Ulla Ulla Airport Franz Tamayo Airport
- IATA: none; ICAO: SLUU

Summary
- Airport type: Public
- Serves: Ulla Ulla
- Elevation AMSL: 14,360 ft / 4,377 m
- Coordinates: 15°02′10″S 69°15′20″W

Map
- Location of Franz Tamayo Airport in Bolivia

Runways
Direction	Length		Surface
Direction	m	ft	Surface
08/26	1,300	4,265	Dirt
- Source: Landings.com Google Maps GCM

Ulla Ulla Airport (ICAO: SLUU) is an extremely-high elevation airport 3 kilometres (1.9 mi) north of Ulla Ulla village in the La Paz Department of Bolivia. Ulla Ulla is close to the Peruvian border north of Lake Titicaca.

While the entire region is mountainous, the airport is on an alluvial fan of the Cordillera Apolobamba mountains, with no hazardous terrain nearby. It also shares use as a road.

== See also ==
- Transport in Bolivia
- List of airports in Bolivia
