= Santa Teresita Airport (Bolivia) =

- IATA: none; ICAO: SLSE

Summary
- Airport type: Public
- Serves: Santa Teresita, Bolivia
- Elevation AMSL: 756 ft / 230 m
- Coordinates: 16°17′20″S 59°29′40″W

Map
- Location of Santa Teresita Airport in Bolivia

Runways
Direction	Length		Surface
Direction	m	ft	Surface
17/35	1,025	3,363	Grass
- Sources: Landings.com Google Maps GCM

Santa Teresita Airport (ICAO: SLSE) is a public use airport serving Santa Teresita in the Santa Cruz Department of Bolivia. Santa Teresita is a border crossing point with Brazil.

== See also ==
- Transport in Bolivia
- List of airports in Bolivia
