= Florencia Airport =

- IATA: none; ICAO: SLFR

Summary
- Airport type: Public
- Serves: Florencia, Bolivia
- Elevation AMSL: 574 ft / 175 m
- Coordinates: 15°41′12″S 65°31′50″W

Map
- Location of Florencia Airport in Bolivia

Runways
Direction	Length		Surface
Direction	m	ft	Surface
16/34	740	2,428	Grass
- Sources: Landings.com Google Maps GCM

Florencia Airport (ICAO: SLFR) is an airstrip 14 kilometres (8.7 mi) south-southeast of San Lorenzo in the pampa of Beni Department in Bolivia.

There are no paved roads into the airstrip.

== See also ==
- Transport in Bolivia
- List of airports in Bolivia
