= San Carlos Gutierrez Airport =

San Carlos Gutierrez Airport Aeropuerto San Carlos Gutierrez
- IATA: none; ICAO: SLSD

Summary
- Airport type: Public
- Serves: El Peru del Apere, Bolivia
- Elevation AMSL: 505 ft / 154 m
- Coordinates: 14°33′41″S 065°31′40″W

Map
- Location of airport in Bolivia

Runways
Direction	Length		Surface
Direction	m	ft	Surface
16/34	490	1,608	Grass
- Sources: Landings.com Google Maps GCM

San Carlos Gutierrez Airport Spanish: Aeropuerto San Carlos Gutierrez (ICAO: SLSD) is a rural airstrip 12 kilometres (7.5 mi) northeast of El Peru del Apere in the Beni Department of Bolivia.

== See also ==
- Transport in Bolivia
- List of airports in Bolivia
- Talk:San Carlos Gutierrez Airport
