= Cabezas Airport =

Airport in Bolivia

- IATA: none; ICAO: SLCE

Summary
- Airport type: Public
- Serves: Cabezas, Bolivia
- Elevation AMSL: 1,328 ft / 405 m
- Coordinates: 18°47′50″S 63°18′06″W

Map
- Location of Cabezas Airport in Bolivia

Runways
Direction	Length		Surface
Direction	m	ft	Surface
18/36	610	2,001	Grass
- Sources: Landings.com Google Maps GCM

Cabezas Airport (ICAO: SLCE) is an airstrip serving the small town of Cabezas in the Santa Cruz Department of Bolivia.

Cabezas is just east of the Cordillera Central mountains, and the runway is south of the town, next to the Grande River.

== See also ==
- Transport in Bolivia
- List of airports in Bolivia
