= Coquinal Airport =

Airport in Bolivia

- IATA: none; ICAO: SLQN

Summary
- Airport type: Public
- Serves: Coquinal, Bolivia
- Elevation AMSL: 535 ft / 163 m
- Coordinates: 13°12′05″S 66°59′15″W

Map
- Location of Coquinal Airport in Bolivia

Runways
Direction	Length		Surface
Direction	m	ft	Surface
13/31	425	1,394	Grass
- Source: Landings.com Google Maps GCM

Coquinal Airport (ICAO: SLQN) is an airstrip in the pampa of Beni Department in Bolivia. The runway is off a minor road bordering the wetlands around the Beni River.

== See also ==
- Transport in Bolivia
- List of airports in Bolivia
