= Pitai Airport =

- IATA: none; ICAO: SLPI

Summary
- Airport type: Public
- Serves: Pitai, Bolivia
- Elevation AMSL: 605 ft / 184 m
- Coordinates: 15°48′30″S 65°37′10″W

Map
- Location of Pitai Airport in Bolivia

Runways
Direction	Length		Surface
Direction	m	ft	Surface
15/33	670	2,198	Grass
- Source: Landings.com Google Maps GCM

Pitai Airport (ICAO: SLPI) is an airstrip in the sparsely populated Bolivian pampa of the Beni Department of Bolivia.

== See also ==
- Transport in Bolivia
- List of airports in Bolivia
