= Mizque Airport =

- IATA: none; ICAO: SLMZ

Summary
- Airport type: Public
- Serves: Mizque
- Elevation AMSL: 7,030 ft / 2,143 m
- Coordinates: 17°55′50″S 65°22′40″W

Map
- Location of Mizque Airport in Bolivia

Runways
Direction	Length		Surface
Direction	m	ft	Surface
10/28	900	2,953	Grass
- Sources: Landings.com Google Maps GCM

Mizque Airport (ICAO: SLMZ) is an airport 4 kilometres (2.5 mi) west-northwest of Mizque in the Cochabamba Department of Bolivia.

The runway is on a shallow alluvial fan, with the mountainous terrain of Bolivia's Cordillera Real in all quadrants.

== See also ==
- Transport in Bolivia
- List of airports in Bolivia
