= Izozog Airport =

- IATA: none; ICAO: SLIZ

Summary
- Airport type: Public
- Serves: Izozog, Bolivia
- Elevation AMSL: 1,082 ft / 330 m
- Coordinates: 18°40′15″S 63°00′07″W

Map
- Location of Izozog Airport in Bolivia

Runways
Direction	Length		Surface
Direction	m	ft	Surface
01/19	1,400	4,593	Grass
- Sourced: Landings.com Google Maps GCM

Izozog Airport (ICAO: SLIZ) is an airstrip 35 kilometres (22 mi) northeast of Cabezas in the Santa Cruz Department of Bolivia.

Google Earth Historical Imagery (August 2016) shows the runway overgrown with brush and trees.

== See also ==
- Transport in Bolivia
- List of airports in Bolivia
