= Villa Negrita Airport =

- IATA: none; ICAO: SLVN

Summary
- Airport type: Public
- Serves: Villa Negrita
- Elevation AMSL: 872 ft / 266 m
- Coordinates: 13°16′55″S 65°48′10″W

Map
- Location of Villa Negrita Airport in Bolivia

Runways
Direction	Length		Surface
Direction	m	ft	Surface
01/19	1,250	4,101	Grass
- Source: GCM Google Maps Landings.com

Villa Negrita Airport (ICAO: SLVN) is a public use airstrip near Villa Negrita in the Beni Department of Bolivia. Villa Negrita is a ranching region of Yacuma Province, south of Lake Guachuna in the Bolivian pampa.

== See also ==
- Transport in Bolivia
- List of airports in Bolivia
