= Gulf Airport =

- IATA: none; ICAO: SLGF

Summary
- Airport type: Private
- Serves: Basilio, Bolivia
- Elevation AMSL: 1,601 ft / 488 m
- Coordinates: 18°2′20″S 63°11′55″W

Map
- Location of Gulf Airport in Bolivia

Runways
Direction	Length		Surface
Direction	m	ft	Surface
16/34	710	2,329	Grass
- Sources: Landings.com Google Maps GCM

Gulf Airport (ICAO: SLGF) is an airstrip near the farming community of Basilio, 18 kilometres (11 mi) south of Santa Cruz de la Sierra in the Santa Cruz Department of Bolivia.

== See also ==
- Transport in Bolivia
- List of airports in Bolivia
