= Guirapembi Airport =

- IATA: none; ICAO: SLGP

Summary
- Airport type: Closed
- Serves: San Miguel del Monte Grande
- Elevation AMSL: 1,493 ft / 455 m
- Coordinates: 18°5′20″S 63°12′30″W

Map
- Location of Guirapembi Airport in Bolivia

Runways
Direction	Length		Surface
Direction	ft	m	Surface
Closed
- Source: Landings.com Google Maps

Guirapembi Airport (ICAO: SLGP) was an airstrip near the hamlet of San Miguel del Monte Grande, 25 kilometres (16 mi) south of Santa Cruz de la Sierra, Santa Cruz Department, Bolivia.

Google Earth Historical Imagery beginning with (5/2003) show the field continually shortened with fencing and livestock outbuildings. (8/2016) shows hay bales and cattle pasturing in the field.

== See also ==
- Transport in Bolivia
- List of airports in Bolivia
