= Santa Rosa Airport (Bolivia) =

Airport in Bolivia

- IATA: SRB; ICAO: SLSR

Summary
- Airport type: Public
- Serves: Santa Rosa
- Location: Bolivia
- Elevation AMSL: 538 ft / 164 m
- Coordinates: 14°4′20″S 66°47′15″W

Map
- Location of Santa Rosa Airport in Bolivia

Runways
Direction	Length		Surface
Direction	m	ft	Surface
01/19	1,830	6,004	Grass
- Source: Landings.com Google Maps GCM

Santa Rosa Airport (IATA: SRB, ICAO: SLSR) is a public use airport serving the town of Santa Rosa in the Beni Department of Bolivia. The runway is adjacent to the east side of the town.

== See also ==
- Transport in Bolivia
- List of airports in Bolivia
