= Nieve Airport =

- IATA: none; ICAO: SLNV

Summary
- Airport type: Public
- Serves: Nieve
- Elevation AMSL: 503 ft / 153 m
- Coordinates: 14°00′45″S 65°47′25″W

Map
- Location of Nieve Airport in Bolivia

Runways
Direction	Length		Surface
Direction	m	ft	Surface
17/35	700	2,297	Grass
- Sources: Landings.com Google Maps GCM

Nieve Airport (ICAO: SLNV) is an airport serving Nieve in the pampa of Beni Department in Bolivia.

== See also ==
- Transport in Bolivia
- List of airports in Bolivia
