= Santa Catalina Airport =

- IATA: none; ICAO: SLIN

Summary
- Airport type: Public
- Serves: Santa Catalina
- Elevation AMSL: 722 ft / 220 m
- Coordinates: 13°6′00″S 67°15′48″W

Map
- Location of Santa Catalina Airport in Bolivia

Runways
Direction	Length		Surface
Direction	m	ft	Surface
14/32	1,750	5,741	Grass
- Sources: Landings.com Google Maps

Santa Catalina Airport (ICAO: SLIN) is an airport serving Santa Catalina in the La Paz Department of Bolivia. The airport is 9 kilometres (5.6 mi) west of the Beni River.

== See also ==
- Transport in Bolivia
- List of airports in Bolivia
