= Capitán Germán Quiroga Guardia Airport =

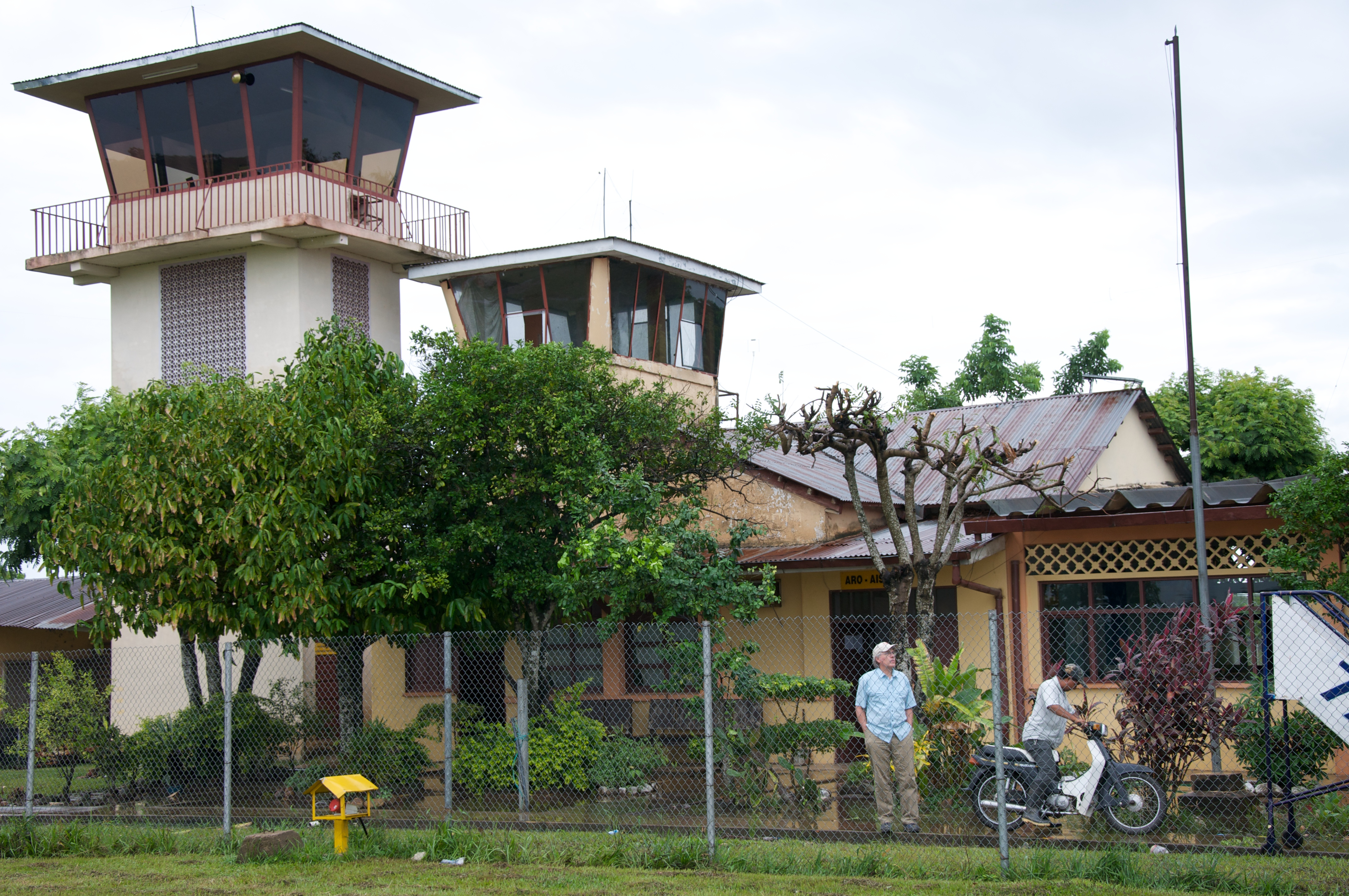
- IATA: SRJ; ICAO: SLSB

Summary
- Airport type: Public
- Location: San Borja, Bolivia
- Elevation AMSL: 633 ft / 193 m
- Coordinates: 14°51′25″S 66°44′15″W

Map
- Location of airport in Bolivia

Runways
Direction	Length		Surface
Direction	m	ft	Surface
18/36	1,800	5,906	Grass
- Sources: GCM Google Maps

Capitán Germán Quiroga Guardia Airport (IATA: SRJ, ICAO: SLSB) is an airport serving San Borja, a town in the Beni Department of Bolivia. The runway is in the eastern side of the town.

The San Borja VOR (Ident: BOR) and non-directional beacon (Ident: SRJ) are located on the field.

== Accidents and incidents ==
- On 18 January 1976, a Douglas C-47 of Frigorifico Maniqui, registration CP-573, crashed near Capitán Germán Quiroga Guardia Airport. The aircraft was on a domestic non-scheduled passenger flight from the airport and had returned to make an emergency landing following a failure of the starboard engine. Seven of the ten people on board were killed.

== See also ==
- Transport in Bolivia
- List of airports in Bolivia
