= Villa Vista Airport =

Villa Vista Airport Bella Vista Airport
- IATA: none; ICAO: SLBV

Summary
- Airport type: Public
- Elevation AMSL: 519 ft / 158 m
- Coordinates: 13°52′00″S 66°19′55″W

Map
- Location of the airport in Bolivia

Runways
Direction	Length		Surface
Direction	m	ft	Surface
16/34	1,305	4,281	Grass
- Sources: GCM Bing Maps

Villa Vista Airport (ICAO: SLBV) is an airport serving the lightly populated cattle ranching area of Montaño in the Beni Department of Bolivia. The nearest town is Santa Rosa, 54 kilometres (34 mi) southwest.

The San Borja VOR (Ident: BOR) is located 63.9 nautical miles (118.3 km) south-southwest of the airport.

There are numerous other grass airstrips in the pampa region, most with runway lengths less than 700 metres (2,300 ft).

== See also ==
- Transport in Bolivia
- List of airports in Bolivia
