= Uncía Airport =

Uncia Airport
- IATA: none; ICAO: SLUN

Summary
- Airport type: Public
- Serves: Llallagua, Bolivia
- Location: Uncia
- Elevation AMSL: 12,395 ft / 3,778 m
- Coordinates: 18°28′25″S 66°32′45″W

Map
- Location of the airport in Bolivia

Runways
Direction	Length		Surface
Direction	m	ft	Surface
11/29	2,020	6,627	Dirt
14/32	1,400	4,593	Dirt
- Sources: GCM Google Maps

Uncia Airport (ICAO: SLUN) is a high-elevation airport serving the cities of Llallagua and Uncia in the Potosí Department of Bolivia.

The airport is just east of Uncia. There is mountainous terrain in all quadrants.

== See also ==
- Transport in Bolivia
- List of airports in Bolivia
