= San Francisco Naciff Airport =

Airport in Bolivia

San Francisco Naciff Airport Aeropuerto San Francisco Naciff
- IATA: none; ICAO: SLZF

Summary
- Airport type: Public
- Serves: Naciff
- Elevation AMSL: 482 ft / 147 m
- Coordinates: 13°45′25″S 64°28′18″W

Map
- Location of San Francisco Naciff Airport in Bolivia

Runways
Direction	Length		Surface
Direction	m	ft	Surface
15/33	524	1,720	Grass
- Sources: Landings.com Google Maps GCM

San Francisco Naciff Airport (Spanish: Aeropuerto San Francisco Naciff, (ICAO: SLZF)) is a public use airport near Naciff in the Beni Department of Bolivia.

== See also ==
- Transport in Bolivia
- List of airports in Bolivia
