= Villazon Airport =

Villazón Airport
- IATA: none; ICAO: SLVZ

Summary
- Airport type: Public
- Serves: Villazón
- Location: Bolivia
- Elevation AMSL: 11,260 ft (3,430 m)
- Coordinates: 22°3′10″S 65°38′20″W

Map
- Location of Villazón Airport in Bolivia

Runways
Direction	Length		Surface
Direction	m	ft	Surface
05/23	1,332	4,370	Dirt
- Source: Landings.com Google Maps

Villazón Airport (ICAO: SLVZ) is a high-elevation airport 5 kilometres (3.1 mi) northwest of the city of Villazón in the Potosí Department of Bolivia. The airport and city are in the southeastern reaches of the Bolivian Altiplano, on the border with Argentina.

== See also ==
- Transport in Bolivia
- List of airports in Bolivia
