= Challapata Airport =

Airport in Bolivia

Challapata Airport Collpani Airport
- IATA: none; ICAO: SLCL

Summary
- Airport type: Public
- Serves: Challapata, Bolivia
- Elevation AMSL: 12,185 ft / 3,714 m
- Coordinates: 18°53′00″S 66°47′45″W

Map
- Location of the airport in Bolivia

Runways
Direction	Length		Surface
Direction	m	ft	Surface
12/30	1,730	5,676	Dirt
- Sources: GCM Google Maps

Challapata Airport (ICAO: SLCL) is a high-elevation airport serving the city of Challapata in the Oruro Department of Bolivia.

The airport is 2 kilometres (1.2 mi) northwest of the city. There is mountainous terrain nearby to the east.

== See also ==
- Transport in Bolivia
- List of airports in Bolivia
