= Cañada Airport, Bolivia =

Airport in Bolivia

Cañada Airport La Floresta Airport
- IATA: none; ICAO: SLCD

Summary
- Airport type: Public
- Serves: Estación San Antonio de Parapeti (de), Bolivia
- Elevation AMSL: 1,954 ft / 596 m
- Coordinates: 20°01′40″S 63°05′20″W

Map
- Location of Cañada Airport in Bolivia

Runways
| Direction | Length | | Surface |
| Direction | m | ft | Surface |
|---|---|---|---|
| 18/36 | 2,200 | 7,218 | Grass |
- Sources: Landings.com Google Maps GCM

Cañada Airport, (ICAO: SLCD) is a public airport 9 kilometres (5.6 mi) east of Estación San Antonio de Parapeti (de) in the Santa Cruz Department of Bolivia.

== See also ==
- Transport in Bolivia
- List of airports in Bolivia
