= Santiago Airport (Bolivia) =

- IATA: none; ICAO: SLTG

Summary
- Airport type: Public
- Serves: Santiago
- Elevation AMSL: 780 ft / 238 m
- Coordinates: 15°13′50″S 65°27′05″W

Map
- Location of Santiago Airport in Bolivia

Runways
| Direction | Length | | Surface |
| Direction | m | ft | Surface |
|---|---|---|---|
| 03/21 | 1,370 | 4,495 | Grass |
- Source: Landings.com Google Maps GCM

Santiago Airport (ICAO: SLTG) is a rural airport 33 kilometres (21 mi) southeast of San Ignacio de Moxos in the Beni Department of Bolivia.

== See also ==
- Transport in Bolivia
- List of airports in Bolivia
