= Bella Unión Airport =

Airport near Santa Ana del Yacuma, Bolivia

- IATA: none; ICAO: SLBN

Summary
- Airport type: Public
- Serves: Santa Ana del Yacuma
- Elevation AMSL: 722 ft / 220 m
- Coordinates: 13°37′35″S 65°16′25″W

Map
- Location of Bella Unión Airport in Bolivia

Runways
Direction	Length		Surface
Direction	m	ft	Surface
16/34	635	2,083	Grass
- Source: Landings.com Google Maps

Bella Unión Airport (ICAO: SLBN) is an airstrip 20 kilometres (12 mi) northeast of Santa Ana del Yacuma, a town in the Beni Department of Bolivia. The airstrip is next to a bend in the Mamore River.

The Santa Ana non-directional beacon (Ident: ANA) is located 11.7 nautical miles (21.7 km) southwest of the airstrip.

== See also ==
- Transport in Bolivia
- List of airports in Bolivia
