= Lieutenant Colonel Rafael Pabón Airport =

Airport in Bolivia

Lt. Col. Rafael Pabón Airport Aeropuerto TCNL Rafael Pabón
- IATA: VLM; ICAO: SLVM

Summary
- Airport type: Public
- Operator: Government
- Serves: Villamontes, Bolivia
- Elevation AMSL: 1,306 ft (398 m)
- Coordinates: 21°15′18″S 63°24′20″W

Map
- Location of TNCL Rafael Pabón Airport in Bolivia

Runways
Direction	Length		Surface
Direction	m	ft	Surface
18/36	1,500	4,921	Asphalt
- Sources: AASANA WAD GCM Google Maps

Lieutenant Colonel Rafael Pabón Airport (Spanish: Aeropuerto Teniente Coronel Rafael Pabón, IATA: VLM, ICAO: SLVM) is an airport serving the city of Villamontes in the Gran Chaco Province of the Tarija Department of Bolivia.

The airport is 4 kilometres (2.5 mi) east of the city and 4 kilometres (2.5 mi) north of the Pilcomayo River.

The Villamontes non-directional beacon (Ident: VTS) is located on the field.

== See also ==
- Transport in Bolivia
- List of airports in Bolivia
