= San Matías Airport =

- IATA: MQK; ICAO: SLTI

Summary
- Airport type: Public
- Serves: San Matías, Bolivia
- Elevation AMSL: 406 ft / 124 m
- Coordinates: 16°20′15″S 58°24′05″W

Map
- Location of San Matías Airport in Bolivia

Runways
Direction	Length		Surface
Direction	m	ft	Surface
03/21	1,960	6,430	Grass
- Source: Landings.com Google Maps GCM

San Matías Airport Spanish: Aeropuerto San Matías, (IATA: MQK, ICAO: SLTI) is an airport serving the town of San Matías in the Santa Cruz Department of Bolivia.

The runway is 1.4 kilometres (0.87 mi) north of the town and 3 kilometres (1.9 mi) southeast of Bolivia's border with Brazil.

The San Matias non-directional beacon(Ident: SMT) is located at the north end of the field.

== See also ==
- Transport in Bolivia
- List of airports in Bolivia
