= Cerdas Airport =

- IATA: none; ICAO: SLCS

Summary
- Airport type: Public
- Serves: Cerdas, Bolivia
- Elevation AMSL: 12,640 ft / 3,853 m
- Coordinates: 20°48′30″S 66°24′05″W

Map
- Location of Cerdas Airport in Bolivia

Runways
Direction	Length		Surface
Direction	m	ft	Surface
12/30	2,515	8,251	Grass
- Sources: Landings.com Google Maps

Cerdas Airport (Spanish: Aeropuerto Cerdas, (ICAO: SLCS)) is a high elevation airport serving the village of Cerdas in the Potosí Department of Bolivia. Cerdas is in the Bolivian Altiplano, 23 kilometres (14 mi) northwest of Atocha.

== See also ==
- Transport in Bolivia
- List of airports in Bolivia
