= Covendo =

- Village
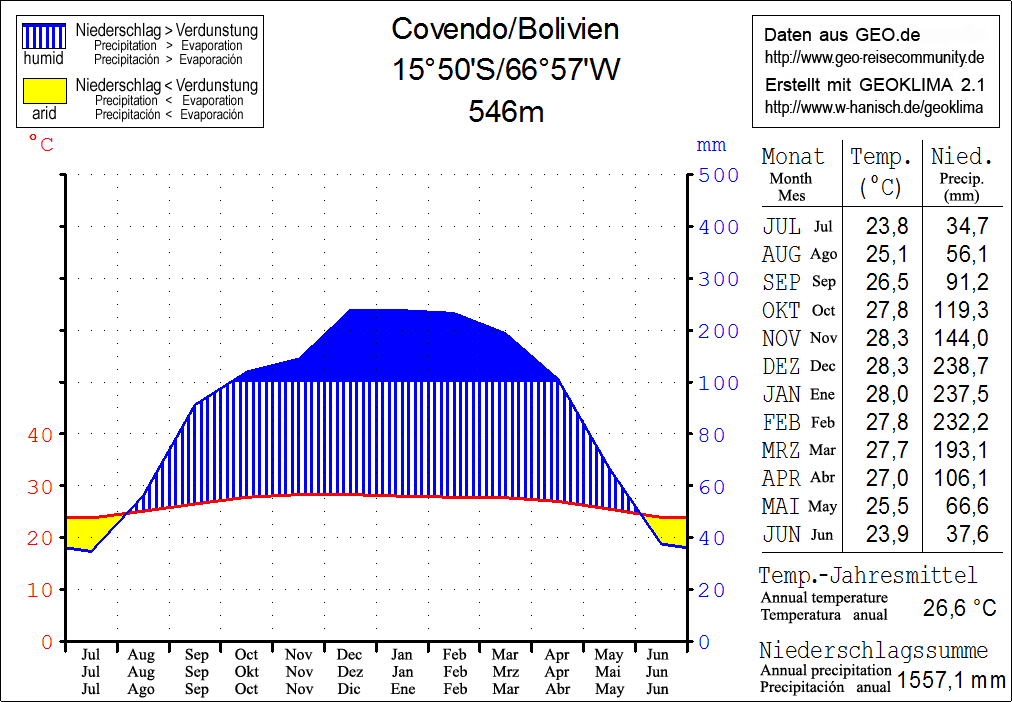
- Climate chart in the Walter and Lieth format, metric, °Celsius und millimeters, made with Geoklima 2.1

- Location within Bolivia
- Coordinates: 15°50′S 66°57′W
- Country: Bolivia
- Department: La Paz Department
- Province: Sud Yungas Province
- Municipality: Palos Blancos Municipality
- Elevation: 1,697 ft (517 m)

Population (2001)
  - Total: 517
- Time zone: UTC-4 (BOT)

Covendo is a village in the La Paz Department of Bolivia. It is in the valley of the upper Beni River (Alto Beni) in the Bolivian Andes.

In 2001 it had a population of 517.

It is served by Covendo Airport.
