= Santa Ana de Huachi Airport =

- IATA: none; ICAO: SLSH

Summary
- Airport type: Public
- Serves: Santa Ana de Mosetenes
- Elevation AMSL: 1,272 ft / 388 m
- Coordinates: 15°29′40″S 67°26′35″W

Map
- Location of Santa Ana de Huachi Airport in Bolivia

Runways
Direction	Length		Surface
Direction	m	ft	Surface
12/30	1,550	5,085	Grass
- Source: Landings.com Google Maps GCM

Santa Ana de Huachi Airport (ICAO: SLSH) is an airstrip serving the river port village of Santa Ana de Mosetenes (de), in the La Paz Department of Bolivia. The village was formerly named Santa Ana de Huachi.

The runway is 2 kilometres (1.2 mi) northwest of Santa Ana, across the upper Beni River. There is moderately rising terrain nearby to the north and west.

== See also ==
- Transport in Bolivia
- List of airports in Bolivia
