= Intiraymi Airport =

- IATA: none; ICAO: SLIY

Summary
- Airport type: Public
- Serves: La Joya, Bolivia
- Elevation AMSL: 12,467 ft / 3,800 m
- Coordinates: 17°47′45″S 67°26′05″W

Map
- Location of Intiraymi Airport in Bolivia

Runways
Direction	Length		Surface
Direction	m	ft	Surface
17/35	3,185	10,449	Gravel, asphalt
- Source: Landings.com Google Maps GCM

Intiraymi Airport (ICAO: SLIY) is an extremely high elevation airport serving the Franklin Mining, Inc. silver and gold mining concession at La Joya in the Oruro Department of Bolivia.

The airport is in the Bolivian altiplano, 38 kilometres (24 mi) northwest of Oruro city. There is high terrain southeast of the runway.

== See also ==
- Transport in Bolivia
- List of airports in Bolivia
