= El Dorado Airport (Bolivia) =

- IATA: none; ICAO: SLED

Summary
- Airport type: Public
- Serves: El Dorado, Bolivia
- Elevation AMSL: 530 ft / 162 m
- Coordinates: 13°04′13″S 67°09′50″W

Map
- Location of the airport in Bolivia

Runways
Direction	Length		Surface
Direction	m	ft	Surface
08/26	500	1,640	Grass
- Sources: GCM Google Maps

El Dorado Airport (ICAO: SLED) is an airstrip serving the river settlement of El Dorado in the La Paz Department of Bolivia. The airport is alongside a tributary stream 1 kilometre (0.62 mi) west of the Beni River.

Google Earth Historical Imagery (December 1969) shows the runway may have been up to 1,100 metres (3,600 ft) long, but large trees have cut that to 500 metres (1,600 ft) usable.

== See also ==
- Transport in Bolivia
- List of airports in Bolivia
