= Chacobos Airport =

- IATA: none; ICAO: SLHS

Summary
- Airport type: Closed
- Serves: Parapeti, Bolivia
- Elevation AMSL: 1,437 ft / 438 m
- Coordinates: 19°35′59″S 62°33′48″W

Map
- Location of Chacobos Airport in Bolivia

Runways
Direction	Length		Surface
Direction	ft	m	Surface
Closed
- Source: Landings.com

Chacobos Airport (ICAO: SLHS) was a rural airstrip near Parapeti, Santa Cruz, Bolivia.

Published Bing, HERE, OpenStreetMap, and Google aerial images show the runway is overgrown with trees and brush.

== See also ==
- Transport in Bolivia
- List of airports in Bolivia
