= Rancho Alegre Airport =

- IATA: none; ICAO: SLRH

Summary
- Airport type: Private
- Serves: Rancho Alegre, Bolivia
- Elevation AMSL: 470 ft / 143 m
- Coordinates: 12°11′05″S 65°48′38″W

Map
- Location of Rancho Alegre Airport in Bolivia

Runways
Direction	Length		Surface
Direction	m	ft	Surface
01/19	591	1,939	Grass
- Source: Landings.com Google Maps GCM

Rancho Alegre Airport (ICAO: SLRH) is an airstrip serving Rancho Alegre, a ranch in the Beni Department of Bolivia.

== See also ==
- Transport in Bolivia
- List of airports in Bolivia
