= Florida Airport (Bolivia) =

- IATA: none; ICAO: SLFL

Summary
- Airport type: Public
- Serves: Moira
- Elevation AMSL: 600 ft / 183 m
- Coordinates: 14°36′25″S 61°11′55″W

Map
- Location of Florida Airport in Bolivia

Runways
Direction	Length		Surface
Direction	m	ft	Surface
18/36	1,170	3,839	Grass
- Sources: Landings.com Google Maps GCM

Florida Airport (ICAO: SLFL) is an airstrip next to the village of Moira in the Santa Cruz Department of Bolivia.

== See also ==
- Transport in Bolivia
- List of airports in Bolivia
