= Manuel María Caballero Province =

Province of Santa Cruz, Bolivia

Provincia Manuel María Caballero
- Province
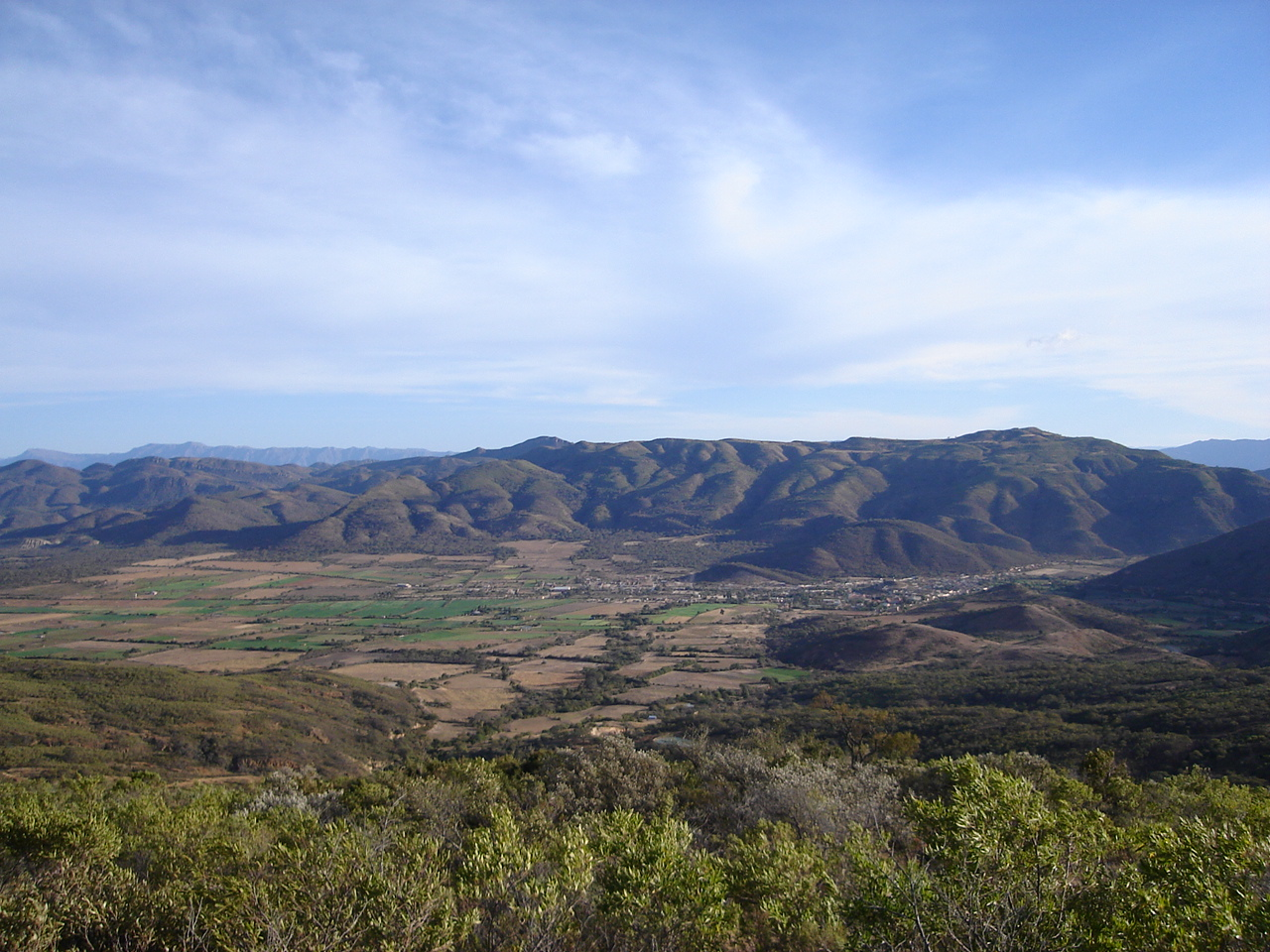
- Panoramic view of Comarapa
- Interactive map of Provincia Manuel María Caballero
- Country: Bolivia
- Department: Santa Cruz

Area
  - Total: 2,310 km^{2} (890 sq mi)

Population (2024)
  - Total: 23,189
  - Density: 10.0/km^{2} (26.0/sq mi)
- ISO 3166 code: BO.SC.MC

Manuel María Caballero Province is one of the fifteen provinces of the Bolivian Santa Cruz Department and is situated in the department's western parts. The province name honors deputy Manuel María Caballero from Vallegrande, one of the signatories of the Bolivian constitution (Constitución política) of 5 August 1861. Its capital is Comarapa.

== Location ==
Manuel María Caballero Province is located between 17° 26' and 18° 15' South and between 64° 07' and 64° 50' West. It extends over 90 km from North to South, and 75 km from West to East.

The province is situated on the western edge of the Bolivian lowlands and borders Cochabamba Department in the West, Vallegrande Province in the South, Florida Province in the East, and Ichilo Province in the Northeast.

== Population ==
The population of Manuel María Caballero Province has increased by circa 35% over the recent two decades:

- 1992: 16,074 inhabitants (census)
- 2001: 20,562 inhabitants (census)
- 2005: 21,517 inhabitants (est.)
- 2010: 22,916 inhabitants (est.)
- 2024: 23,189 inhabitants (census)

In 1992, 95.4% of the population spoke Spanish, 43.8% spoke Quechua, and 1.6 spoke Aymara. 44.9% of the population was younger than 15 years old and 20% were considered part of the urban population. 90.1% were Catholics and 8.4% were Protestants. 70.1% of the population had no access to electricity and 70.8% had no sanitary facilities.

== Division ==
The province comprises two municipios:

- Comarapa Municipality – 14,660 inhabitants (2001)
- Saipina Municipality – 5,350 inhabitants (2001)
