= San Juan Airport (Bolivia) =

- IATA: none; ICAO: SLJN

Summary
- Airport type: Public
- Serves: San Juan, Bolivia
- Location: Bolivia
- Elevation AMSL: 820 ft / 250 m
- Coordinates: 14°9′46.6″S 64°45′31.7″W

Map
- Location of San Juan Airport in Bolivia

Runways
Direction	Length		Surface
Direction	ft	m	Surface
13/31	1,960	597	Grass
- Source: Landings.com

San Juan Airport (ICAO: SLJN) is a public use airport located near San Juan, Beni, Bolivia.

== See also ==
- Transport in Bolivia
- List of airports in Bolivia
