= Abapó =

- Town
- Location within Bolivia
- Coordinates: 18°54′20″S 63°24′00″W
- Country: Bolivia
- Department: Santa Cruz
- Province: Cordillera
- Elevation: 1,460 ft (450 m)

Population
  - Total: 3,140
- Time zone: UTC-4 (BOT)
- Postal code: 07-0703-0100-1001
- Area code: (+591)
- Climate: Aw
- Sources: Google Maps OSM

Abapó is a town in the Santa Cruz Department of Bolivia. The town is just short of the eastern foothills of the Andes mountains, and on the north bank of the Rio Grande, which runs east then turns north to drain into the Amazon Basin.

A rail line and major highway cross the river at Abapó.

== Climate ==
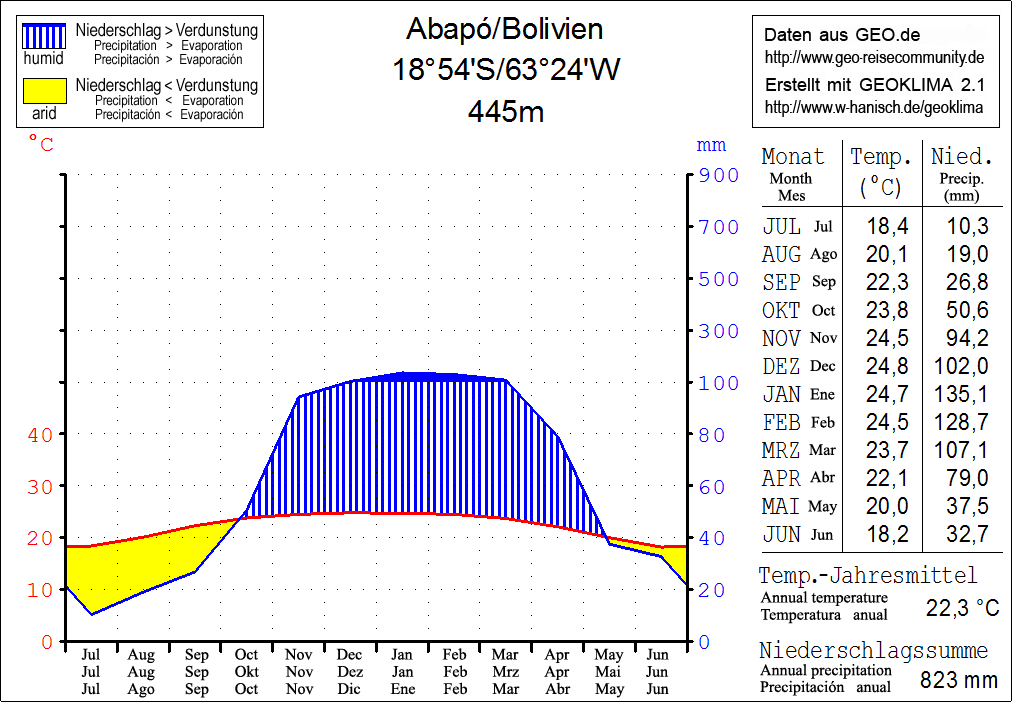

Abapó is in the tropical climate range, with a six-month humid season from November to April and a dry season from May to October.

The average annual temperature is 23 °C, with 17 to 18 °C from June to July and over 26 °C from November to December. The annual precipitation is a good 800 mm, the wettest months being January and February with about 130 mm and the driest months July and August with 10 to 20 mm.

Climate data for Abapó, elevation 440 m (1,440 ft), (1977–2013)
Month	Jan	Feb	Mar	Apr	May	Jun	Jul	Aug	Sep	Oct	Nov	Dec	Year
Mean daily maximum °C (°F)	34.7 (94.5)	34.3 (93.7)	33.5 (92.3)	32.3 (90.1)	28.0 (82.4)	26.6 (79.9)	27.9 (82.2)	31.9 (89.4)	35.7 (96.3)	35.6 (96.1)	36.0 (96.8)	36.0 (96.8)	32.7 (90.9)
Daily mean °C (°F)	29.3 (84.7)	28.1 (82.6)	27.3 (81.1)	26.0 (78.8)	22.2 (72.0)	20.2 (68.4)	20.6 (69.1)	23.6 (74.5)	27.4 (81.3)	28.3 (82.9)	28.7 (83.7)	29.7 (85.5)	26.0 (78.7)
Mean daily minimum °C (°F)	23.9 (75.0)	21.9 (71.4)	21.2 (70.2)	19.7 (67.5)	16.5 (61.7)	13.5 (56.3)	13.3 (55.9)	15.3 (59.5)	19.1 (66.4)	21.1 (70.0)	21.4 (70.5)	23.5 (74.3)	19.2 (66.6)
Average precipitation mm (inches)	149.3 (5.88)	134.4 (5.29)	108.3 (4.26)	77.1 (3.04)	58.2 (2.29)	38.7 (1.52)	17.7 (0.70)	9.3 (0.37)	24.9 (0.98)	58.4 (2.30)	91.0 (3.58)	139.9 (5.51)	907.2 (35.72)
Average precipitation days	8.9	8.2	8.0	6.6	6.3	4.6	2.8	1.4	2.2	4.2	6.3	7.8	67.3
Source: Servicio Nacional de Meteorología e Hidrología de Bolivia

== Infrastructure ==
Abapó is located 142 kilometres by road south of Santa Cruz, the capital of the department of the same name.

From Santa Cruz, the paved highway Ruta 9 leads south via Cabezas to Abapó and for another 405 kilometres via Ipitá and Villamontes to Yacuiba on the Bolivian border with Argentina.

Abapó is also a stop on the railway line from Santa Cruz to Yacuiba. From Abapó, there are passenger train connections in both northern and southern directions, which transport passengers to Santa Cruz in about three hours and to Yacuiba in twelve hours.

== Population Development ==
The population of the village has more than tripled in the past two decades.

Year	Population
1992	731
2001	2 218
2012	2 386

Due to the historical population distribution, the region still has a certain proportion of indigenous population: In the Municipio Cabezas, 9.0 percent of the population speak the Quechua language and 6.8 percent the Guaraní language.
