= Comarapa =

- Location serving as a municipality
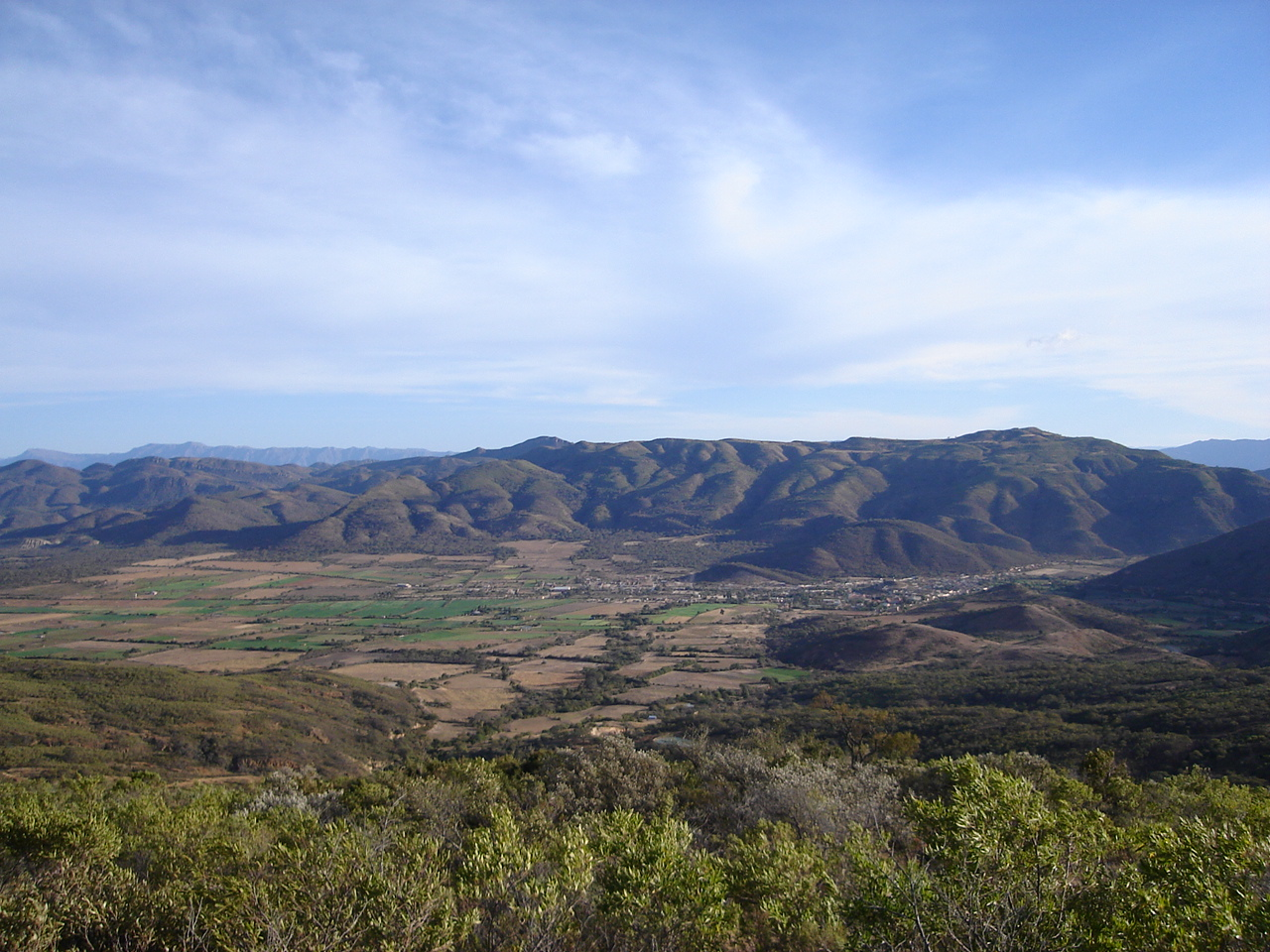

- Location in Bolivia
- Coordinates: 17°54′57″S 64°31′48″W
- Country: Bolivia
- Department: Santa Cruz
- Province: Manuel María Caballero
- Elevation: 1,825 m (5,988 ft)

Population (2009)
  - Total: 5,793
- Time zone: UTC-4 (BOT)
- Climate: BSk

Comarapa is a location that serves as a municipality in Bolivia. In 2009 it had an estimated population of 5,793. It is located roughly halfway between Cochabamba and Santa Cruz.

== Climate ==
Climate data for Comarapa, elevation 1,814 m (5,951 ft), (1973–2013)
Month	Jan	Feb	Mar	Apr	May	Jun	Jul	Aug	Sep	Oct	Nov	Dec	Year
Record high °C (°F)	36.0 (96.8)	34.0 (93.2)	33.0 (91.4)	32.4 (90.3)	34.0 (93.2)	34.5 (94.1)	33.2 (91.8)	32.5 (90.5)	33.4 (92.1)	35.6 (96.1)	33.0 (91.4)	35.2 (95.4)	36.0 (96.8)
Mean daily maximum °C (°F)	26.1 (79.0)	25.5 (77.9)	25.5 (77.9)	24.4 (75.9)	23.5 (74.3)	23.0 (73.4)	22.3 (72.1)	23.1 (73.6)	24.1 (75.4)	25.1 (77.2)	25.6 (78.1)	26.2 (79.2)	24.5 (76.2)
Daily mean °C (°F)	20.2 (68.4)	19.6 (67.3)	19.5 (67.1)	18.1 (64.6)	16.4 (61.5)	15.7 (60.3)	15.0 (59.0)	16.4 (61.5)	17.6 (63.7)	19.2 (66.6)	19.6 (67.3)	20.4 (68.7)	18.1 (64.7)
Mean daily minimum °C (°F)	14.3 (57.7)	13.8 (56.8)	13.4 (56.1)	11.8 (53.2)	9.2 (48.6)	8.4 (47.1)	7.8 (46.0)	9.8 (49.6)	11.1 (52.0)	13.3 (55.9)	13.6 (56.5)	14.5 (58.1)	11.8 (53.1)
Record low °C (°F)	6.5 (43.7)	5.0 (41.0)	0.9 (33.6)	0.6 (33.1)	0.0 (32.0)	−5.0 (23.0)	−5.0 (23.0)	−1.5 (29.3)	0.0 (32.0)	0.0 (32.0)	0.7 (33.3)	0.5 (32.9)	−5.0 (23.0)
Average precipitation mm (inches)	122.7 (4.83)	101.1 (3.98)	70.1 (2.76)	40.0 (1.57)	9.0 (0.35)	8.5 (0.33)	8.5 (0.33)	10.1 (0.40)	18.6 (0.73)	38.2 (1.50)	52.9 (2.08)	97.4 (3.83)	577.1 (22.69)
Average precipitation days	10.9	11.0	9.0	6.2	4.6	3.2	2.9	2.2	3.2	5.4	6.4	8.7	73.7
Average relative humidity (%)	76.4	80.2	81.2	82.7	81.7	75.5	72.4	73.2	72.3	71.7	72.0	72.2	76.0
Source: Servicio Nacional de Meteorología e Hidrología de Bolivia
