= Santa Rosa del Sara =

Coordinates: 17°07′S 63°35′W

- Town
- Interactive map of Santa Rosa del Sara
- Country: Bolivia
- Department: Santa Cruz Department
- Province: Sara Province
- Municipality: Santa Rosa del Sara Municipality

Population (2001)
  - Total: 4,119
- Time zone: UTC-4 (BOT)

Santa Rosa del Sara is a small town in Bolivia.
