= Apere River =

Coordinates: 15°43′32″S 66°2′46″W

Location
- Country: Bolivia

Physical characteristics
- Length: c. 500 km (310 mi)

The Apere River is a river of Bolivia. It is a tributary of the Mamoré River, in the Department of Beni.

== See also ==
- List of rivers of Bolivia
