= Santa Rosa de Yacuma =

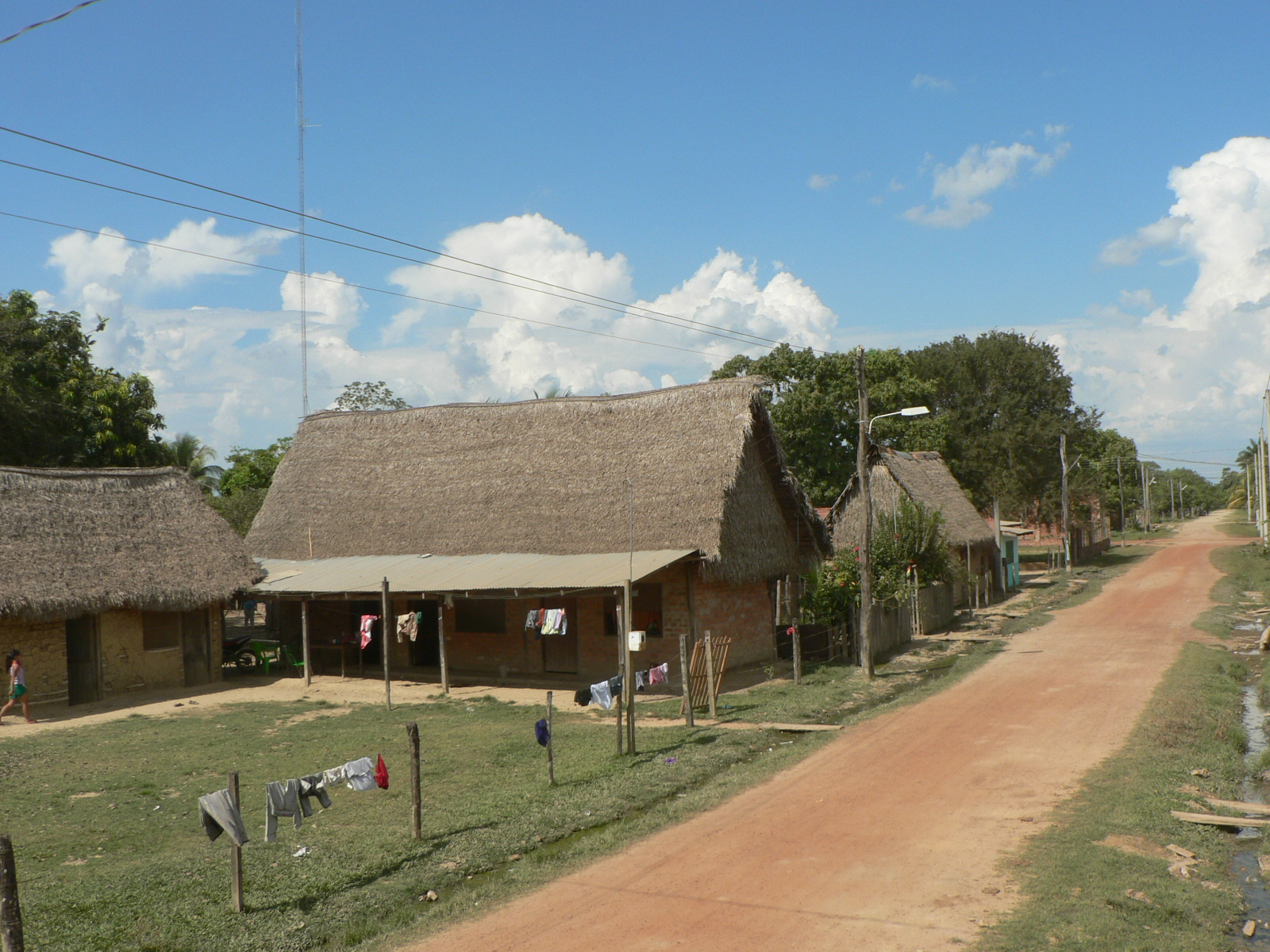
- Santa Rosa de(l) Yacuma

- Location in Bolivia
- Coordinates: 14°04′40″S 66°47′37″W
- Country: Bolivia
- Department: Beni Department
- Province: José Ballivián Province
- Elevation: 548 ft (167 m)

Population (2001)
  - Total: 4,319
- Time zone: UTC-4 (BOT)

Santa Rosa de Yacuma or Santa Rosa del Yacuma (short: Santa Rosa) is a small town in the Amazon pampas of the Bolivian Beni Department.

== Location ==
Santa Rosa de Yacuma is the administrative center of the Santa Rosa Municipality in the José Ballivián Province. It is located on the left banks of Yacuma River, 230 km north-west of Trinidad, the department's capital. Nearest towns are Reyes, Bolivia, a two hours' drive on a poor road to the south-west, and Rurrenabaque 100 km to the south-west.

West of Santa Rosa there is a fresh water lake of 7 km length and 4 km width, and 20 km north-west of the town there is 155 km^{2} large Laguna Rogagua, together with the pampas at Yacuma River popular tourist destinations in the region.

== Population ==
In the 2001 census, Santa Rosa had a population of 4,319 inhabitants in the 2001 census, and an estimated 4.831 in 2008.
