= List of airports by ICAO code: SK-SM =

List of airports by ICAO code: A - B - C - D - EB-EG - EH-EY - FA-FM - FN-FZ - G - H - ~~I~~ - J - KA-KH - KI-KP - KR-KZ - LA-LJ - LK-LZ - M - N - O - P - Q - R - SA-SC - SD-SH - SI - SJ - SK-SM - SN-SP - SQ - SS-SU - SV-SY - T - U - V - W - ~~X~~ - Y - Z

== SK - Colombia ==
Also see airport category and list.

ICAO	IATA	Airport name	Community	Coordinates	Notes
SKAA		Caño Garza Airport	Caño Garza	05°35′30″N 071°35′22″W	
SKAB		Malabares Aerodrome	Trinidad	05°28′08″N 071°22′10″W	
SKAC	ACR	Araracuara Airport	Araracuara	00°36′03″S 072°23′53″W	
SKAD	ACD	Alcides Fernández Airport	Acandí	08°29′53″N 077°16′26″W	
SKAE		Bonaire Aerodrome	Ayapel	08°17′30″N 075°03′12″W	
SKAF		San Francisco Aerodrome	Garzón	02°18′18″N 075°38′40″W	Closed
SKAG	ACL	Hacaritama Airport	Aguachica	08°14′46″N 073°34′51″W	
SKAH		Cachimbalito Aerodrome	Villa Rica	03°09′56″N 076°28′27″W	
SKAI		Las Acacias Aerodrome	Nemocón	05°05′44″N 073°54′19″W	
SKAJ		San Jacinto de Padilla Aerodrome	Padilla	03°11′09″N 076°19′34″W	
SKAK		Ataco Aerodrome	Yopal	03°35′01″N 075°23′21″W	
SKAL		Calenturitas Airport	Calenturitas	09°39′12″N 073°29′41″W	
SKAM	AFI	Amalfi Airport	Amalfi	06°53′44″N 075°02′51″W	
SKAN	ADN	Andes Airport	Andes	05°41′52″N 075°52′49″W	
SKAO		El Paraíso Airport	Aguachica	08°07′33″N 073°34′50″W	
SKAP	API	Gomez Nino-Apiay Airport	Apiay	04°04′34″N 073°33′46″W	
SKAQ		La Providencia Aerodrome	Ituango	07°09′55″N 075°43′31″W	
SKAR	AXM	El Edén International Airport	Armenia	04°27′06″N 075°45′58″W	
SKAS	PUU	Tres de Mayo Airport	Puerto Asís	00°30′21″N 076°30′03″W	
SKAT	ARQ	El Troncal Airport	Arauquita	07°01′16″N 071°23′20″W	
SKAU		Andalucia Aerodrome	Villavicencio	03°59′17″N 073°17′58″W	
SKAV		Avianca Headquarters Heliport	Bogotá	04°38′44″N 074°05′59″W	
SKAW		Aguaclara Aerodrome	Paratebueno	04°44′00″N 073°03′30″W	Closed
SKAX		Campo el Palomar Aerodrome	Montenegro	04°33′04″N 075°44′25″W	
SKAY		La Atarraya Aerodrome	Ayapel	08°17′10″N 075°05′47″W	Closed
SKAZ		General Adelmo Ruiz Mares Aerodrome	Ricaurte	04°21′00″N 074°45′04″W	
SKBA		Buenos Aires Aerodrome	Sabana de Torres	07°27′44″N 073°44′47″W	
SKBB		Belgrado Airport	Maní, Casanare	04°47′05″N 072°18′04″W	
SKBC	ELB	Las Flores Airport	El Banco	09°02′41″N 073°58′25″W	
SKBD		Tibiri Aerodrome	Puerto Gaitán	03°57′00″N 071°08′00″W	Coordinates unverified
SKBE		Becerril Airport	Becerril	09°39′46″N 073°16′28″W	
SKBF		Banco Cafetero Heliport	Manizales	05°04′13″N 075°31′44″W	Closed
SKBG	BGA	Palonegro International Airport	Lebrija (near Bucaramanga)	07°07′36″N 073°11′05″W	
SKBH		Bello Horizonte Aerodrome	Puerto López	04°17′30″N 072°30′15″W	
SKBI		Dubai Aerodrome	Ayapel	08°17′45″N 075°01′50″W	Closed
SKBJ		La Abejita Aerodrome	Maní	05°00′34″N 072°19′24″W	
SKBK		Bebea Aerodrome	Maní	04°42′33″N 072°22′43″W	
SKBL		Banco de la República Heliport	Medellín	06°15′10″N 075°34′26″W	Closed
SKBM	NBB	Barranco Minas Airport	Barranco Minas	03°39′26″N 069°48′35″W	
SKBN		Buenavista Air Base	Distracción / Fonseca	10°53′15″N 072°54′03″W	
SKBO	BOG	El Dorado International Airport	Bogotá	04°42′06″N 074°08′49″W	
SKBP		Guaicaramo Aerodrome	Barranca de Upía	04°27′38″N 072°57′04″W	
SKBQ	BAQ	Ernesto Cortissoz International Airport	Barranquilla	10°53′19″N 074°46′54″W	
SKBR		Berástegui Airport	Berástegui	08°53′04″N 075°41′01″W	
SKBS	BSC	José Celestino Mutis Airport	Bahía Solano	06°12′11″N 077°23′42″W	
SKBT		Buena Vista Aerodrome	Orocué	04°50′39″N 071°30′29″W	
SKBU	BUN	Gerardo Tobar López Airport	Buenaventura	03°49′10″N 076°59′24″W	
SKBV		Bavaria Heliport	Bogotá	04°40′40″N 074°02′50″W	Closed
SKBW		Bungalow Heliport	Marinilla	06°10′25″N 075°18′28″W	
SKBY		Bari Aeroclub Aerodrome	Cúcuta	08°09′26″N 072°27′50″W	
SKBZ		Cabaralez Aerodrome	Puerto Wilches	07°19′43″N 073°47′35″W	
SKCA	CPB	Capurganá Airport	Capurganá	08°37′50″N 077°21′01″W	
SKCB		El Carmen de Bolívar Airport	El Carmen de Bolívar	09°40′54″N 075°07′28″W	
SKCC	CUC	Camilo Daza International Airport	Cúcuta	07°55′39″N 072°30′42″W	
SKCD	COG	Mandinga Airport	Condoto	05°04′19″N 076°40′36″W	
SKCE		Cruz Verde Airport	Ibagué	04°23′23″N 075°07′51″W	
SKCF		El Cafuche Aerodrome	La Primavera	05°18′55″N 070°01′06″W	
SKCG	CTG	Rafael Núñez International Airport	Cartagena	10°26′31″N 075°30′46″W	
SKCH		El Pacifico Aerodrome	Cartagena del Chairá	00°49′25″N 074°36′54″W	Closed
SKCI	CCO	Carimagua Airport	Carimagua	04°33′54″N 071°20′12″W	
SKCJ		Caño Colorado de Puerto Colombia Aerodrome	Puerto Colombia	02°16′39″N 068°21′36″W	
SKCK		Andino Commercial Centre Heliport	Bogotá	04°40′09″N 074°03′22″W	Closed
SKCL	CLO	Alfonso Bonilla Aragón International Airport	Cali	03°32′35″N 076°22′54″W	
SKCM	CIM	Cimitarra Airport	Cimitarra	06°22′03″N 073°58′14″W	
SKCN	RAV	Cravo Norte Airport	Cravo Norte	06°19′00″N 070°12′40″W	
SKCO	TCO	La Florida Airport	Tumaco	01°48′52″N 078°44′57″W	
SKCP	BHF	Bahía Cupica Airport	Bahía Cupica	06°41′55″N 077°29′00″W	
SKCQ		Los Cactus Aerodrome	Lérida	04°48′22″N 074°59′15″W	Closed
SKCR	CUO	Carurú Airport	Carurú	01°00′48″N 071°17′46″W	
SKCS		Cusiana Aerodrome	Tauramena	04°57′48″N 072°37′41″W	
SKCT		La Carmelita Aerodrome	Lérida	04°48′58″N 074°55′55″W	Closed
SKCU	CAQ	Juan H. White Airport	Caucasia	07°58′03″N 075°11′53″W	
SKCV	CVE	Coveñas Airport	Coveñas	09°24′04″N 075°41′29″W	
SKCX		Santa Clara de Puerto Gaitán Aerodrome	Puerto Gaitán	04°19′58″N 071°43′35″W	
SKCY		Casacara Cayta Aerodrome	Agustín Codazzi	09°55′43″N 073°15′11″W	
SKCZ	CZU	Las Brujas Airport	Corozal	09°19′57″N 075°17′07″W	
SKDA		Ingenia Risaralda Aerodrome	Balboa	04°53′40″N 075°54′17″W	
SKDB		Dorotea Aerodrome B1	Paz de Ariporo	05°30′44″N 071°01′29″W	
SKDD		Drummond Heliport	Ciénaga	11°03′34″N 074°12′40″W	
SKDE		El Diamante de Pereira Aerodrome	Pereira	04°49′25″N 075°50′43″W	
SKDG		La Ponderosa Aerodrome	Puerto Gaitán	04°37′54″N 071°12′51″W	
SKDI		La Trinidad de Puerto Rico Aerodrome	Puerto Rico	02°57′57″N 073°10′35″W	
SKDJ		Candilejas Aerodrome	Montenegro	04°29′13″N 075°47′50″W	
SKDL		La Bandola Aerodrome	Maní	04°51′24″N 072°15′31″W	
SKDM		Austria Aerodrome	La Primavera	05°22′55″N 069°47′50″W	
SKDN		El Danubio Aerodrome	Hato Corozal	06°15′41″N 071°13′37″W	
SKDP		Cerro de Piedra Aerodrome	La Jagua de Ibirico	09°33′33″N 073°17′28″W	
SKDQ		San Luis de Quenane Aerodrome	Villavicencio	04°02′55″N 073°11′28″W	
SKDR		La Candelaria de Fuente de Oro Aerodrome	Fuente de Oro / Granada	03°25′17″N 073°43′33″W	
SKDS		Edgar Caldas Potes Aerodrome	Calima	03°54′57″N 076°28′53″W	
SKDT		El Diamante de San Carlos De Guaroa	San Carlos de Guaroa	03°53′05″N 073°09′35″W	
SKDU		Caño Gandul Airport	Caño Gandul	05°10′21″N 071°08′31″W	
SKDV		La Diva Aerodrome	Santa Marta	11°14′41″N 073°42′59″W	
SKDZ		El Pedral Bonanza Aerodrome	Puerto Wilches	07°14′30″N 073°48′55″W	
SKEA		El Caiman Aerodrome	Orocué	04°51′16″N 071°40′53″W	
SKEB	EBG	El Bagre Airport	El Bagre	07°35′42″N 074°48′32″W	
SKEE		Beneficencia del Tolima Heliport	Ibagué	04°26′35″N 075°14′29″W	
SKEF		El Colegio Aerosport Aerodrome	Flandes	04°14′03″N 074°50′05″W	
SKEG		El Guayabal Aerodrome	Patía	02°04′48″N 076°58′29″W	
SKEH	ECR	El Charco Airport	El Charco	02°26′27″N 078°06′00″W	
SKEI		El Dolar Aerodrome	Paz de Ariporo	05°31′08″N 071°09′43″W	
SKEJ	EJA	Yariguíes Airport	Barrancabermeja	07°01′28″N 073°48′25″W	
SKEK		Pore Aerodrome	Pore	05°43′00″N 071°57′00″W	Coordinates unverified
SKEL		El Tambo Aerodrome	Cartagena	10°28′54″N 075°25′01″W	
SKEM		El Milagro Aerodrome	Buga	03°51′14″N 076°20′14″W	Closed
SKEN		El Gavilán Airport	La Primavera	05°15′20″N 069°44′04″W	
SKEO		El Boral Aerodrome	Orocué	04°44′18″N 071°30′43″W	
SKEP		El Porvenir de Pijiño del Carmen Aerodrome	Pijiño	09°29′28″N 074°11′27″W	
SKEQ		El Bosque Aerodrome	San Alberto, Cesar	07°48′38″N 073°26′54″W	Closed
SKER		El Porvenir de Aguazul Aerodrome	Aguazul	05°11′59″N 072°24′24″W	
SKES		Los Andes Aerodrome	Villa de Leyva	05°37′30″N 073°33′20″W	
SKET		La Carpeta Aerodrome	Paz de Ariporo	05°57′31″N 070°56′24″W	Closed
SKEU		Teucali Aerodrome	Piedras	04°25′32″N 075°01′25″W	Closed
SKEV		El Viejo Carmen Aerodrome	Orocué	04°53′52″N 071°34′05″W	
SKEX		Expopalmira Aerodrome	Palmira	03°30′23″N 076°19′54″W	Closed
SKEY		El Araguaney Airport	Yopal	05°24′47″N 072°17′06″W	
SKEZ		La Esperanza de Puerto Libertador Aerodrome	Puerto Libertador	07°52′08″N 075°40′32″W	
SKFA		San Rafael de Agrado Aerodrome	Agrado	02°14′30″N 075°39′36″W	
SKFB		El Faro Aerodrome	Aguachica	08°13′25″N 073°36′45″W	
SKFC		Colombia Cardiovascular Foundation Heliport	Floridablanca	07°04′22″N 073°06′35″W	
SKFD		Gutierrez Foundry Heliport	Medellín	06°14′15″N 075°34′17″W	
SKFE		Frontino El Plateado Aerodrome	Frontino	06°43′20″N 076°08′48″W	Closed
SKFF		Fortul Aerodrome	Fortul	06°46′54″N 071°46′45″W	
SKFG		Los Feria Girón Aerodrome	San Luis	04°15′30″N 075°00′33″W	
SKFI		Escobar Foundry Heliport	Medellín	06°14′49″N 075°34′35″W	Closed
SKFJ		Captain Julio Cesar Sanabria Rivera Air Base	Flandes	04°15′36″N 074°51′01″W	
SKFL	FLA	Gustavo Artunduaga Paredes Airport	Florencia	01°35′21″N 075°33′51″W	
SKFM		Alfemar Aerodrome	Juradó	07°00′31″N 077°40′02″W	Abandoned
SKFN		Fiscalia General de la Nacion Heliport	Medellín	06°16′03″N 075°34′26″W	
SKFO		El Refugio Aerodrome	Los Santos	06°50′22″N 073°05′06″W	
SKFP		San Felipe Aerodrome	San Felipe	01°55′04″N 067°04′41″W	
SKFR		Furatena Airport	Quípama	05°31′20″N 074°10′56″W	
SKFS		Afganistan Aerodrome	Paz de Ariporo	05°52′42″N 071°24′29″W	Closed
SKFT		El Trinidad Aerodrome	Trinidad, Casanare	05°30′05″N 071°46′59″W	Closed
SKFU	FDA	Fundación Aerodrome	Fundación	10°32′00″N 074°12′00″W	Coordinates unverified
SKFV		Fundación Valle de Lili Heliport	Cali	03°22′24″N 076°31′35″W	
SKFZ		La Fortuna Aerodrome	Puerto López	04°06′10″N 072°58′41″W	
SKGA	LGT	Las Gaviotas Airport	Gaviotas	04°33′02″N 070°55′32″W	
SKGB		Marco Fidel Suárez Air Base	Cali	03°27′32″N 076°29′47″W	
SKGC		El Lago Aerodrome	Piedras	04°33′27″N 074°54′01″W	Closed
SKGD		Gemelos Dorados Aerodrome	Puerto Wilches	07°14′48″N 073°46′19″W	
SKGE		San German Aerodrome	Natagaima	03°39′03″N 075°06′01″W	
SKGF		Gaviotas Aerodrome	Fuente de Oro	03°27′48″N 073°36′08″W	
SKGG		Papunahua Aerodrome	Papunahua	01°54′26″N 070°45′43″W	Also SQMF
SKGH		Guadualito Aerodrome	Nunchía	05°27′40″N 071°54′43″W	
SKGI	GIR	Santiago Vila Airport	Girardot	04°16′31″N 074°47′46″W	
SKGJ		Gabrielas Aerodrome	Jamundí	03°10′47″N 076°33′03″W	
SKGK		San Gerardo de Mitú Aerodrome	Mitú	00°46′11″N 070°17′05″W	
SKGL		La Gloria Aerodrome	Aguazul	05°00′23″N 072°21′22″W	
SKGM		La Lucha Aerodrome	Ciénaga	10°58′15″N 074°11′03″W	
SKGN		Las Guabinas Aerodrome	Orocué	04°42′39″N 071°33′01″W	
SKGO	CRC	Santa Ana Airport	Cartago	04°45′30″N 075°57′22″W	
SKGP	GPI	Guapi Airport	Guapi	02°34′12″N 077°53′53″W	
SKGQ		Guarilaque Aerodrome	Orocué	04°53′31″N 071°35′12″W	
SKGR		Yaguarito Aerodrome	San Carlos de Guaroa	03°52′54″N 073°20′24″W	
SKGS		Los Gavanes Aerodrome	Arauca	07°00′27″N 070°46′31″W	
SKGT		Ganaderie El Triunfo Aerodrome	Honda, Tolima	05°10′08″N 074°45′56″W	
SKGU		Guadalajara Aerodrome	Ibagué	04°21′57″N 075°09′24″W	
SKGV		Guayabal del Cravo Aerodrome	Orocué	04°43′22″N 071°35′39″W	
SKGW		Guamitos de Castilla la Nueva Aerodrome	Castilla la Nueva	03°49′40″N 073°28′35″W	Closed
SKGX		El Gilgal Aerodrome	Unguía	08°12′00″N 077°05′00″W	Coordinates unverified
SKGY		Flaminio Suárez Camacho Airport	Bogotá / Chía	04°48′45″N 074°03′54″W	
SKGZ		Garzón Airport	Garzón	02°08′47″N 075°41′39″W	
SKHA	CPL	General Navas Pardo Airport	Chaparral	03°43′26″N 075°27′55″W	
SKHB		La Herrera Aerodrome	Planadas	03°13′00″N 075°51′00″W	Coordinates unverified
SKHC	HTZ	Hato Corozal Airport	Hato Corozal	06°09′13″N 071°45′42″W	
SKHD		Hipilandia Airport	San Martín	07°53′24″N 073°27′32″W	
SKHE		Hato La Esperanza Aerodrome	Puerto Gaitán	04°14′15″N 071°43′05″W	Closed
SKHG		Hacienda Garcia Aerodrome	Ambalema	04°51′55″N 074°48′13″W	
SKHH		Carolina Larrarte Regional High-Complexity Hospital Heliport	Pereira	04°48′04″N 075°48′56″W	
SKHI		Baru Water Aerodrome	Cartagena	10°13′55″N 075°35′16″W	
SKHJ		Honduras Aerodrome	María La Baja	09°58′20″N 075°22′27″W	Closed
SKHL		Cota Helicentre Heliport	Cota	04°44′37″N 074°08′36″W	
SKHN		Shangri-La Aerodrome	Riohacha	11°16′43″N 073°07′42″W	
SKHO		Irho Airport	San Alberto	07°44′04″N 073°26′04″W	
SKHP		San Vicente de Paul Hospital Heliport	Rionegro	06°09′11″N 075°26′05″W	
SKHR		Chaparrito Aerodrome	Paz de Ariporo	05°33′23″N 071°12′49″W	
SKHS		Caldas Hospital Heliport	Manizales	05°03′45″N 075°30′03″W	
SKHT		Hato San José Aerodrome	La Primavera	05°55′47″N 069°37′50″W	
SKHU		Santa Helena de Upia Aerodrome	Villanueva	04°20′23″N 072°44′34″W	
SKHV		Hato Viejo Aerodrome	Arauca	06°53′47″N 070°46′45″W	
SKHX		Helitaxi Heliport	Choachí	04°37′33″N 073°52′32″W	Closed
SKHY		Hato Garibay Aerodrome	Maní	04°27′56″N 072°19′34″W	
SKHZ		Virgilio Barco Vargas Aerodrome	Calamar	01°27′23″N 072°48′04″W	Closed
SKIA		La Dilia Aerodrome	Agustín Codazzi	09°53′55″N 073°25′20″W	
SKIB	IBE	Perales Airport	Ibagué	04°25′18″N 075°08′01″W	
SKIC		Las Delicias de San Luis de Palenque Aerodrome	San Luis de Palenque	05°12′27″N 071°48′49″W	Closed
SKID		ISA Heliport	Medellín	06°12′02″N 075°34′20″W	
SKIE		Miel I Heliport	Norcasia	05°34′19″N 074°52′51″W	
SKIF		Cienfuego Aerodrome	Pore	05°34′24″N 071°43′33″W	
SKIG	IGO	Jaime Ortiz Betancur Airport	Chigorodó	07°40′45″N 076°41′00″W	
SKIH		Sinai Aerodrome	Villavieja	03°19′32″N 075°11′12″W	
SKII		Ingenio Carmelita Aerodrome	Riofrío	04°04′22″N 076°18′58″W	
SKIL		Banco de la República Heliport	Girardot	04°17′58″N 074°48′39″W	Closed
SKIM	LPE	La Primavera Airport	La Primavera	05°28′39″N 070°25′17″W	
SKIN		Guinulero Aerodrome	Tumaco	01°43′40″N 078°56′25″W	Closed
SKIO		Cicuco Airport	Cicuco	09°16′08″N 074°39′08″W	
SKIP	IPI	San Luis Airport	Ipiales	00°51′43″N 077°40′19″W	
SKIQ		Pinoquia Aerodrome	Puerto Carreño	06°09′09″N 068°49′04″W	Closed
SKIR		Mapiripán Airport	Mapiripán	02°53′50″N 072°08′28″W	
SKIS		San Isidro Aerodrome II	Cumaral	04°09′31″N 073°20′27″W	
SKIT		La Pintada Aerodrome	Paz de Ariporo	05°29′26″N 071°12′11″W	
SKIV		Villa Rosa Aerodrome	Valledupar	10°12′14″N 073°33′20″W	Closed
SKIX		Irlanda Aerodrome	Páez	02°49′16″N 076°03′28″W	
SKIY		Ingenio Mayagüez Aerodrome	Candelaria	03°23′41″N 076°19′23″W	
SKIZ		El Rinconcito Aerodrome	Puerto López	03°55′39″N 073°04′53″W	Closed
SKJA		Majaguillo Aerodrome	Orocué	04°49′55″N 071°41′25″W	
SKJB		Jabalćon Aerodrome	Saldaña	03°50′32″N 075°02′01″W	Closed
SKJC		Juanchaco Airport	Buenaventura / Juanchaco	03°56′05″N 077°21′43″W	
SKJG		Mina de Carbón Jagua de Ibirico Aerodrome	La Jagua de Ibirico	09°35′25″N 073°17′19″W	
SKJI		La Jagua de Ibirico Airport	La Jagua de Ibirico	09°33′13″N 073°22′14″W	
SKJJ		Guadalupe Aerodrome	Orocué	05°00′24″N 071°42′58″W	
SKJL		La Piedra Aerodrome	Paz de Ariporo	05°53′14″N 071°19′06″W	Closed
SKJM		Jamaica Aerodrome	Aguazul	05°05′26″N 072°26′46″W	
SKJP		San José del Ariporo Aerodrome	Paz de Ariporo	06°02′52″N 070°00′45″W	
SKJR		Jaguar Aerodrome	Puerto Gaitán	04°12′59″N 072°01′40″W	
SKJS		Los Monjes Aerodrome	San Martín	07°59′34″N 073°40′31″W	Closed
SKJU	JUO	Juradó Airport	Juradó	07°04′25″N 077°43′45″W	
SKJV		San Javier Aerodrome	Piedras	04°23′59″N 075°00′55″W	
SKJX		Jagueyes Aerodrome	San Luis de Palenque	05°12′55″N 071°58′41″W	
SKJZ		San Jacinto de Apartadó Aerodrome	Apartadó	07°54′25″N 076°39′07″W	
SKKA		La Bohemia Aerodrome	Orocué	05°06′38″N 071°41′53″W	
SKKC		El Cielo Aerodrome	Paz de Ariporo	06°06′11″N 070°44′52″W	Closed
SKKG		El Guayabeto Aerodrome	Puerto Gaitán	04°24′03″N 071°25′39″W	
SKKM		Cumare Aerodrome	San Martín	03°37′23″N 072°33′42″W	
SKKP		Los Alpes Aerodrome	Concordia	05°57′32″N 075°50′58″W	Closed
SKLA		Jerónimo de Aguayo Airport	Málaga	06°42′21″N 072°43′49″W	
SKLB		El Borrego Airport	El Borrego	09°35′06″N 073°27′07″W	
SKLC	APO	Antonio Roldán Betancourt Airport	Apartadó	07°48′42″N 076°42′59″W	
SKLD		El Edén Airport	Santa Ana	09°31′15″N 074°20′34″W	
SKLE		La Culebra Aerodrome	Orocué	04°54′31″N 071°38′04″W	Closed
SKLF		La Flora Aerodrome	San Luis de Palenque	05°12′35″N 071°48′39″W	
SKLG	LQM	Caucayá Airport	Puerto Leguízamo	00°10′56″S 074°46′15″W	
SKLH		Llano Caucho Aerodrome	Cumaribo	04°26′08″N 070°41′43″W	
SKLI		La Isla Aerodrome	Puerto Gaitán	04°25′16″N 071°37′38″W	
SKLJ		Lajitas Airport	Puerto López	04°09′23″N 072°54′27″W	
SKLK		Los Kioskos Aerodrome	Puerto Gaitán	03°28′29″N 072°14′06″W	
SKLL		Puerto Lleras Airport	Puerto Lleras	03°17′23″N 073°22′45″W	
SKLM	MCJ	La Mina Airport	Maicao	11°13′57″N 072°29′21″W	
SKLN		Los Mangos Aerodrome	Saldaña	03°54′57″N 074°58′55″W	Closed; Also SQGT
SKLO		La Bramadora Aerodrome	San Luis de Palenque	05°11′29″N 071°44′38″W	
SKLP	LPD	La Pedrera Airport	La Pedrera	01°19′29″S 069°34′53″W	
SKLQ		Las Camelias Aerodrome	San Luis de Palenque	05°02′11″N 071°11′53″W	
SKLR		Fuerte Militar Larandia	Larandia	01°28′38″N 075°29′12″W	
SKLS		Los Toros Airport	Trinidad	05°25′39″N 071°12′59″W	
SKLT	LET	Alfredo Vásquez Cobo International Airport	Leticia	04°11′31″S 069°56′32″W	
SKLU		La Unión Aerodrome	Paz de Ariporo	05°37′42″N 070°42′11″W	
SKLV		La Vega Aerodrome	Zambrano	09°51′19″N 074°53′30″W	
SKLW		La Potra Aerodrome	Puerto Rondón	06°31′17″N 071°03′09″W	Closed
SKLX		La Candelaria de Orocué Aerodrome	Orocué	05°06′29″N 071°37′27″W	
SKLY		La Macoya Aerodrome	Yopal	05°13′34″N 072°08′52″W	
SKLZ		Colineras Aerodrome	Paz de Ariporo	06°04′17″N 070°22′04″W	
SKMA		Major Justino Mariño Cuesto Air Base	Madrid	04°43′40″N 074°16′31″W	
SKMB	TBD	Timbiqui Airport	Timbiquí	02°46′39″N 077°40′03″W	
SKMC		San Carlos de Maní Aerodrome	Maní	05°00′37″N 072°19′25″W	
SKMD	EOH	Olaya Herrera Airport	Medellín	06°13′14″N 075°35′26″W	
SKME		Lieutenant Colonel Luis F. Pinto Parra Air Base	Melgar	04°12′59″N 074°38′06″W	
SKMF	MFS	Miraflores Airport	Miraflores	01°20′15″N 071°57′02″W	
SKMG	MGN	Baracoa Airport	Magangué	09°17′06″N 074°50′47″W	
SKMH		Campo Alegre Aerodrome	Pana Pana	01°51′55″N 069°00′36″W	
SKMI		Getsemani Aerodrome	Hato Corozal	06°09′02″N 070°01′46″W	Closed
SKMJ		Maicao Airport	Maicao	11°23′24″N 072°14′20″W	
SKMK		La Mata Aerodrome	Arauca	07°01′12″N 070°44′21″W	Closed
SKML	MTB	Montelíbano Airport	Montelíbano	07°58′18″N 075°25′57″W	
SKMM		El Carmen de Guamal Aerodrome	Guamal	09°10′13″N 074°12′43″W	Closed
SKMN		Maní Aerodrome	Maní	04°50′00″N 072°16′00″W	Coordinates unverified
SKMO	MSK	Morelía Airport	Puerto Gaitan	03°45′01″N 071°27′22″W	
SKMP	MMP	San Bernardo Airport	Santa Cruz de Mompox	09°15′30″N 074°26′18″W	
SKMQ		San José de Mulatos Aerodrome	San Pedro de Urabá	08°21′00″N 076°20′00″W	Coordinates unverified
SKMR	MTR	Los Garzones Airport	Montería	08°49′22″N 075°49′31″W	
SKMS		La Mesa Aerodrome	La Victoria	04°33′50″N 076°01′26″W	
SKMT		Matupa Aerodrome	San Martín	03°35′43″N 073°24′13″W	Closed
SKMU	MVP	Fabio Alberto León Bentley Airport	Mitú	01°15′13″N 070°14′03″W	
SKMV		Matenovillos Aerodrome	San Luis de Palenque	05°12′37″N 071°51′03″W	
SKMW		Manuelita Aerodrome	Yopal	05°04′27″N 072°01′53″W	Closed
SKMX		Maximena Aerodrome	Maní	04°28′20″N 072°06′34″W	
SKMY		Mayorca Aerodrome	Ariguaní	09°55′22″N 074°05′42″W	Closed
SKMZ	MZL	La Nubia Airport	Manizales	05°01′48″N 075°27′56″W	
SKNA	LMC	La Macarena Airport	La Macarena	02°10′33″N 073°47′12″W	
SKNB		Banco de la República Heliport	Barbacoas	01°40′20″N 078°08′32″W	Closed
SKNC	NCI	Antioquia Airport	Necoclí	08°27′12″N 076°46′43″W	
SKND		San Fernando Aerodrome	Paz de Ariporo	05°39′48″N 071°41′53″W	
SKNE		Sabaneta de San Martín Airport	San Martín	08°01′37″N 073°31′00″W	
SKNF		Monfort Aerodrome	Yavaraté	00°37′30″N 069°44′58″W	
SKNG		San Gerardo del Cerrito Aerodrome	El Cerrito	03°44′31″N 076°23′25″W	
SKNH		La Manga Aerodrome	Aipe	03°14′49″N 075°14′46″W	Closed
SKNI		San Luis de Fuente de Oro Aerodrome	Fuente de Oro	03°30′00″N 073°39′56″W	
SKNJ		San Juan del Cesar Airport	San Juan del Cesar	10°44′31″N 072°59′28″W	
SKNK		Nueva Unión Aerodrome	Pijiño	09°39′11″N 073°55′22″W	
SKNL		El Naranjal Aerodrome	Barrancabermeja	07°06′38″N 073°47′14″W	
SKNM		San Juan Aerodrome	Maní	04°50′39″N 072°18′02″W	
SKNN		Cananari Aerodrome	Mitú	00°32′42″N 070°55′43″W	
SKNO		Canta Claro Aerodrome	Orocué	04°57′08″N 071°58′20″W	
SKNP	SQE	San Luis de Palenque Airport	San Luis de Palenque	05°25′03″N 071°43′51″W	
SKNQ	NQU	Reyes Murillo Airport	Nuquí	05°42′37″N 077°15′43″W	
SKNR		Guanaguanare Aerodrome	La Primavera	05°06′26″N 069°54′06″W	
SKNS		Cantadelicias Aerodrome	Alpujarra	03°23′14″N 074°56′02″W	
SKNT		El Encanto Aerodrome	Cumaribo	04°41′37″N 070°54′28″W	
SKNU		San Luis de Palermo	Palermo	02°55′47″N 075°25′12″W	
SKNV	NVA	Benito Salas	Neiva	02°57′01″N 075°17′38″W	
SKNW		Nueva Cheka Aerodrome	Zona Bananera	10°39′54″N 074°11′46″W	
SKNX		Lomas del Viento Aerodrome	Cali	03°18′24″N 076°33′45″W	
SKNY	MOY	Monterrey de Casanare Aerodrome	Monterrey	04°53′00″N 072°54′00″W	Coordinates unverified
SKNZ		La Esperanza de Puerto Salgar Aerodrome	Puerto Salgar	05°45′22″N 074°30′47″W	Closed
SKOA		La Mapora Aerodrome	Pore	05°38′45″N 071°59′19″W	
SKOB		Morocotas Aerodrome	Orocué	04°53′28″N 071°11′29″W	
SKOC	OCV	Aguas Claras Airport	Ocaña	08°18′56″N 073°21′30″W	
SKOE	ORC	Orocue Airport	Orocué	04°47′25″N 071°20′54″W	
SKOH		Shaio Clinic Heliport	Bogotá	04°42′03″N 074°04′03″W	Closed
SKOL		La Olga Heliport	Dibulla	11°13′36″N 073°20′18″W	
SKOM		La Monica Aerodrome	Tauramena	04°40′57″N 072°35′50″W	
SKON		El Convento Aerodrome	Villavicencio	04°01′24″N 073°21′10″W	
SKOO		El Condor Aerodrome	Flandes	04°15′34″N 074°49′51″W	
SKOP		Cotoprix Aerodrome	Riohacha	11°13′25″N 072°50′10″W	Closed
SKOR		Orito Airport	Orito	00°39′59″N 076°52′36″W	
SKOS		Soceagro Aerodrome	Villanueva	04°29′32″N 072°50′26″W	
SKOT	OTU	Otú Airport	Remedios	07°00′38″N 074°42′56″W	
SKOV		Providencia Aerodrome	Tauramena	04°58′17″N 072°35′59″W	
SKOW		Polonia Aerodrome	Villavieja	03°16′00″N 075°10′05″W	Closed
SKOY		El Cebruno Aerodrome	Ayapel	08°19′45″N 075°07′56″W	Closed
SKOZ		El Corozo Aerodrome	Arauca	06°54′09″N 070°51′22″W	Closed
SKPA	RON	Juan José Rondón Airport	Paipa	05°45′52″N 073°06′21″W	
SKPB		Puerto Bolívar Airport	La Guajira Department	12°13′18″N 071°59′03″W	
SKPC	PCR	Puerto Carreño Airport	Puerto Carreño	06°11′06″N 067°29′33″W	
SKPD	PDA	Obando Airport	Puerto Inírida	03°51′06″N 067°54′18″W	
SKPE	PEI	Matecaña International Airport	Pereira	04°48′46″N 075°44′22″W	
SKPF		Paola Aerodrome	Restrepo	04°10′05″N 073°30′57″W	
SKPG		Puerto Gaitán Airport	Puerto Gaitán	04°18′11″N 072°05′08″W	
SKPH		Apotema Heliport	Bogotá	04°41′35″N 074°02′02″W	
SKPI	PTX	Contador Airport	Pitalito	01°51′26″N 076°05′08″W	
SKPJ		Puerto Estrella Aerodrome	Uribia	12°21′00″N 071°18′00″W	Coordinates unverified
SKPK		El Pailón Heliport	Candelaria	03°24′38″N 076°21′02″W	Closed
SKPL	PLT	Plato Airport	Plato	09°48′04″N 074°47′11″W	
SKPM		La Pamela Aerodrome	Santa Rosalía	04°54′08″N 070°22′33″W	
SKPN	NAR	Puerto Nare Airport	Puerto Nare	06°12′36″N 074°35′27″W	
SKPO		La Concepción Aerodrome	Ayapel	08°06′37″N 075°00′40″W	
SKPP	PPN	Guillermo León Valencia Airport	Popayán	02°27′16″N 076°36′35″W	
SKPQ	PAL	Captain Germán Olano Moreno Air Base	Palanquero	05°29′00″N 074°39′27″W	
SKPR	PBE	Morela Airport	Puerto Berrío	06°27′36″N 074°24′38″W	
SKPS	PSO	Antonio Nariño Airport	Pasto	01°23′47″N 077°17′28″W	
SKPT		Sopetrán Aerodrome	Sopetrán	06°29′53″N 075°47′07″W	Closed
SKPU		Punta Piedra Aerodrome	Puerto Parra	06°47′14″N 074°02′51″W	
SKPV	PVA	El Embrujo Airport	Providencia Island	13°21′26″N 081°21′29″W	
SKPX		Planadas Airport	Planadas	03°11′50″N 075°38′31″W	
SKPY		Primero de Mayo Aerodrome	Paratebueno	04°20′05″N 073°08′38″W	
SKPZ	PZA	Paz de Ariporo Airport	Paz de Ariporo	05°52′34″N 071°53′18″W	
SKQA		Las Guamas Aerodrome	Paz de Ariporo	05°55′38″N 071°02′15″W	
SKQE		Maria Isabel Aerodrome	Nunchía	05°24′30″N 071°52′10″W	
SKQI		Tarqui Aerodrome	Tauramena	04°45′26″N 072°41′53″W	
SKQJ		Puerto Alvira Caño Jabon Aerodrome	Mapiripán	02°54′10″N 071°44′59″W	
SKQL		Aracal Aerodrome	Hato Corozal	06°10′16″N 071°33′12″W	
SKQM		Morichito Aerodrome II	Maní	04°43′35″N 072°32′14″W	
SKQP		La Roca Heliport	Quípama	05°31′52″N 074°09′21″W	
SKQR		San Vicente de Chucuri Airport	San Vicente de Chucuri	06°53′28″N 073°25′46″W	
SKQS		Silvana Aerodrome	Cumaribo	04°57′41″N 069°13′54″W	
SKQU	MQU	Mariquita Airport	Mariquita	05°12′45″N 074°53′01″W	
SKQV		Bosques de la Primavera Aerodrome	La Primavera	05°21′01″N 069°44′48″W	
SKQW		Puerto Rico de Caquetá Aerodrome	Puerto Rico	01°52′30″N 075°09′20″W	Closed
SKRA	TCD	Tarapacá Airport	Tarapacá, Amazonas	02°53′45″S 069°44′59″W	
SKRB		La Aurora Aerodrome	Paratebueno	04°19′11″N 073°16′22″W	
SKRC		Represa de las Canarias Aerodrome	Paz de Ariporo	05°45′57″N 071°15′01″W	
SKRD		Puerto Rondón Airport	Puerto Rondón	06°17′02″N 071°05′57″W	
SKRE		Rancho Alegre Aerodrome	La Primavera	05°19′22″N 069°57′02″W	Closed
SKRF		Santa Rita Airport	Mitú	01°39′10″N 070°24′35″W	
SKRG	MDE	José María Córdova International Airport	Medellín/Rionegro	06°09′52″N 075°25′23″W	
SKRH	RCH	Almirante Padilla Airport	Riohacha	11°31′34″N 072°55′36″W	
SKRI		Carolina del Principe Aerodrome	Carolina del Principe	06°43′29″N 075°17′27″W	
SKRJ		Manaure Aerodrome	Manaure	11°47′14″N 072°25′00″W	
SKRK		San Carlos del Planas Aerodrome	Cumaribo	04°02′00″N 070°50′00″W	Coordinates unverified
SKRL		La Irlanda Aerodrome	El Paso	09°37′11″N 073°37′51″W	
SKRM		Villa Georgina Aerodrome	Pasca	04°21′45″N 074°19′17″W	Closed
SKRN		Rancho Nare Aerodrome	Puerto López	03°51′15″N 072°58′25″W	Closed
SKRO		Corocora Airport	Corocora	05°22′29″N 070°58′41″W	
SKRQ		Santa Rita de Ituango Aerodrome	Ituango	07°20′05″N 075°36′49″W	
SKRR		Los Morros Aerodrome	San Onofre	09°42′58″N 075°39′02″W	
SKRS		San Rafael de San Pablo Aerodrome	San Pablo	07°31′50″N 073°56′10″W	
SKRT		Palmar de Oriente Aerodrome	Villanueva	04°29′33″N 072°50′27″W	
SKRU	SNT	Las Cruces Airport	Sabana de Torres	07°23′00″N 073°30′20″W	
SKRV		Matabrava Aerodrome	San Luis de Palenque	05°12′47″N 071°41′30″W	
SKRW		La Rubiera Aerodrome	Arauca	06°46′23″N 070°01′08″W	Closed
SKRY		EL Carpintero Aerodrome	Cabuyaro	04°16′00″N 072°55′54″W	Closed
SKRZ		La Esperanza de Barbosa Aerodrome	Barbosa	05°56′52″N 073°36′34″W	
SKSA	RVE	Los Colonizadores Airport	Saravena	06°57′01″N 071°51′22″W	
SKSB		Santa Bárbara Airport	Cumaral	04°13′59″N 073°15′08″W	
SKSC		La Cabaña de San Carlos de Guaroa Aerodrome	San Carlos de Guaroa	03°57′20″N 073°21′41″W	
SKSD		Sardinas Airport	Orocué	04°59′09″N 071°30′20″W	
SKSE		San Esteban Aerodrome	Paz de Ariporo	05°26′39″N 070°50′07″W	
SKSF		Santa Fe de Antioquia Airport	Santa Fe de Antioquia	06°30′05″N 075°49′22″W	Closed
SKSG		Los Pozos Airport	San Gil	06°35′27″N 073°07′44″W	
SKSH		Seatech Heliport	Cartagena	10°20′29″N 075°30′06″W	
SKSI		Santiago Aerodrome 1	Maní	04°43′50″N 072°19′17″W	
SKSJ	SJE	Jorge Enrique González Torres Airport	San José del Guaviare	02°34′47″N 072°38′21″W	
SKSK		District Health Centre Heliport	Bogotá	04°37′08″N 074°05′53″W	Also SKDC; closed
SKSL	SSL	Santa Rosalía Airport	Santa Rosalía	05°07′51″N 070°52′06″W	
SKSM	SMR	Simón Bolívar International Airport	Santa Marta	11°07′11″N 074°13′50″W	
SKSN		San Pablo de Bugalagrande Aerodrome	Bugalagrande	04°12′06″N 076°01′02″W	Closed
SKSO	SOX	Alberto Lleras Camargo Airport	Sogamoso	05°40′35″N 072°58′11″W	
SKSP	ADZ	Gustavo Rojas Pinilla International Airport (Sesquicentenario Airport)	San Andrés	12°35′01″N 081°42′41″W	
SKSQ		Mosquera Aerodrome	Mosquera	02°30′00″N 078°25′00″W	Coordinates unverified
SKSR	SRS	San Marcos Airport	San Marcos	08°41′25″N 075°09′35″W	Also SQGX
SKSS		Las Delicias de Cumaral Aerodrome	Cumaral	04°11′47″N 073°04′23″W	
SKST		Millan Vargas Aerodrome	Simití	07°55′44″N 073°58′02″W	
SKSU		San Felipe del Paulo Aerodrome	Trinidad	05°12′11″N 070°53′43″W	
SKSV	SVI	Eduardo Falla Solano Airport	San Vicente del Caguán	02°09′07″N 074°45′58″W	
SKSW		Santa Lucia de Ábrego Aerodrome	Ábrego	08°04′00″N 073°12′00″W	Coordinates unverified
SKSX		San Rafael de Guanapalo Aerodrome	San Luis de Palenque	05°22′23″N 071°48′14″W	Closed
SKSY		San Sebastian Aerodrome	Cabuyaro	04°19′57″N 072°46′30″W	
SKSZ		Palmasola Aerodrome	Puerto López	04°07′38″N 073°04′36″W	Closed
SKTA		El Rodeo Aerodrome	Tauramena	04°34′27″N 072°41′35″W	
SKTB	TIB	Tibú Airport	Tibú	08°37′51″N 072°43′51″W	
SKTC		Mirador Aerodrome	Trinidad	05°25′58″N 071°36′04″W	
SKTD	TDA	Trinidad Airport	Trinidad	05°25′50″N 071°39′30″W	
SKTE		Tiquie Airport	Tiquié	00°14′00″N 070°10′10″W	
SKTF		Tierra Firme Heliport	Bogotá	04°41′35″N 074°02′05″W	
SKTG		El Triangulo Aerodrome	Algarrobo	10°19′05″N 074°01′31″W	
SKTH		Los Mulatos Aerodrome	La Tola	02°39′00″N 078°18′00″W	Coordinates unverified
SKTI		Tolemaida Air Base	Nilo, Cundinamarca	04°14′41″N 074°39′00″W	
SKTJ	TNJ	Gustavo Rojas Pinilla International Airport	Tunja	05°32′32″N 073°20′39″W	
SKTK		Altamira Airport	Orocué	04°45′32″N 071°38′17″W	
SKTL	TLU	Golfo de Morrosquillo Airport	Tolú	09°30′34″N 075°35′09″W	
SKTM	TME	Gabriel Vargas Santos Airport	Tame	06°27′04″N 071°45′36″W	
SKTN		La Trinidad de Cumaribo Aerodrome	Cumaribo	02°58′00″N 070°42′11″W	Closed
SKTO		Montelibano Aerodrome	Agustín Codazzi	09°53′11″N 073°14′33″W	Closed
SKTP		Tapurucuara Airport	Tapurucuara	01°28′18″N 070°09′47″W	
SKTQ	TQS	Captain Ernesto Esguerra Cubides Air Base	Tres Esquinas	00°44′45″N 075°14′03″W	
SKTR		Taraira Airport	Taraira	00°34′04″N 069°38′17″W	
SKTS		Tesalia Aerodrome	Gigante	02°27′23″N 075°27′01″W	Closed
SKTT		El Portal Aerodrome	San Alberto	07°45′01″N 073°24′20″W	
SKTU	TRB	Gonzalo Mejía Airport	Turbo	08°04′28″N 076°44′28″W	
SKTV		San Carlos de Tuluá Aerodrome	Tuluá	04°03′32″N 076°16′13″W	
SKTX		Tijereta Aerodrome	Piedecuesta	06°55′19″N 073°02′20″W	
SKTZ		Tobasia Aerodrome	Puerto López	04°04′43″N 073°04′46″W	
SKUA	MQZ	Colonel Luis Arturo Rodríguez Meneses Air Base	Marandúa	05°31′35″N 068°40′55″W	
SKUB	URI	Uribe Airport	La Uribe	03°14′13″N 074°20′47″W	
SKUC	AUC	Santiago Pérez Quiroz Airport	Arauca	07°04′09″N 070°44′13″W	
SKUD		Comuneros Aerodrome	Palmas del Socorro	06°23′45″N 073°15′26″W	Closed
SKUG		La Fuga Aerodrome	Puerto López	04°03′23″N 072°14′53″W	
SKUH		Guamitos de Palermo Aerodrome	Palermo	02°55′03″N 075°23′59″W	
SKUI	UIB	El Caraño Airport	Quibdó	05°41′27″N 076°38′28″W	
SKUJ		Udelva Aerodrome	Jamundí	03°14′08″N 076°30′17″W	
SKUL	ULQ	Farfan Airport	Tuluá	04°05′40″N 076°13′26″W	
SKUM		Cumaribo Airport	Cumaribo	04°26′47″N 069°46′53″W	
SKUQ		Murindó Airport	Murindó	06°58′34″N 076°48′45″W	
SKUR	URR	Urrao Airport	Urrao	06°19′35″N 076°08′25″W	
SKUS		San Agustin Aerodrome	Saldaña	03°56′42″N 074°56′14″W	
SKUT		Muletos Aerodrome	Maní	04°33′18″N 072°10′31″W	Closed
SKUU		Curumani Aerodrome	Curumaní	09°13′20″N 073°34′20″W	
SKUV		Guerima Aerodrome	Cumaribo	03°37′48″N 070°19′23″W	
SKUW		Puerto Rico de Meta Airport	Puerto Rico	02°56′23″N 073°11′56″W	
SKUY		Ciudad Yari Aerodrome	San Vicente del Caguán	01°35′00″N 073°52′00″W	Coordinates unverified
SKUZ		Muzo Airport	Muzo	05°32′48″N 074°06′45″W	
SKVA		La Gaviota Aerodrome	Nueva Granada	09°38′40″N 074°25′30″W	Closed
SKVB		Jabiru Aerodrome	Armero	05°05′05″N 074°51′23″W	Closed
SKVC		Volar Colombia Aerodrome	La Pintada	05°46′25″N 075°36′11″W	Closed
SKVD		Los Venados de la Primavera Aerodrome	La Primavera	05°40′17″N 070°00′01″W	Closed
SKVE		Villa Andrea Aerodrome	Maní	04°47′34″N 072°14′04″W	Closed
SKVF		Vigía del Fuerte Airport	Vigía del Fuerte	06°34′05″N 076°53′16″W	
SKVG	VGZ	Villa Garzón Airport	Villagarzón	00°58′43″N 076°36′20″W	
SKVH		Vista Hermosa Aerodrome	Vista Hermosa	03°08′07″N 073°45′29″W	
SKVI		El Viso Aerodrome	Campoalegre	02°43′53″N 075°19′17″W	
SKVJ		Pivijay Aerodrome	La Primavera	05°07′49″N 069°58′06″W	
SKVK		Pensilvania Aerodrome	Pensilvania	05°22′11″N 075°08′27″W	Closed
SKVL	PYA	Velasquez Airport	Puerto Boyacá	05°56′19″N 074°27′25″W	
SKVM		Venecia de Guamas Aerodrome	Paz de Ariporo	05°41′18″N 070°44′16″W	
SKVN		Villanueva Airport	Villanueva, Casanare	04°38′14″N 072°56′59″W	
SKVO		El Vaticano Aerodrome	Paratebueno	04°17′50″N 073°11′55″W	
SKVP	VUP	Alfonso López Pumarejo Airport	Valledupar	10°26′06″N 073°14′58″W	
SKVQ		Ventaquemada Aerodrome	Alvarado	04°31′05″N 074°58′21″W	
SKVR		Nueva Roma Aerodrome	Sabanas de San Ángel	09°58′05″N 074°19′49″W	
SKVS		La Venturosa Aerodrome	Puerto Carreño	06°08′21″N 068°46′41″W	
SKVT		Las Violetas Aerodrome	Castilla la Nueva	03°51′52″N 073°43′23″W	
SKVU		Varsovia Aerodrome	San Luis	04°00′56″N 075°08′48″W	
SKVV	VVC	La Vanguardia Airport	Villavicencio	04°10′06″N 073°36′53″W	
SKVW		Vegas del Rio Aerodrome	Supía	05°26′30″N 075°39′00″W	Closed
SKVY		Sevillano Aerodrome	Ciénaga	10°58′49″N 074°14′04″W	
SKVZ		Campo Capote Aerodrome	Puerto Parra	06°45′00″N 073°55′00″W	Coordinates unverified
SKWA		Wacaricuara Aerodrome	Mitú	01°41′26″N 070°14′18″W	Closed
SKWE		Eltrebol Aerodrome	Guatapé	06°13′37″N 075°11′13″W	Closed
SKWI		Maria Isabella Aerodrome	Paz de Ariporo	05°45′17″N 071°38′05″W	
SKWM		El Palmar Aerodrome 2	Nunchía	05°23′23″N 071°57′33″W	
SKWN		Wainambi Aerodrome	Yavaraté	00°52′00″N 069°37′02″W	
SKWO		Las Vegas de Unguía Airport	Unguía	08°01′59″N 077°05′31″W	
SKWP		Los Indios Aerodrome	San Luis de Palenque	05°12′49″N 071°53′06″W	
SKWS		Wasay Aerodrome	Mitú	01°39′39″N 070°01′10″W	
SKWV		Bellavista Aerodrome	Cumaribo	04°45′48″N 070°12′14″W	
SKWW		Mataguaro Aerodrome	Puerto Carreño	05°54′20″N 068°18′51″W	
SKXA		La Victoria Aerodrome	Paz de Ariporo	05°44′29″N 071°32′38″W	
SKXE		Xielo Aerodrome	Ricaurte	04°21′49″N 074°44′16″W	
SKXF		La Fahena Aerodrome	Paz de Ariporo	05°40′44″N 071°26′18″W	
SKXM		Madrigal Aerodrome	El Cerrito	03°42′26″N 076°21′04″W	
SKXO		Agrolar Aerodrome	Maní	04°28′09″N 071°57′39″W	
SKXT		La Gaitana Aerodrome	Cabuyaro	04°13′30″N 073°01′46″W	Also SKTY
SKYA	AYG	Yaguará Airport	Yaguará	01°32′39″N 073°56′00″W	
SKYC		Cienaga Aerodrome	Yopal	05°16′08″N 072°18′35″W	
SKYG		Yapu Aerodrome	Mitú	00°37′18″N 070°21′06″W	
SKYH		Hato Los Merecures Aerodrome	La Primavera	05°57′48″N 068°54′07″W	
SKYI		Yarumitos Aerodrome	Maní, Casanare	04°43′19″N 072°20′36″W	
SKYM		Yataros de Melua Aerodrome	Puerto López	03°47′38″N 072°28′40″W	
SKYN		Magüi Payán Aerodrome	Magüí Payán	01°46′27″N 078°11′29″W	
SKYP	EYP	El Alcaraván Airport	Yopal	05°19′09″N 072°23′03″W	
SKYS		Las Tapias Aerodrome	Pelaya	08°40′41″N 073°45′56″W	
SKYV		Guacamayas Aerodrome	San Vicente del Caguán	02°17′00″N 074°57′00″W	Coordinates unverified
SKZA		La Venganza Aerodrome	Paz de Ariporo	06°01′21″N 070°53′51″W	
SKZB		La Bonanza Aerodrome	Orocué	04°58′05″N 071°52′09″W	Closed
SKZC		Papare Heliport	Ciénaga	11°03′05″N 074°13′40″W	
SKZE		La Colonia Aerodrome	Paz de Ariporo	05°45′50″N 071°31′53″W	
SKZI		López de Micay Aerodrome	López de Micay	02°57′14″N 077°11′42″W	Closed
SKZL		Liberty Plaza Heliport	Medellín	06°14′43″N 075°34′29″W	
SKZM		El Esfuerzo Aerodrome	El Piñón	10°24′43″N 074°46′50″W	Closed
SKZR		Rionegro Free Trade Zone Heliport	Rionegro	06°09′17″N 075°24′50″W	
SKZS		CTIC Clinic Heliport	Bogotá	04°44′54″N 074°02′10″W	
SKZT		Bizerta Airport	Nunchía	05°25′32″N 071°59′42″W	

== SL - Bolivia ==
Also see airport category and list.

ICAO	IATA	Airport name	Community	Coordinates	Notes
SLAB		Abapo Airport	Abapo	18°38′04″S 062°56′12″W	Closed
SLAG	MHW	Monteagudo Airport	Monteagudo	19°49′25″S 063°57′45″W	
SLAL	SRE	Alcantarí Airport	Sucre	19°14′49″S 065°08′59″W	
SLAM		Arampampa Airport	Arampampa	17°52′50″S 066°06′05″W	
SLAN		Angora Airport	Angora	14°25′42″S 065°47′30″W	
SLAP	APB	Apolo Airport	Apolo	14°44′10″S 068°24′40″W	
SLAQ		Aiquile Airport	Aiquile	18°12′55″S 065°11′15″W	
SLAS	ASC	Ascensión de Guarayos Airport	Ascensión de Guarayos	15°55′55″S 063°09′22″W	
SLBA	BVL	Baures Airport	Baures	13°39′27″S 063°42′10″W	Formerly SLBU
SLBB		Bulo Bulo Airport	Bulo Bulo	17°15′20″S 064°22′10″W	
SLBF		Blanca Flor Airport	Blanca Flor	11°43′35″S 066°55′35″W	
SLBH		Buena Hora Airport	Buena Hora	13°04′20″S 066°33′35″W	
SLBJ	BJO	Bermejo Airport	Bermejo	22°46′25″S 064°18′46″W	
SLBN		Bella Unión Airport	Santa Ana del Yacuma	13°37′35″S 065°16′25″W	Not to be confused with BUV in Bella Unión, Uruguay
SLBR		Buen Retiro Airport	Buen Retiro	13°26′40″S 063°30′10″W	
SLBT		Buen Retiro Ballivian Airport	Buen Retiro Ballivian	13°54′45″S 066°33′45″W	
SLBV		Villa Vista Airport	Villa Vista de Montaño	13°52′00″S 066°19′55″W	
SLBY		Boyuibe Airport	Boyuibe	20°26′00″S 063°17′00″W	Coordinates unverified
SLCA	CAM	Camiri Airport	Camiri	20°00′25″S 063°31′40″W	
SLCB	CBB	Jorge Wilstermann International Airport	Cochabamba	17°25′15″S 066°10′37″W	
SLCC		Copacabana Airport	Copacabana	16°11′25″S 069°05′40″W	
SLCD		Cañada Airport	Estación San Antonio de Parapeti	20°01′40″S 063°05′20″W	
SLCE		Cabezas Airport	Cabezas	18°47′50″S 063°18′06″W	
SLCG		Charagua Airport	Charagua	19°47′05″S 063°11′20″W	
SLCH		Chimoré Airport	Chimoré	16°59′20″S 065°08′30″W	
SLCI		Caigua Airport	El Cielo	21°08′10″S 063°45′10″W	
SLCL		Challapata Airport	Challapata	18°53′00″S 066°47′45″W	
SLCM		Camiare Airport	Camiare	14°04′50″S 065°39′30″W	
SLCN		Charaña Airport	Charaña	17°35′40″S 069°26′00″W	
SLCO	CIJ	Captain Aníbal Arab Airport	Cobija	11°02′25″S 068°47′00″W	
SLCP	CEP	Concepción Airport	Concepción	16°08′35″S 062°01′35″W	
SLCR		Comarapa Airport	Comarapa	17°54′49″S 064°31′05″W	
SLCS		Cerdas Airport	Cerdas	20°48′30″S 066°24′05″W	
SLCT		Choreti Airport	Choreti	13°30′35″S 064°58′00″W	
SLCU		Culpina Airport	Culpina	20°52′00″S 064°57′30″W	
SLCV		Cavinas Airport	Puerto Cavinas	12°33′00″S 066°54′45″W	
SLDA		Caranda Airport	Caranda	17°30′50″S 063°32′10″W	
SLDE		Laguna Verde Airport	Laguna Verde	20°50′00″S 067°47′00″W	Formerly SLLG; coordinates unverified
SLDN		El Desengaño Airport	El Desengaño	14°16′25″S 065°26′25″W	
SLEA		El Cocal Airport	El Cocal	13°34′10″S 066°04′20″W	
SLEC		El Cairo Airport	El Cairo	13°47′25″S 066°19′15″W	
SLED		El Dorado Airport	El Dorado	13°04′13″S 067°09′50″W	
SLEE		El Escondido Airport	El Escondido	21°27′52″S 063°21′09″W	Closed
SLEF		El Triunfo Airport	El Triunfo	13°51′12″S 065°48′15″W	
SLEH		El Rancho Airport	El Rancho	13°08′15″S 065°07′59″W	
SLEI		Espino Airport	San Isidro del Espino	19°17′52″S 063°12′33″W	Closed
SLEK		El Condor Airport	El Condor	21°41′57″S 063°27′26″W	Closed
SLEO		El Paraíso Airport	El Paraíso	14°24′15″S 065°52′47″W	
SLEP		El Peru del Apere Airport	El Peru del Apere	14°36′20″S 065°38′05″W	
SLES		Espiritu Airport	Espiritu	13°48′20″S 066°12′15″W	
SLET	SRZ	El Trompillo Airport	Santa Cruz	17°48′41″S 063°10′17″W	
SLEV		El Salvador Airport	El Salvador	14°29′52″S 066°45′45″W	
SLEZ		La Esperanza Airport	La Esperanza	14°25′00″S 065°31′05″W	
SLFA		Fatima Airport	Fatima	15°27′10″S 066°44′44″W	
SLFL		Florida Airport	Moira	14°36′25″S 061°11′55″W	
SLFO		Flor de Oro Airport	Flor de Oro	13°33′17″S 061°00′15″W	
SLFR		Florencia Airport	Florencia	15°41′12″S 065°31′50″W	
SLGF		Gulf Airport	Basilio	18°02′20″S 063°11′55″W	
SLGM	GYA	Guayaramerín Airport	Guayaramerín	10°53′20″S 065°22′50″W	
SLGN		San Ignacito Airport	San Ignacito	15°18′00″S 065°38′00″W	Coordinates unverified
SLGP		Guirapembi Airport	Guirapembi	18°05′20″S 063°12′30″W	Closed
SLHA		Cachascani Airport	Cachascani	13°31′35″S 064°14′05″W	
SLHB		La Habana Airport	La Habana	14°15′45″S 064°52′20″W	
SLHC		Huacareta Airport	Huacareta	20°23′30″S 064°00′57″W	
SLHJ	BVK	Huacaraje Airport	Huacaraje	13°36′20″S 063°52′46″W	
SLHS		Chacobos Airport	Parapeti	19°35′59″S 062°33′48″W	Closed
SLIG		Inglaterra Airport	Inglaterra	13°26′40″S 066°30′15″W	
SLIN		Santa Catalina Airport	Santa Catalina	13°06′00″S 067°15′48″W	
SLIP		Samaipata Airport	Samaipata	18°11′35″S 063°52′40″W	
SLIR		Irobi Airport	Bella Vista	13°16′10″S 063°41′30″W	
SLIT		Itaguazurenda Airport	Itaguazurenda	19°47′00″S 063°05′10″W	
SLIX		Ixiamas Airport	Ixiamas	13°45′55″S 068°08′12″W	
SLIY		Intiraymi Airport	La Joya	17°47′45″S 067°26′05″W	
SLIZ		Izozog Airport	Izozog	18°40′15″S 063°00′07″W	
SLJA		Jatata Airport	Jatata	11°46′17″S 067°15′30″W	
SLJE	SJS	San José de Chiquitos Airport	San José de Chiquitos	17°49′55″S 060°44′35″W	
SLJN		San Juan Airport	San Juan	14°09′47″S 064°45′32″W	
SLJO	SJB	San Joaquín Airport	San Joaquín	13°04′00″S 064°40′30″W	
SLJS		Josuani Airport	Josuani	13°06′20″S 066°10′28″W	
SLJT		Santa Juanita Airport	Santa Juanita	15°55′00″S 065°15′00″W	Coordinates unverified
SLJV	SJV	San Javier Airport	San Javier	16°16′00″S 062°28′14″W	
SLKH		Puerto Heath Airport	Puerto Heath	12°30′15″S 068°39′00″W	
SLHQ		San Miguel South Airport	San Miguel de Velasco	16°42′25″S 060°58′19″W	
SLLB		Las Brizas Airport	Las Brizas	14°33′30″S 065°43′52″W	
SLLC		Laguna Colorada Airport	Laguna Colorada	22°16′20″S 067°46′10″W	
SLLH		Lago Huachi Airport	Lago Huachi	14°17′45″S 063°24′35″W	
SLLI		La India Airport	La India	13°34′00″S 066°50′15″W	
SLLJ		Laja Airport	Laja	16°32′00″S 068°18′00″W	Coordinates unverified
SLLL		Laguna Loa Airport	Laguna Loa	14°17′00″S 066°47′33″W	
SLLN		La Cañada Airport	La Cañada	14°24′00″S 066°48′00″W	Coordinates unverified
SLLP	LPB	El Alto International Airport	La Paz	16°30′48″S 068°11′32″W	
SLLZ		San Lorenzo Airport	San Lorenzo de Moxos	15°33′00″S 065°32′54″W	
SLMD		Madidi Airport	Madidi	13°23′00″S 068°39′00″W	Coordinates unverified
SLMG	MGD	Magdalena Airport	Magdalena	13°15′25″S 064°03′45″W	
SLMN		Manuripi Airport	Manuripi	11°46′30″S 068°25′22″W	
SLMV		Monte Verde Airport	Monte Verde	18°03′45″S 062°18′25″W	
SLMZ		Mizque Airport	Mizque	17°55′50″S 065°22′40″W	
SLNL		Cañada Larga Airport	Cañada Larga	17°38′45″S 062°28′50″W	
SLNO		Nuevo Mundo Airport	Nuevo Mundo	14°28′40″S 066°02′00″W	
SLNV		Nieve Airport	Nieve	14°00′45″S 065°47′25″W	
SLOR	ORU	Juan Mendoza Airport	Oruro	17°57′45″S 067°04′34″W	
SLPF		Piso Firme Airport	Piso Firme	13°37′35″S 061°44′22″W	
SLPG		Progreso Airport	Progreso	14°10′45″S 065°22′30″W	
SLPI		Pitai Airport	Pitai	15°48′30″S 065°37′10″W	
SLPL		Padilla Airport	Padilla	19°18′00″S 064°17′37″W	
SLPM		Palmira Airport	Palmira	13°44′15″S 066°24′35″W	
SLPN		Porvenir Velasco Airport	Porvenir	13°59′20″S 061°32′32″W	
SLPO	POI	Captain Nicolas Rojas Airport	Potosí	19°32′35″S 065°43′25″W	
SLPR	PUR	Puerto Rico Airport	Puerto Rico	11°06′25″S 067°32′50″W	
SLPS	PSZ	Puerto Suárez International Airport	Puerto Suárez	18°58′30″S 057°49′14″W	
SLPU		Puerto America Airport	Puerto America	11°45′45″S 067°57′35″W	
SLPW		El Porvenir Sur Airport	El Porvenir Sur	20°45′10″S 063°12′34″W	
SLQN		Coquinal Airport	Coquinal	13°12′05″S 066°59′15″W	
SLRA	SRD	San Ramón Airport	San Ramón	13°15′50″S 064°36′15″W	
SLRB	RBO	Roboré Airport	Roboré	18°19′40″S 059°45′55″W	
SLRE		El Remate Airport	El Remate	17°04′10″S 063°39′10″W	
SLRF		Refugio Airport	Refugio	14°45′50″S 061°01′55″W	
SLRH		Rancho Alegre Airport	Rancho Alegre	12°11′05″S 065°48′38″W	
SLRI	RIB	Riberalta Airport	Riberalta	11°00′30″S 066°04′30″W	
SLRL		Rosal Airport	Rosal	13°58′30″S 065°37′30″W	Coordinates unverified
SLRP		Rosapata Airport	Rosapata	18°38′30″S 067°33′30″W	Coordinates unverified
SLRQ	RBQ	Rurrenabaque Airport	Rurrenabaque	14°25′30″S 067°30′05″W	
SLRR		Retiro Airport	Retiro	14°29′10″S 066°18′30″W	
SLRT		Santa Rita Airport	Santa Rita	13°54′30″S 066°21′45″W	
SLRX		Rincon del Tigre Airport	Rincon del Tigre	18°12′05″S 058°10′10″W	
SLRY	REY	Reyes Airport	Reyes	14°18′20″S 067°21′14″W	
SLSA	SBL	Santa Ana del Yacuma Airport	Santa Ana del Yacuma	13°45′45″S 065°26′05″W	
SLSB	SRJ	Capitán Germán Quiroga Guardia Airport	San Borja	14°51′25″S 066°44′15″W	
SLSD		San Carlos Gutierrez Airport	El Peru del Apere	14°33′41″S 065°31′40″W	
SLSE		Santa Teresita Airport	Santa Teresita	16°17′20″S 059°29′40″W	
SLSG		San Miguel de Gaser Airport	Sipuati	13°54′35″S 066°07′40″W	
SLSH		Santa Ana de Huachi Airport	Santa Ana de Mosetenes	15°29′40″S 067°26′35″W	
SLSI	SNG	Capitán Av. Juan Cochamanidis Airport	San Ignacio de Velasco	16°23′00″S 060°57′46″W	
SLSK		Santa Rosa del Sara Airport	Santa Rosa del Sara	17°06′16″S 063°36′30″W	
SLSM	SNM	San Ignacio de Moxos Airport	San Ignacio de Moxos	14°58′00″S 065°38′00″W	
SLSN		Sanandita Airport	Sanandita	21°39′00″S 063°36′00″W	Coordinates unverified
SLSP		Sipuati Airport	Sipuati	21°04′05″S 063°06′34″W	
SLSQ		Saahaqui Airport	Santiago de Chiquitos	18°20′40″S 059°36′20″W	
SLSR	SRB	Santa Rosa Airport	Santa Rosa	14°04′20″S 066°47′15″W	
SLSS		Saipura Airport	Sasasama	19°23′45″S 063°04′20″W	
SLSU		Juana Azurduy de Padilla International Airport	Sucre	19°00′25″S 065°17′19″W	Military
SLTA		Taquipirenda Airport	Taquipirenda	20°20′20″S 063°08′25″W	
SLTB		Tiboy Airport	Tiboy	13°48′40″S 066°15′15″W	
SLTC		Tres Cruces Airport	Chiquitos	17°27′00″S 061°59′35″W	
SLTE		Teoponte Airport	Teoponte	15°29′28″S 067°49′35″W	
SLTG		Santiago Airport	Santiago	15°13′50″S 065°27′05″W	
SLTI	MQK	San Matías Airport	San Matías	16°20′15″S 058°24′05″W	
SLTJ	TJA	Capitán Oriel Lea Plaza Airport	Tarija	21°33′20″S 064°42′05″W	
SLTL		Toldos Airport	San Cristóbal	21°10′30″S 067°10′00″W	
SLTR	TDD	Teniente Jorge Henrich Arauz Airport	Trinidad	14°49′15″S 064°55′00″W	
SLTY		Tiguipa Airport	Tiguipa	21°00′20″S 063°19′39″W	
SLTZ		Tupiza Airport	Tupiza	21°20′10″S 065°36′42″W	
SLUC		Cuevo Airport	Cuevo	20°28′40″S 063°31′40″W	Closed
SLUN		Uncía Airport	Uncía	18°28′25″S 066°32′45″W	
SLUS		Urusi Airport	Urusi	14°19′25″S 066°07′40″W	
SLUU		Ulla Ulla Airport	Ulla Ulla	15°02′10″S 069°15′20″W	
SLUY	UYU	Uyuni Airport	Uyuni	20°26′35″S 066°51′15″W	
SLVA		Villa Aroma Airport	Villa Aroma	17°19′15″S 067°45′10″W	
SLVD		Covendo Airport	Covendo	15°47′15″S 066°58′18″W	
SLVE		Venecia Airport	Venecia	14°38′10″S 066°45′00″W	
SLVG	VAH	Capitán Av. Vidal Villagomez Toledo Airport	Vallegrande	18°28′45″S 064°05′58″W	
SLVI		Caranavi Airport	Caranavi	15°50′05″S 067°34′00″W	
SLVM	VLM	Lieutenant Colonel Rafael Pabón Airport	Villamontes	21°15′18″S 063°24′20″W	
SLVN		Villa Negrita Airport	Villa Negrita	13°16′55″S 065°48′10″W	
SLVR	VVI	Viru Viru International Airport	Santa Cruz	17°38′41″S 063°08′07″W	
SLVT		La Vertiente Airport	La Vertiente	21°17′00″S 063°17′42″W	
SLVU		Vuelta Grande Airport	Vuelta Grande	20°54′05″S 063°11′35″W	
SLVV		Villa Elvira Airport	Villa Elvira	13°38′40″S 064°26′25″W	
SLVZ		Villazon Airport	Villazon	22°03′10″S 065°38′20″W	
SLYA	BYC	Yacuiba Airport	Yacuiba	21°57′40″S 063°39′07″W	
SLYG		Yabog Airport	Las Juntas	18°39′17″S 063°08′00″W	
SLYI		Yapacaní Airport	Yapacaní	17°00′35″S 064°03′35″W	
SLZB		San Pedro Salvatierra Airport	San Pedro Salvatierra	14°50′15″S 065°42′11″W	
SLZF		San Francisco Naciff Airport	Naciff	13°45′25″S 064°28′18″W	
SLZJ		San Pedro del Rio Blanco Airport	Laguna Portia	14°11′15″S 063°32′53″W	
SLZV		San Vicente Airport	San Vicente	16°16′40″S 060°05′30″W	

== SM - Suriname ==
Also see airport category and list.

ICAO	IATA	Airport name	Community	Coordinates	Notes
SMAF		Afobaka Airstrip	Afobaka	04°59′55″N 054°59′32″W	
SMAL		Alupi Airstrip	Groot Henar	05°49′10″N 056°48′56″W	
SMAM		Amatopo Airstrip	Amatopo	03°32′50″N 057°37′55″W	
SMAN		Lawa Antino Airstrip	Benzdorp	03°37′12″N 054°08′35″W	
SMBA		Baitali Airstrip	Baitali	04°59′20″N 057°26′32″W	
SMBG		Bakhuys Airstrip	Bakhuys Gebergte	04°46′45″N 056°46′05″W	
SMBN	ABN	Albina Airstrip	Albina, Marowijne District	05°30′50″N 054°03′00″W	Closed
SMBO	BTO	Botopasi Airstrip	Botopasi	04°13′07″N 055°26′46″W	
SMCA	AAJ	Cayana Airstrip	Cayana	03°53′55″N 055°34′40″W	
SMCB		Cabana Airstrip	Cabana	04°51′10″N 055°35′35″W	
SMCI		Coeroenie Airstrip	Coeroeni	03°22′15″N 057°20′45″W	
SMCO	TOT	Totness Airstrip	Totness, Coronie District	05°52′00″N 056°19′40″W	
SMCT		Lawa Cottica Airstrip	Cottica	03°51′08″N 054°13′42″W	
SMDA	DRJ	Drietabbetje Airstrip	Drietabbetje	04°06′40″N 054°40′22″W	
SMDJ	DOE	Djumu Airstrip	Djumu / Asidonhopo	04°00′25″N 055°28′50″W	
SMDK		Donderskamp Airstrip	Donderskamp	05°21′05″N 056°21′40″W	
SMDO	LDO	Laduani Airstrip	Laduani	04°22′35″N 055°24′20″W	
SMDU		Alalapadu Airstrip	Alalapadu	02°31′25″N 056°19′30″W	
SMEG		Eduard Alexander Gummels Airport	Paramaribo	05°51′24″N 055°11′35″W	
SMGA		Gakaba Airstrip	Gakaba	04°27′15″N 054°26′45″W	
SMGH		Godo Holo Airstrip	Godo Holo	04°03′28″N 054°47′10″W	
SMGR		Gross Rosebel Airstrip	Rosebel gold mine	05°05′30″N 055°14′57″W	
SMHA		Henri Alwies Airstrip	Saramacca District	05°49′55″N 055°38′15″W	
SMJA		Jarikaba Airstrip	Jarikaba, Saramacca District	05°49′35″N 055°20′15″W	
SMJK		Njoeng Jacob Kondre Airstrip	Njoeng Jacob Kondre	04°56′09″N 055°32′05″W	
SMJP	PBM	Johan Adolf Pengel International Airport (Zanderij Int'l)	Zanderij / Paramaribo	05°27′10″N 055°11′17″W	
SMKA		Kabalebo Airstrip	Kabalebo	04°24′25″N 057°13′25″W	
SMKE		Käyser Airstrip	Käyser Mountains	03°05′35″N 056°28′25″W	
SMKM		Kami Kami Airstrip	Kami Kami mining camp	04°32′57″N 054°36′10″W	
SMLA		Lawa Anapaike Airstrip	Anapaikë	03°24′40″N 054°01′40″W	
SMLI		Lelygebergte Airstrip	Lelygebergte	04°16′05″N 054°44′35″W	
SMLT		Langatabbetje Airstrip	Langatabbetje	04°59′46″N 054°26′30″W	
SMMO	MOJ	Moengo Airstrip	Moengo Marowijne District	05°36′28″N 054°24′00″W	
SMNI	ICK	Major Henk Fernandes Airport	Nieuw-Nickerie (New Nickerie)	05°57′20″N 057°02′25″W	
SMOL		Oelemari Airport	Oelemari	03°06′15″N 054°32′35″W	
SMPA	OEM	Vincent Fayks Airstrip	Paloemeu	03°20′45″N 055°26′30″W	
SMPE		Poeketi Airstrip	Poeketi	04°07′35″N 054°37′25″W	
SMPG		Poesoegroenoe Airstrip	Poesoegroenoe	04°23′52″N 055°47′35″W	
SMPT		Apetina Airstrip	Apetina	03°30′10″N 055°03′30″W	
SMRA		Raleigh Airstrip (Raleighvallen / Voltzberg)	Raleighvallen	04°43′22″N 056°12′30″W	
SMRN		Raghoebarsing Airstrip	Raghoebarsing	04°53′05″N 056°56′25″W	
SMSA		Satrio Airstrip	Satrio	05°47′43″N 056°45′36″W	
SMSI		Sipaliwini Airstrip	Sipaliwini Savanna	02°01′35″N 056°07′35″W	
SMSK		Sarakreek Airstrip	Sarakreek	04°19′10″N 054°58′00″W	
SMSM		Kwamelasemoetoe Airstrip	Kwamelasemoetoe	02°21′15″N 056°47′35″W	
SMST	SMZ	Stoelmans Eiland Airstrip	Stoelmanseiland	04°21′05″N 054°25′05″W	
SMTA		Lawa Tabiki Airstrip	Lawa Tabiki	03°40′45″N 054°05′07″W	
SMTB		Rudi Kappel Airstrip	Tafelberg	03°47′15″N 056°09′00″W	
SMTP	KCB	Tepoe Airstrip (Kassi Kassima)	Pelelu Tepu	03°09′25″N 055°42′58″W	
SMVG		Vier Gebroeders Airstrip	Vier Gebroeders	01°57′45″N 055°55′45″W	
SMVO		Avanavero Airstrip	Avanavero	04°49′30″N 057°17′00″W	
SMWA	AGI	Wageningen Airstrip	Wageningen	05°50′30″N 056°40′15″W	
SMWS	WSO	Washabo Airport	Washabo Apoera	05°12′50″N 057°11′08″W	
SMZO	ORG	Zorg en Hoop Airport	Paramaribo	05°48′40″N 055°11′25″W	
