= La Primavera Airport =

- IATA: LPE; ICAO: SKIM; LID: SK-521

Summary
- Airport type: Public
- Serves: La Primavera, Colombia
- Elevation AMSL: 390 ft / 119 m
- Coordinates: 5°28′45″N 70°25′14″W

Map
- Location of the airport in Colombia

Runways
Direction	Length		Surface
Direction	m	ft	Surface
04/22	1,740	5,709	Asphalt
- Sources: GCM Google Maps

La Primavera Airport (IATA: LPE, ICAO: SKIM) is an airport serving the town of La Primavera, in the Vichada Department of Colombia.

The airport is on the southwest edge of the town, and 6 kilometres (3.7 mi) southeast of the Meta River, the boundary between the Vichada and Casanare Departments of Colombia.

== See also ==
- Transport in Colombia
- List of airports in Colombia
