= Cumaribo Airport =

Colombian airport

- IATA: none; ICAO: SKUM; LID: SK-514

Summary
- Airport type: Public
- Serves: Cumaribo, Colombia
- Elevation AMSL: 550 ft (170 m)
- Coordinates: 4°26′50″N 69°46′52″W

Map
- Location of the airport in Colombia

Runways
Direction	Length		Surface
Direction	m	ft	Surface
03/21	900	2,953	Asphalt
- Sources: OurAirports Google Maps

Cumaribo Airport (ICAO: SKUM) is an airport serving the town of Cumaribo in the Vichada Department of Colombia. The runway is 1 kilometre (0.62 mi) east of the town.

The runway may be undergoing extension on its north end to 1,350 metres (4,430 ft).

== See also ==
- Transport in Colombia
- List of airports in Colombia
