= San Martín Municipality =

San Martín Municipality may refer to:

- San Martín, Cesar
- San Martín, Meta
