= Orocue Airport =

- IATA: ORC; ICAO: SKOE

Summary
- Airport type: Public
- Serves: Orocué, Colombia
- Elevation AMSL: 434 ft / 132 m
- Coordinates: 4°47′24″N 71°20′55″W

Map
- Location of airport in Colombia

Runways
Direction	Length		Surface
Direction	m	ft	Surface
05/23	1,548	5,079	Asphalt
- Source: Google Maps

Orocue Airport (IATA: ORC, ICAO: SKOE) is an airport serving Orocué, a town and municipality in the Casanare Department of Colombia. The runway is adjacent to the western edge of the town, north of the Meta River.

The Carimauga non-directional beacon (Ident: CRG) is 13.3 nautical miles (24.6 km; 15.3 mi) south of the airport.

== See also ==
- Transport in Colombia
- List of airports in Colombia
