= San José de Ocune =

Coordinates: 4°15′N 70°20′W

San Jose de Ocune is a vereda located in the Department of Vichada, Colombia.
