= La Primavera, Vichada =

Coordinates: 5.49056°N 70.4092°W

La Primavera
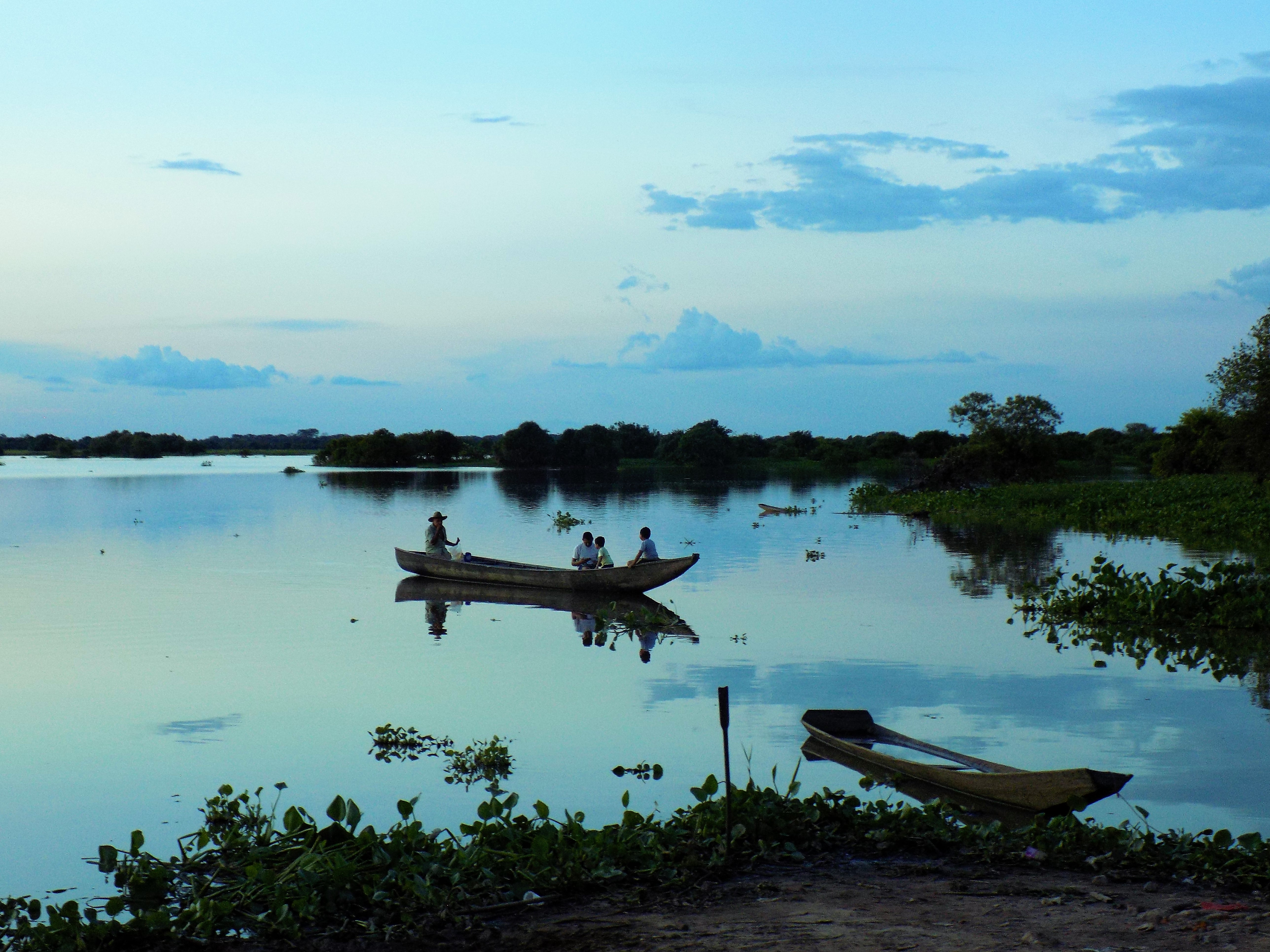

- Flag

- Location of the town and municipality of La Primavera in the Department of Vichada.
- Country: Colombia
- Region: Orinoquía
- Department: Vichada

Area
  - Total: 22,159 km^{2} (8,556 sq mi)

Population (Census 2018)
  - Total: 9,690
  - Density: 0.437/km^{2} (1.13/sq mi)
- Time zone: UTC-5
- Climate: Am
- Website: laprimavera-vichada.gov.co/

La Primavera (literally meaning "The Spring" in Spanish) is a town and municipality located in the Department of Vichada, Colombia.

== History ==
La Primavera was founded by colonizers from other regions of Colombia on 15 July 1959. In 1968 La Primavera became a Colombian National Police Inspection site and in 1972 it became a corregimiento.

In 1987 La Primavera became a municipality, the second in the then Commissary of Vichada. In 1991, the Commissary of Vichada became the Department of Vichada and La Primavera one of its municipalities.

== Geography ==
The municipality of La Primavera borders to the north with the Bolivarian Republic of Venezuela with the Meta river as boundary; to the east with the municipality of Puerto Carreño; to the south with the municipality of Cumaribo and to the west with the municipality of Santa Rosalia.

The geography of La Primavera is predominantly flat as part of the Orinoquia region in the Llanos plains. The region is crossed by numerous rivers affluents of the Meta River basin. The municipality has a total area of 98,970 square kilometres (38,213 sq mi) and the seat of the municipality covers an area of 54,789 square kilometres (21,154 sq mi).

=== Climate ===
La Primavera has a tropical monsoon climate (Köppen Am) with heavy rainfall from April to November and little to very little rain from December to March.

Climate data for La Primavera
Month	Jan	Feb	Mar	Apr	May	Jun	Jul	Aug	Sep	Oct	Nov	Dec	Year
Mean daily maximum °C (°F)	33.4 (92.1)	34.4 (93.9)	34.0 (93.2)	32.2 (90.0)	30.6 (87.1)	29.5 (85.1)	29.4 (84.9)	30.2 (86.4)	31.0 (87.8)	31.4 (88.5)	31.9 (89.4)	32.2 (90.0)	31.7 (89.0)
Daily mean °C (°F)	27.5 (81.5)	28.3 (82.9)	28.5 (83.3)	27.6 (81.7)	26.6 (79.9)	25.8 (78.4)	25.6 (78.1)	26.0 (78.8)	26.6 (79.9)	26.8 (80.2)	27.2 (81.0)	27.2 (81.0)	27.0 (80.6)
Mean daily minimum °C (°F)	21.7 (71.1)	22.3 (72.1)	23.1 (73.6)	23.1 (73.6)	22.6 (72.7)	22.1 (71.8)	21.8 (71.2)	21.9 (71.4)	22.2 (72.0)	22.3 (72.1)	22.6 (72.7)	22.2 (72.0)	22.3 (72.2)
Average rainfall mm (inches)	14.9 (0.59)	21.6 (0.85)	46.4 (1.83)	170.9 (6.73)	335.0 (13.19)	431.3 (16.98)	517.4 (20.37)	359.1 (14.14)	319.7 (12.59)	266.8 (10.50)	162.3 (6.39)	34.1 (1.34)	2,679.5 (105.5)
Average rainy days	1	1	3	8	14	17	18	14	13	12	7	2	110
Source 1:
Source 2:

== Economy ==
Ranching is the main economic activity in the municipality of La Primavera. Agriculture is practiced for subsistence and produces mainly cotton, maize and plantain. The municipality is developing its artisan fishing, commercializing some 30 varieties of fish for export to the Colombian capital city Bogotá. The government is studying the possibility of exploiting titanium deposits and exploring oil fields.
