= Morichales de Paz de Ariporo =

- Humedales de Casanare
- IUCN category II (national park)
- Location within Colombia
- Nearest city: Yopal
- Coordinates: 5°51′48″N 71°48′54″W

The Morichales de Paz de Ariporo is a proposed national park in Casanare Department of Colombia. It was formerly referred to as the Humedales de Casanare. The area holds the largest extension of wetlands in eastern Colombia.

The park has many stands of Moriche palm (Mauritia flexuosa) that exist throughout the wetlands.

== See also ==
- Orinoquía Region, Colombia
