= Cumaribo =

- town

- Flag Seal

- Location of Cumaribo in Vichada

- Location in Colombia
- Coordinates: 04°26′00″N 69°48′00″W
- Country: Colombia
- Region: Orinoquía
- Department: Vichada
- Foundation: 1959

Government
  - Mayor: Aldemar Gomez Gonzalez

Area
  - Total: 65,193 km^{2} (25,171 sq mi)

Population (2010)
  - Total: 23,990
  - Density: 0.3680/km^{2} (0.9531/sq mi)
- Time zone: UTC-5
- Postal code: 991001
- Demonym: cumaribense
- Climate: Am
- Website: cumaribo-vichada.gov.co/

Cumaribo is a town and municipality located in the Department of Vichada, Republic of Colombia. Cumaribo was founded by Jose Nicolino Mattar in 1959.

In 2005 the municipality had an estimated total population of 28,718 inhabitants, 4,312 of these living in the head of the municipality or urban area. With an area of 65,193 square kilometres or 25,171 square miles, about the size of Lithuania, it is the largest municipality in Colombia.

== Geography ==
The municipality of Cumaribo borders to the north with the other three municipalities of the Department of Vichada; La Primavera, Puerto Carreño and Santa Rosalia; to the east with the Bolivarian Republic of Venezuela; to the south with the Department of Guainía; and to the west with the departments of Meta and Guaviare.

Cumaribo is within the Orinoquia Region of Colombia part of the Llanos plains that cover part of Colombia and the Bolivarian Republic of Venezuela. Three-quarters of the total area of the municipality of Cumaribo is savanna and the rest is covered by jungle with some small mounts including the Mount Vichada, Mount Mona, Mount Matavenia and Mount Guaripa.

There are three important rivers basins within the range of the municipality; the Orinoco River, the Meta River and the Guaviare River. The Meta river flows into the Orinoco river and the Guaviare river is the main current for the Muro, Uva and Mataven rivers. There are also two main lakes within the municipality; the Lake Caimán and the Lake Sesema.

=== Climate ===
Cumaribo has a tropical monsoon climate (Köppen Am) with heavy rainfall in all months except January and February. Temperatures are consistently very warm to hot – between 27 and 30 °C (80.6 and 86.0 °F) throughout the year – and humidity very high.

Climate data for Cumaribo (Gaviotas Las), elevation 171 m (561 ft), (1981–2010)
Month	Jan	Feb	Mar	Apr	May	Jun	Jul	Aug	Sep	Oct	Nov	Dec	Year
Mean daily maximum °C (°F)	33.0 (91.4)	33.8 (92.8)	33.6 (92.5)	31.7 (89.1)	30.4 (86.7)	29.5 (85.1)	29.4 (84.9)	30.3 (86.5)	31.2 (88.2)	31.5 (88.7)	31.4 (88.5)	31.7 (89.1)	31.5 (88.7)
Daily mean °C (°F)	27.3 (81.1)	27.8 (82.0)	27.6 (81.7)	26.3 (79.3)	25.6 (78.1)	25.0 (77.0)	24.6 (76.3)	25.1 (77.2)	25.6 (78.1)	25.9 (78.6)	26.1 (79.0)	26.4 (79.5)	26.1 (79.0)
Mean daily minimum °C (°F)	21.2 (70.2)	21.8 (71.2)	22.3 (72.1)	22.7 (72.9)	22.6 (72.7)	22.1 (71.8)	21.7 (71.1)	21.8 (71.2)	22.1 (71.8)	22.3 (72.1)	22.4 (72.3)	22.0 (71.6)	22.1 (71.8)
Average precipitation mm (inches)	33.7 (1.33)	57.9 (2.28)	123.1 (4.85)	307.3 (12.10)	377.3 (14.85)	420.4 (16.55)	365.8 (14.40)	292.4 (11.51)	277.6 (10.93)	253.1 (9.96)	226.2 (8.91)	101.4 (3.99)	2,836.4 (111.67)
Average precipitation days	4	6	9	19	24	25	25	23	20	20	16	9	197
Average relative humidity (%)	67	66	71	82	87	88	87	86	85	84	83	77	80
Mean monthly sunshine hours	254.2	203.3	167.4	132.0	117.8	111.0	120.9	130.2	150.0	164.3	171.0	217.0	1,939.1
Mean daily sunshine hours	8.2	7.2	5.4	4.4	3.8	3.7	3.9	4.2	5.0	5.3	5.7	7.0	5.3
Source: Instituto de Hidrologia Meteorologia y Estudios Ambientales

Climate data for Cumaribo (Tapon El), elevation 315 m (1,033 ft), (1981–2010)
Month	Jan	Feb	Mar	Apr	May	Jun	Jul	Aug	Sep	Oct	Nov	Dec	Year
Mean daily maximum °C (°F)	34.1 (93.4)	34.4 (93.9)	34.5 (94.1)	32.3 (90.1)	31.1 (88.0)	30.2 (86.4)	29.9 (85.8)	30.7 (87.3)	31.7 (89.1)	32.1 (89.8)	32.5 (90.5)	33.2 (91.8)	32.2 (90.0)
Daily mean °C (°F)	27.8 (82.0)	28.2 (82.8)	28.0 (82.4)	26.8 (80.2)	26.0 (78.8)	25.5 (77.9)	25.0 (77.0)	25.4 (77.7)	26.0 (78.8)	26.3 (79.3)	26.6 (79.9)	27.1 (80.8)	26.5 (79.7)
Mean daily minimum °C (°F)	21.6 (70.9)	21.9 (71.4)	22.3 (72.1)	22.6 (72.7)	22.4 (72.3)	21.8 (71.2)	21.4 (70.5)	21.9 (71.4)	22.0 (71.6)	22.2 (72.0)	22.1 (71.8)	22.1 (71.8)	22.0 (71.6)
Average precipitation mm (inches)	33.2 (1.31)	81.6 (3.21)	108.8 (4.28)	232.6 (9.16)	358.5 (14.11)	423.4 (16.67)	406.0 (15.98)	356.9 (14.05)	304.1 (11.97)	291.4 (11.47)	216.7 (8.53)	93.5 (3.68)	2,906.9 (114.44)
Average precipitation days	4	6	8	15	20	21	22	20	17	16	13	9	165
Mean monthly sunshine hours	248.0	208.9	195.3	141.0	114.7	114.0	120.9	130.2	147.0	158.1	183.0	220.1	1,981.2
Mean daily sunshine hours	8.0	7.4	6.3	4.7	3.7	3.8	3.9	4.2	4.9	5.1	6.1	7.1	5.4
Source: Instituto de Hidrologia Meteorologia y Estudios Ambientales

Climate data for Cumaribo (Tuparro Bocas Tomo), elevation 250 m (820 ft), (1981–2010)
Month	Jan	Feb	Mar	Apr	May	Jun	Jul	Aug	Sep	Oct	Nov	Dec	Year
Mean daily maximum °C (°F)	35.0 (95.0)	35.0 (95.0)	34.9 (94.8)	33.1 (91.6)	32.0 (89.6)	31.0 (87.8)	30.6 (87.1)	31.4 (88.5)	31.9 (89.4)	33.2 (91.8)	33.2 (91.8)	34.0 (93.2)	32.8 (91.0)
Daily mean °C (°F)	28.5 (83.3)	28.8 (83.8)	29.0 (84.2)	27.9 (82.2)	26.9 (80.4)	26.2 (79.2)	26.0 (78.8)	26.5 (79.7)	26.9 (80.4)	27.3 (81.1)	27.6 (81.7)	27.9 (82.2)	27.5 (81.5)
Mean daily minimum °C (°F)	22.7 (72.9)	22.3 (72.1)	23.6 (74.5)	23.2 (73.8)	22.7 (72.9)	22.0 (71.6)	22.1 (71.8)	22.2 (72.0)	22.9 (73.2)	22.5 (72.5)	22.6 (72.7)	21.5 (70.7)	22.5 (72.5)
Average precipitation mm (inches)	43.8 (1.72)	45.9 (1.81)	81.1 (3.19)	200.4 (7.89)	354.8 (13.97)	456.7 (17.98)	465.3 (18.32)	323.1 (12.72)	222.2 (8.75)	209.7 (8.26)	173.6 (6.83)	76.2 (3.00)	2,652.8 (104.44)
Average precipitation days	4	5	7	12	20	21	23	19	15	16	13	7	154
Average relative humidity (%)	73	73	72	82	86	87	86	85	85	84	82	79	81
Mean monthly sunshine hours	257.3	223.0	207.7	156.0	139.5	117.0	136.4	155.0	159.0	186.0	198.0	244.9	2,179.8
Mean daily sunshine hours	8.3	7.9	6.7	5.2	4.5	3.9	4.4	5.0	5.3	6.0	6.6	7.9	6.0
Source: Instituto de Hidrologia Meteorologia y Estudios Ambientales

== History ==
Cumaribo was officially founded by colonizers led by Jose Nicolino Mattar in 1959 but was inhabited previously by indigenous peoples such as the Guahibo.

=== Colombian armed conflict ===
The area has been under the influence of the Revolutionary Armed Forces of Colombia (FARC) guerrilla group due to the large production of coca leaves in the region and difficult access for the Military of Colombia. Tomás Medina Caracas, a prominent FARC commander in charge of the illegal drug trade for this organization was killed on 1 September 2007 in a Colombian Army military operation in eastern Colombia within the municipality of Cumaribo near the border with Venezuela.

== Demography ==
According to a census of 2001, the population at the head of the municipality was of 1055 inhabitants, 534 males, 521 females. Children between 0–14 years old was of 418 of which 206 were male and 212 female. Young adults between 15–24 years old is of 208 of which 95 were male and 113 female. Adults between the ages of 25 and 49 years old was of 358 of which 186 were male and 172 female. 49 and older were 71 people of which 47 were male and 24 female. More than half of the population were colonizers, 35% indigenous and a 15% mestizos.

=== Indigenous reserves in Cumaribo ===
The municipality of Cumaribo has some 38 indigenous reserves. The indigenous are predominantly the Guahibo people, Curripaco and Piapoco peoples pertaining to the Arawak language family, and the Cuiva, Desana, puinave and Saliva peoples.

1. Santa Teresita del Tuparro*
2. Tomo Bebery
3. El Merey
4. San Luis del Tomo
5. La Esmeralda
6. Valdivia
7. Tsololoibo Matatu
8. Muco Guarrojo
9. Rawaneruba
10. Saracure
11. Únuma
12. Concordia
13. Barranco Lindo
14. Corocora
15. Palomas Carpintero
16. Guaco
17. Chocón
18. Laguna Colorada
19. Cali
20. Minitas
21. Morocoto-Buenavista-Manajuare
22. Giro
23. Yurí
24. Cumaral
25. Barranquito – Laguna Colorada
26. Caño Bocón
27. Laguna Anguilla – La Macarena
28. Sejalito – San Benito
29. Lagunas Negra y Cacao
30. Berrocal – Ajota
31. Matavén – Fruta
32. Caño Zama
33. Atana Pirariame
34. Equa Guarracañá
35. Bajo Vichada
36. Aiwa Cuna Tsepajibo
37. Caño Cavasi
38. Guacamayas.
