= Orocué =

- Municipality and town
- Flag
- Nicknames: San Miguel del Macuco, Caño San Miguel
- Location of the municipality and town of Orocue in the Casanare Department of Colombia
- Coordinates: 1°48′34″N 72°45′37″W
- Country: Colombia
- Region: Orinoquía Region
- Department: Casanare Department
- Established: 1 Jan. 1850 or Aug. 1858

Area
  - Municipality and town: 41.777 km^{2} (16.130 sq mi)
  - Urban: 8.24 km^{2} (3.18 sq mi)
- Elevation: 187 m (614 ft)

Population (2012)
  - Municipality and town: 8,102
- Time zone: UTC-5 (Colombia Standard Time)
- Website: https://www.orocue-casanare.gov.co

Orocué is a town and municipality in the Department of Casanare, Colombia, located on the shore of the Meta River. Historically, it went by the name San Miguel del Macuco.

It is located 180 km from Yopal, and 546 km from Bogotá.

== Climate ==
Orocué has a tropical monsoon climate (Köppen Am) with moderate to little rainfall from December to March and heavy rainfall from April to November.

Climate data for Orocué (Modulos), elevation 130 m (430 ft), (1981–2010)
Month	Jan	Feb	Mar	Apr	May	Jun	Jul	Aug	Sep	Oct	Nov	Dec	Year
Mean daily maximum °C (°F)	33.1 (91.6)	34.1 (93.4)	34.1 (93.4)	32.4 (90.3)	31.3 (88.3)	30.3 (86.5)	30.2 (86.4)	30.8 (87.4)	31.7 (89.1)	31.9 (89.4)	32.0 (89.6)	32.0 (89.6)	32.0 (89.6)
Daily mean °C (°F)	27.4 (81.3)	28.2 (82.8)	28.2 (82.8)	26.9 (80.4)	26.2 (79.2)	25.6 (78.1)	25.5 (77.9)	25.9 (78.6)	26.5 (79.7)	26.7 (80.1)	26.9 (80.4)	27.0 (80.6)	26.7 (80.1)
Mean daily minimum °C (°F)	20.6 (69.1)	20.9 (69.6)	21.5 (70.7)	21.8 (71.2)	22.0 (71.6)	22.0 (71.6)	21.7 (71.1)	21.8 (71.2)	21.9 (71.4)	22.2 (72.0)	22.5 (72.5)	21.7 (71.1)	21.7 (71.1)
Average rainfall mm (inches)	16.4 (0.65)	38.2 (1.50)	81.9 (3.22)	228.0 (8.98)	322.7 (12.70)	385.1 (15.16)	309.1 (12.17)	281.5 (11.08)	225.8 (8.89)	217.9 (8.58)	158.5 (6.24)	39.7 (1.56)	2,304.8 (90.74)
Average rainy days	2	5	7	15	21	21	21	19	16	15	10	4	152
Average relative humidity (%)	72	71	71	80	85	86	85	85	83	82	81	77	80
Mean monthly sunshine hours	254.2	197.6	161.2	135.0	130.2	123.0	130.2	139.5	156.0	170.5	183.0	238.7	2,019.1
Mean daily sunshine hours	8.2	7.0	5.2	4.5	4.2	4.1	4.2	4.5	5.2	5.5	6.1	7.7	5.5
Source: Instituto de Hidrologia Meteorologia y Estudios Ambientales

== See also ==
- Orocue Airport
