= Ricaurte, Cundinamarca =

Ricaurte
- Municipality and town
- Flag Coat of arms

- Location of the municipality and town inside Cundinamarca Department of Colombia

- Location in Colombia
- Coordinates: 4°16′45″N 74°46′22″W
- Country: Colombia
- Department: Cundinamarca

Area
  - Municipality and town: 128.3 km^{2} (49.5 sq mi)
  - Urban: 13.5 km^{2} (5.2 sq mi)
- Elevation: 284 m (932 ft)

Population (2018 census)
  - Municipality and town: 12,881
  - Density: 100.4/km^{2} (260.0/sq mi)
  - Urban: 6,857
  - Urban density: 508/km^{2} (1,320/sq mi)
- Time zone: UTC-5 (Colombia Standard Time)

Ricaurte is a municipality and town of Colombia in the department of Cundinamarca. A law issued on 14 November 1857 created the Peñalisa District and December of the same year the name was changed to Ricaurte; in 1937 it was annexed to the Girardot municipality but it recovered its condition of municipality in 1968.

== Other Facts ==
- Market Day: Thursday and Sunday
- Distance from Bogotá: 142 km
- Foundation: 1813 as Peñalisa
- Created: Departamental Decree No. 409 of 11 March 1968
- Median temperature: 27 °C

== Veredas ==
The Municipality of Ricaurte has 16 Veredas, 17 within the Urban Zone. The Veredas are:

- Callejón, Casablanca, Cumaca, El Paso, El Portal, La Carrera, La Tetilla, La Virginia, Las Veras, Llano del Pozo, Limoncito, Manuel Norte, Manuel Sur, Pto Peñalisa, San Francisco, San Martin and Zona Urbana
