= Palmas del Socorro =

Coordinates: 6.40722°N 73.2883°W

Palmas Socorro
- Municipality and town
- Flag

- Location of the municipality and town of Palmas Socorro in the Santander Department of Colombia.
- Country: Colombia
- Department: Santander Department
- Elevation: 1,200 m (3,900 ft)
- Time zone: UTC-5 (Colombia Standard Time)

Palmas Socorro is a town and municipality in the Santander Department in northeastern Colombia.
