= San Alberto, Cesar =

Coordinates: 7.7525°N 73.3892°W

- Town
- Flag Coat of arms

- Location of the municipality and town of San Alberto in the Department of Cesar.
- Country: Colombia
- Region: Caribbean
- Department: Cesar

Government
  - Mayor: Robiel Pérez Estupiñán (Colombian Liberal Party)

Population (Census 2018)
  - Total: 23,040
- Time zone: UTC-5
- Website: www.sanalberto-cesar.gov.co

San Alberto is a town and municipality in the Colombian Department of Cesar.

== Description ==
The flag of San Alberto is diagonally divided (bottom hoist to upper fly) golden yellow forest green with boarder stripe in sky blue. The flag has an African palm tree with five stars around it. San Alberto is a municipality since 20 May 1995.
