= Puerto Parra =

Coordinates: 6°39′N 74°04′W

- Municipality and town
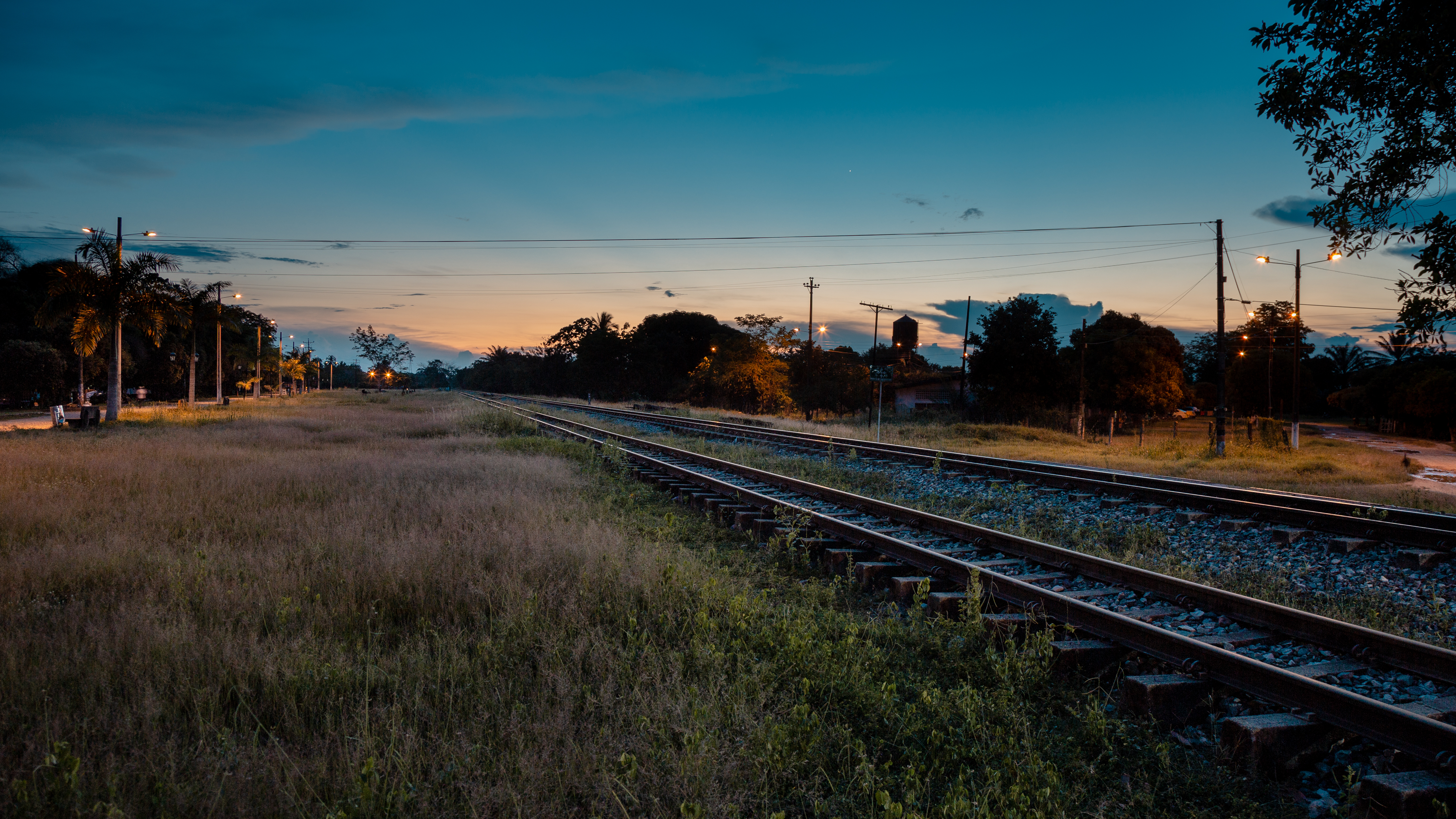
- Estación Carare - Puerto Parra

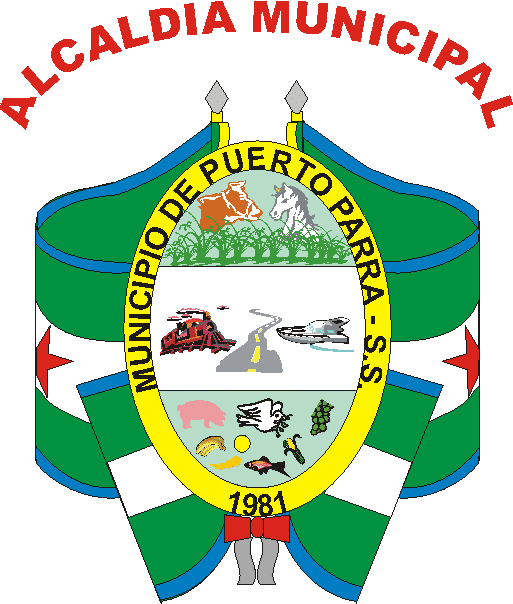
- Flag Coat of arms

- Location of the municipality and town of Puerto Parra in the Santander Department of Colombia
- Country: Colombia
- Department: Santander Department
- Founded: March 4, 2008
- Founder: Aquileo Parra

Area
  - Total: 1,452 km^{2} (561 sq mi)

Population (2005)
  - Total: 6,462
  - Density: 4.450/km^{2} (11.53/sq mi)
- Demonym: Puerto Parrences
- Time zone: UTC-5 (Colombia Standard Time)
- Website: www.puertoparra-santander.gov.co

Puerto Parra is a town and municipality in the Santander Department in northeastern Colombia.

== Climate ==
Climate data for Puerto Parra (Carare), elevation 168 m (551 ft), (1981–2010)
Month	Jan	Feb	Mar	Apr	May	Jun	Jul	Aug	Sep	Oct	Nov	Dec	Year
Mean daily maximum °C (°F)	33.0 (91.4)	33.2 (91.8)	32.8 (91.0)	32.4 (90.3)	32.3 (90.1)	32.3 (90.1)	32.9 (91.2)	32.8 (91.0)	32.1 (89.8)	31.6 (88.9)	31.8 (89.2)	32.2 (90.0)	32.4 (90.3)
Daily mean °C (°F)	28.3 (82.9)	28.7 (83.7)	28.5 (83.3)	28.2 (82.8)	28.1 (82.6)	28.2 (82.8)	28.4 (83.1)	28.3 (82.9)	28.1 (82.6)	27.8 (82.0)	27.9 (82.2)	28.2 (82.8)	28.2 (82.8)
Mean daily minimum °C (°F)	22.8 (73.0)	23.2 (73.8)	23.2 (73.8)	23.2 (73.8)	23.1 (73.6)	23.1 (73.6)	22.8 (73.0)	22.8 (73.0)	22.6 (72.7)	22.7 (72.9)	23.1 (73.6)	23.2 (73.8)	23.0 (73.4)
Average precipitation mm (inches)	74.5 (2.93)	99.0 (3.90)	184.7 (7.27)	293.0 (11.54)	315.2 (12.41)	242.5 (9.55)	237.7 (9.36)	255.5 (10.06)	359.5 (14.15)	395.3 (15.56)	276.6 (10.89)	155.1 (6.11)	2,888.5 (113.72)
Average precipitation days	7	9	12	16	18	17	16	17	19	19	16	10	169
Average relative humidity (%)	81	79	81	83	82	82	81	81	82	83	83	83	82
Source: Instituto de Hidrologia Meteorologia y Estudios Ambientales

Climate data for Puerto Parra (Campo Capote), elevation 180 m (590 ft), (1981–2010)
Month	Jan	Feb	Mar	Apr	May	Jun	Jul	Aug	Sep	Oct	Nov	Dec	Year
Mean daily maximum °C (°F)	32.9 (91.2)	33.2 (91.8)	32.7 (90.9)	32.5 (90.5)	32.5 (90.5)	32.7 (90.9)	33.1 (91.6)	32.9 (91.2)	32.3 (90.1)	31.7 (89.1)	31.9 (89.4)	32.2 (90.0)	32.5 (90.5)
Daily mean °C (°F)	26.8 (80.2)	26.9 (80.4)	26.8 (80.2)	26.8 (80.2)	26.9 (80.4)	27.0 (80.6)	27.0 (80.6)	27.0 (80.6)	26.7 (80.1)	26.4 (79.5)	26.5 (79.7)	26.6 (79.9)	26.8 (80.2)
Mean daily minimum °C (°F)	22.5 (72.5)	22.8 (73.0)	22.9 (73.2)	23.0 (73.4)	22.9 (73.2)	22.8 (73.0)	22.5 (72.5)	22.6 (72.7)	22.5 (72.5)	22.4 (72.3)	22.6 (72.7)	22.8 (73.0)	22.7 (72.9)
Average precipitation mm (inches)	103 (4.1)	152.3 (6.00)	220.7 (8.69)	335.1 (13.19)	323.5 (12.74)	213.6 (8.41)	164.9 (6.49)	169.1 (6.66)	264.8 (10.43)	343.2 (13.51)	271.7 (10.70)	155.8 (6.13)	2,717.5 (106.99)
Average precipitation days	6	8	12	15	18	17	16	18	19	17	16	10	163
Average relative humidity (%)	83	83	83	84	84	84	82	82	83	85	85	85	84
Mean monthly sunshine hours	186.0	155.3	136.4	138.0	164.3	171.0	204.6	189.1	171.0	158.1	156.0	173.6	2,003.4
Mean daily sunshine hours	6.0	5.5	4.4	4.6	5.3	5.7	6.6	6.1	5.7	5.1	5.2	5.6	5.5
Source: Instituto de Hidrologia Meteorologia y Estudios Ambientales
