= Puerto Rico, Meta =

- Municipality and town

- Flag

- Location in Colombia
- Coordinates: 2°56′18″N 73°12′30″W
- Country: Colombia
- Department: Meta Department
- Region: Ariari

Government
  - Mayor: José Manuel Guerrero Aguirre

Area
  - Total: 3,431 km^{2} (1,325 sq mi)
- Elevation: 299 m (981 ft)

Population (Census 2018)
  - Total: 11,433
  - Density: 3.332/km^{2} (8.631/sq mi)
- Demonym: Puertoriqueños
- Time zone: UTC-5 (Colombia Standard Time)
- Climate: Am
- Website: Official website

Puerto Rico is a town and municipality in the Meta Department, Colombia.
