= Saldaña, Tolima =

Coordinates: 3.93472°N 75.0203°W

Saldaña, Colombia
- Municipality and town
- Flag Coat of arms

- Location of the municipality and town of Saldaña, Colombia in the Tolima Department of Colombia.
- Country: Colombia
- Department: Tolima Department

Government
  - mayor: Jorge Lozano Arciniegas

Area
  - Total: 214 km^{2} (83 sq mi)
- Elevation: 305 m (1,001 ft)

Population (2017)
  - Total: 14,329
- Time zone: UTC-5 (Colombia Standard Time)

Saldaña is a town and municipality in the Tolima department of Colombia. Saldaña is where nearly 30% of Colombian rice is grown, and most of them work in the rice business. The population of the municipality was 14,329 as of the 2017 census.

== Climate ==
Climate data for Saldaña (Jabalcon), elevation 425 m (1,394 ft), (1981–2010)
Month	Jan	Feb	Mar	Apr	May	Jun	Jul	Aug	Sep	Oct	Nov	Dec	Year
Mean daily maximum °C (°F)	33.0 (91.4)	33.1 (91.6)	32.8 (91.0)	32.2 (90.0)	32.3 (90.1)	32.9 (91.2)	33.9 (93.0)	34.9 (94.8)	34.0 (93.2)	32.6 (90.7)	31.8 (89.2)	32.1 (89.8)	33.0 (91.4)
Daily mean °C (°F)	28.0 (82.4)	28.0 (82.4)	27.9 (82.2)	27.6 (81.7)	27.7 (81.9)	27.8 (82.0)	28.3 (82.9)	29.1 (84.4)	28.6 (83.5)	27.7 (81.9)	27.4 (81.3)	27.5 (81.5)	28.0 (82.4)
Mean daily minimum °C (°F)	22.5 (72.5)	22.4 (72.3)	22.4 (72.3)	22.4 (72.3)	22.3 (72.1)	22.3 (72.1)	22.3 (72.1)	22.7 (72.9)	22.4 (72.3)	22.1 (71.8)	22.3 (72.1)	22.4 (72.3)	22.4 (72.3)
Average precipitation mm (inches)	94.0 (3.70)	115.5 (4.55)	150.4 (5.92)	209.2 (8.24)	167.2 (6.58)	58.6 (2.31)	49.1 (1.93)	47.1 (1.85)	116.7 (4.59)	198.0 (7.80)	178.2 (7.02)	131.4 (5.17)	1,515.5 (59.67)
Average precipitation days	8	10	12	14	13	8	7	5	9	15	13	11	123
Average relative humidity (%)	74	74	75	78	76	73	68	63	67	75	77	78	73
Mean monthly sunshine hours	207.7	166.6	158.1	147.0	155.0	159.0	179.8	182.9	171.0	179.8	174.0	195.3	2,076.2
Mean daily sunshine hours	6.7	5.9	5.1	4.9	5.0	5.3	5.8	5.9	5.7	5.8	5.8	6.3	5.7
Source: Instituto de Hidrologia Meteorologia y Estudios Ambientales
