= Puerto Rondón =

Coordinates: 6°17′N 71°06′W

- Municipality and town
- Flag

- Location of the municipality and town of Puerto Rondón in the Arauca Department of Colombia
- Country: Colombia
- Department: Arauca Department
- Founded: December 15, 1924

Government
  - Mayor: Sandra Milena Gutierrez Vigott

Area
  - Municipality and town: 2,186 km^{2} (844 sq mi)
- Elevation: 190 m (620 ft)

Population (2015)
  - Municipality and town: 3,844
  - Density: 1.76/km^{2} (4.6/sq mi)
  - Urban: 2,864
- Time zone: UTC-5 (Colombia Standard Time)
- Climate: Am

Puerto Rondón is a town and municipality in the Arauca Department, Colombia.
