= Cumaral =

- Municipality and town
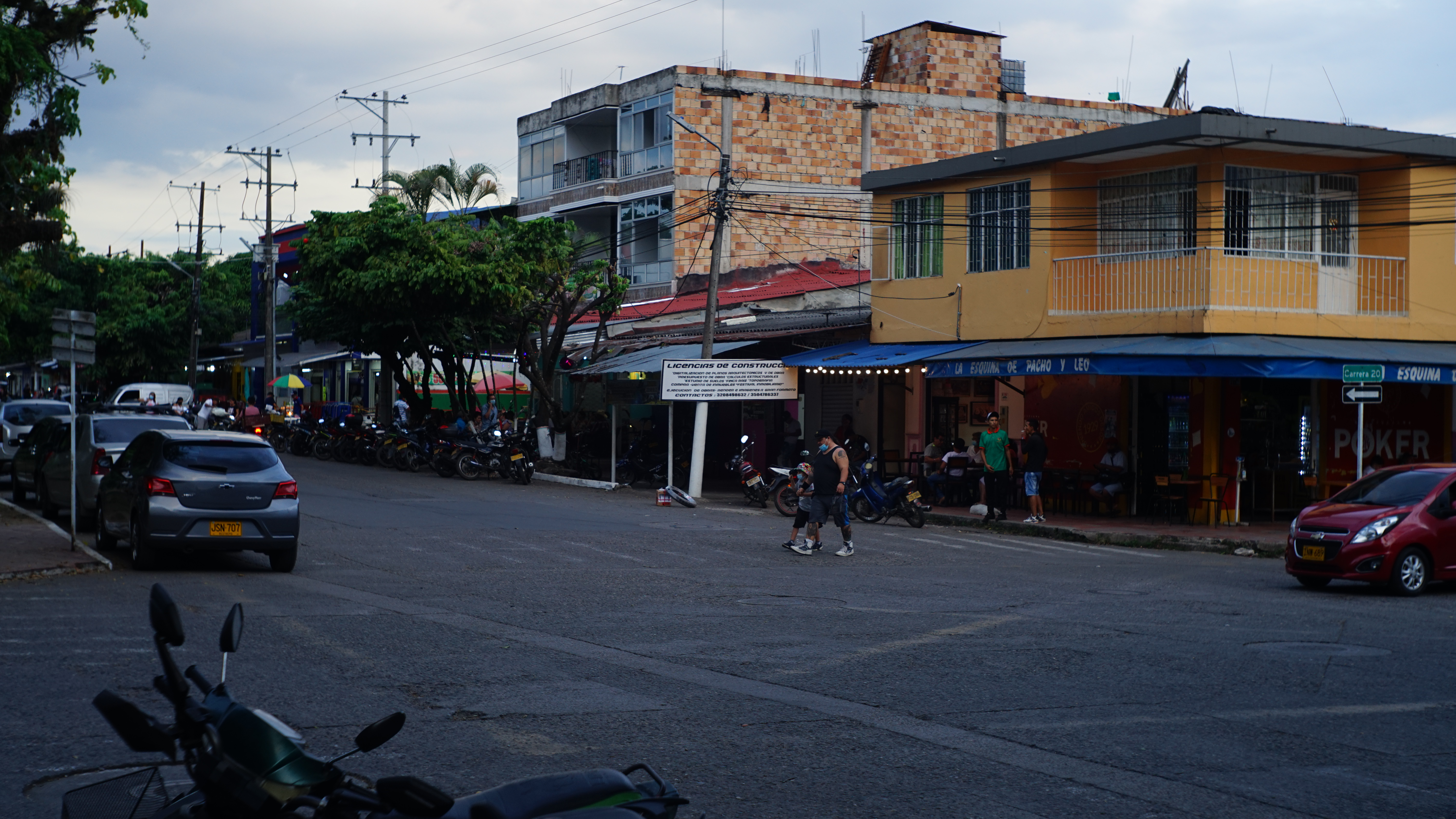
- Carrera 20 in Cumaral

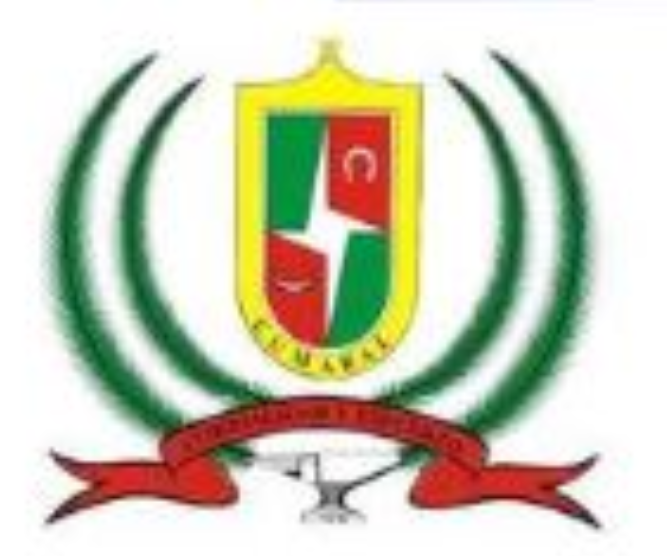
- Flag Coat of arms

- Location of the municipality and town of Cumaral in the department of Meta.
- Coordinates: 4°16′10″N 73°29′11″W
- Country: Colombia
- Department: Meta
- Founded: July 3, 1901
- Named for: Cumare palm

Government
  - Alcalde: Albeiro Serna

Area
  - Total: 580 km^{2} (220 sq mi)
- Elevation: 452 m (1,483 ft)

Population (Census 2018)
  - Total: 21,397
  - Density: 37/km^{2} (96/sq mi)
- Time zone: UTC-5 (Colombia Standard Time)
- Website: Official Website of Cumaral

Cumaral is a town and municipality in the Colombian department of Meta.

== Name ==
The municipality derives its name from the abundance of Cumare palms that were prevalent during its early years of establishment.

== History ==
Cumaral was officially founded in 1901 at a site known as "Laguna Brava" or "Laguna del Pueblo", but an outbreak of yellow fever forced the relocation of its inhabitants. By 1917, settlers moved to an area with cumare palm plantations called "Tierra Alta." The settlement was initially referred to as "Boca de Monte."

The earliest records of Cumaral's history were documented by Father Fray Agustín Gómez, Parish Priest of San Juan de Arama. In a report dated October 15, 1750, addressed to Father Fray Clemente Forero, commissioner of the Llanero reductions, Father Gómez mentioned various indigenous tribes, including the Camoas of San Martín. He also noted that indigenous people had long inhabited the area inland from the original town of Cumaral, which had ceased to exist by that time.

Modern-day Cumaral began to take shape in 1917, approximately six kilometers north of Laguna del Pueblo, near the Guacavía River. This new settlement was founded on land donated by General Avelino Rosas. Initially named Boca de Monte, the settlement marked the boundary between the dense jungle covering the foothills from Villavicencio to Restrepo and the start of the savanna. The founding of Boca de Monte was spearheaded by notable figures, including Manuel Saavedra Hernández, Eustorgio Pinzón Machado, Faustino Pulido Rojas, Próspero A. Peña, Jorge Varela, José Genay, David Hernández, and Oliverio Castro.

== Political-Administrative Division ==
In addition to its municipal seat. Cumaral has jurisdiction over the following populated centers:

   Guacavía
   Presentado
   San Nicolás
   Veracruz

== Geography ==
Cumaral has a typical landscape of the Llanero foothills, featuring a flat topography with formations of undulations and estuaries.

== Climate ==
Climate data for Cumural (Cabana La Hda), elevation 305 m (1,001 ft), (1981–2010)
| Month | Jan | Feb | Mar | Apr | May | Jun | Jul | Aug | Sep | Oct | Nov | Dec | Year |
|---|---|---|---|---|---|---|---|---|---|---|---|---|---|
| Mean daily maximum °C (°F) | 32.8 (91.0) | 33.4 (92.1) | 32.5 (90.5) | 31.0 (87.8) | 30.2 (86.4) | 29.3 (84.7) | 29.1 (84.4) | 30.0 (86.0) | 30.8 (87.4) | 31.0 (87.8) | 31.0 (87.8) | 31.5 (88.7) | 31.1 (88.0) |
| Daily mean °C (°F) | 26.7 (80.1) | 27.0 (80.6) | 26.6 (79.9) | 25.6 (78.1) | 25.2 (77.4) | 24.6 (76.3) | 24.3 (75.7) | 24.9 (76.8) | 25.4 (77.7) | 25.5 (77.9) | 25.7 (78.3) | 26.0 (78.8) | 25.6 (78.1) |
| Mean daily minimum °C (°F) | 21.3 (70.3) | 21.8 (71.2) | 22.2 (72.0) | 22.0 (71.6) | 21.7 (71.1) | 21.3 (70.3) | 20.9 (69.6) | 21.1 (70.0) | 21.4 (70.5) | 21.6 (70.9) | 21.8 (71.2) | 21.5 (70.7) | 21.6 (70.9) |
| Average precipitation mm (inches) | 41.1 (1.62) | 96.0 (3.78) | 169.9 (6.69) | 421.6 (16.60) | 490.3 (19.30) | 431.3 (16.98) | 386.4 (15.21) | 295.3 (11.63) | 327.1 (12.88) | 350.7 (13.81) | 292.3 (11.51) | 100.9 (3.97) | 3,365.1 (132.48) |
| Average precipitation days | 5 | 8 | 13 | 21 | 24 | 24 | 23 | 21 | 19 | 19 | 16 | 9 | 199 |
| Average relative humidity (%) | 73 | 73 | 77 | 84 | 86 | 87 | 87 | 84 | 83 | 83 | 83 | 80 | 82 |
| Mean monthly sunshine hours | 176.7 | 144.0 | 111.6 | 105.0 | 108.5 | 99.0 | 102.3 | 124.0 | 144.0 | 148.8 | 153.0 | 173.6 | 1,590.5 |
| Mean daily sunshine hours | 5.7 | 5.1 | 3.6 | 3.5 | 3.5 | 3.3 | 3.3 | 4.0 | 4.8 | 4.8 | 5.1 | 5.6 | 4.4 |
Source: Instituto de Hidrologia Meteorologia y Estudios Ambientales
