= Lérida, Tolima =

Coordinates: 4°54′N 74°55′W

- Municipality and town
- Flag Coat of arms

- Location of the municipality and town of Lérida, Tolima in the Tolima Department of Colombia.
- Country: Colombia
- Department: Tolima Department

Government
  - Mayor: Carolina Hurtado Barrera

Area
  - Total: 269.6 km^{2} (104.1 sq mi)
- Elevation: 366 m (1,201 ft)

Population (2017)
  - Total: 17,197
  - Density: 63.79/km^{2} (165.2/sq mi)
- Time zone: UTC-5 (Colombia Standard Time)

Lérida (Spanish pronunciation: [ˈleɾiða]) is a town and municipality in the Tolima department of Colombia. The population of the municipality was 20,153 as of the 1993 census.
