= San Martín, Cesar =

Coordinates: 8°02′50″N 73°30′55″W

- Town
- Flag

- Location of the municipality and town of San Martín in the Department of Cesar.
- Country: Colombia
- Region: Caribbean
- Department: Cesar

Government
  - Mayor: Elber José Guerra (Convergencia Ciudadana)

Population (Census 2018)
  - Total: 20,452
- Time zone: UTC-5
- Website: www.sanmartin-cesar.gov.co

San Martín is a town and municipality in the Colombian Department of Cesar.
