= Vichada Department =

Department of Colombia

Vichada Department Departamento del Vichada
- Department
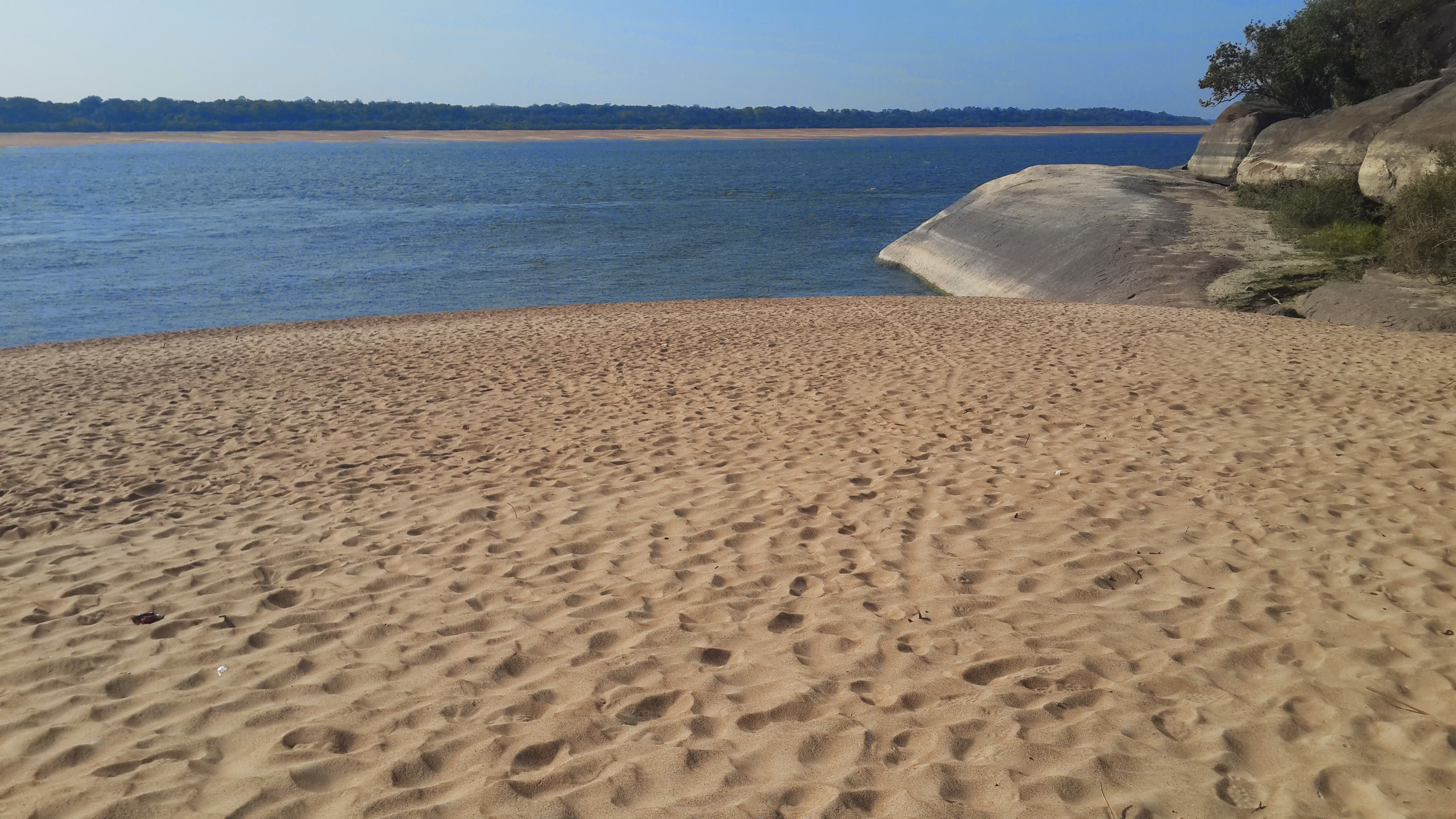
- Beach on the Orinoco River

- Flag Coat of arms
- Motto: Tierra de hombres para hombres sin tierra Land of men for men without land
- Vichada shown in red

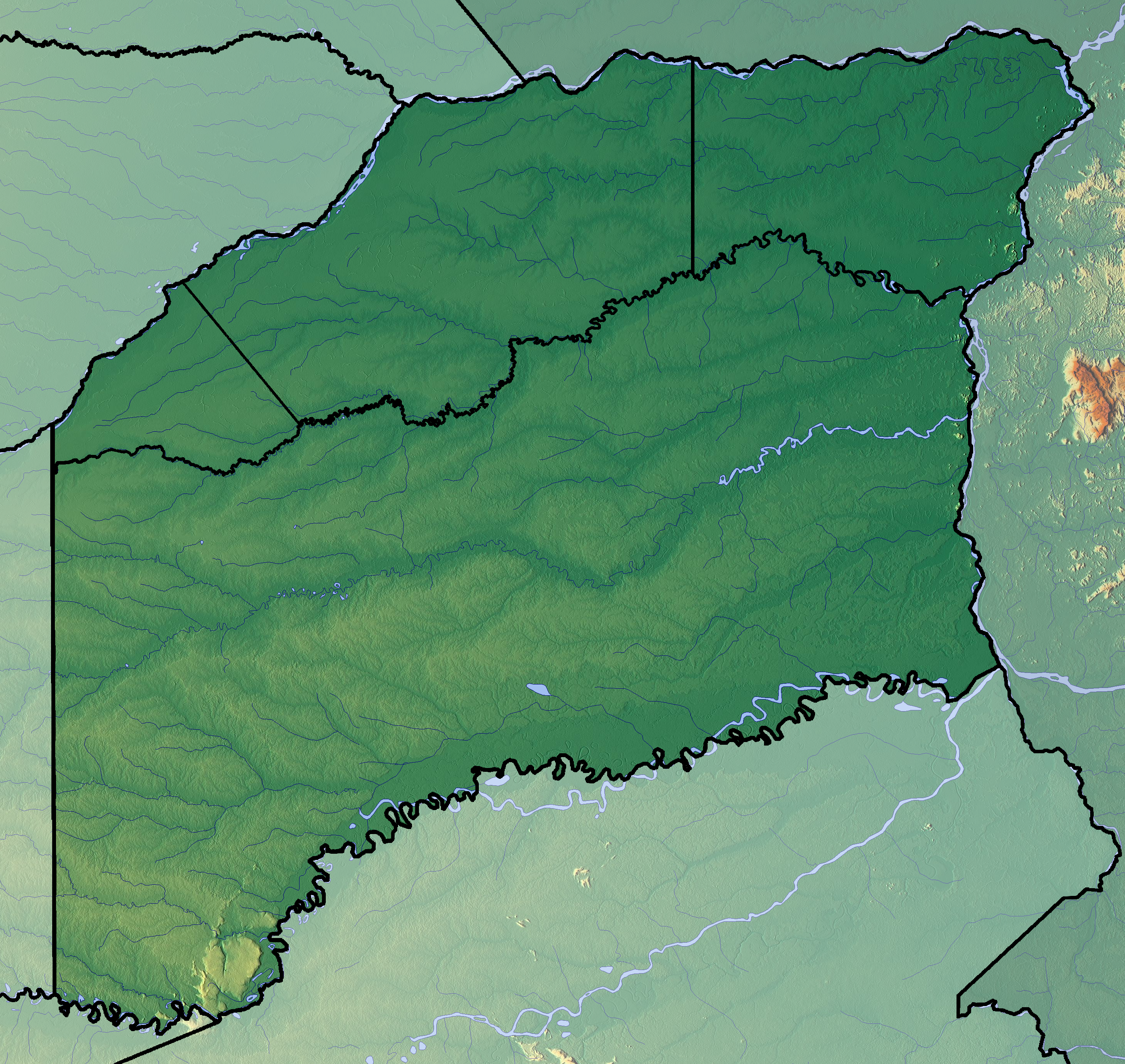
- Topography of the department
- Coordinates: 6°11′N 67°28′W
- Country: Colombia
- Region: Orinoquía Region
- Established: 5 July 1913
- Capital: Puerto Carreño

Government
  - Governor: Luis Carlos Alvarez Morales (2016-2019)

Area
  - Total: 100,242 km^{2} (38,704 sq mi)
  - Rank: 2nd

Population (2018)
  - Total: 107,808
  - Rank: 31st
  - Density: 1.07548/km^{2} (2.78547/sq mi)

GDP
  - Total: COP 957 billion (US$ 0.2 billion)
- Time zone: UTC-05
- ISO 3166 code: CO-VID
- Municipalities: 4
- HDI: 0.775 high · 15th of 33
- Website: www.gobvichada.gov.co

Vichada Department (Spanish: Departamento del Vichada, Spanish pronunciation: [biˈtʃaða]) is a department of the Republic of Colombia in South America. Vichada is located in the eastern plains of Colombia, in the Orinoquía Region within the Orinoco river basin bordering the Bolivarian Republic of Venezuela to the north and east. To the north the department also borders with Arauca Department, to the northwest with Casanare Department, to the west with Meta Department, to the southwest narrowly bordering with Guaviare Department and to the south with Guainía Department. The department is the second largest in Colombia and scarcely populated in comparison to other departments.

The department was previously a commissary established in 1913.

The largest town and capital of the department is Puerto Carreño located in extreme northeastern part of the department and bordering Venezuela. the department is subdivided into four municipalities; Puerto Carreño, La Primavera, Santa Rosalía and Cumaribo. It also contains 46 indigenous reserves and 6 communities.

== Geography ==
Historical population
Year	Pop.	±%
1973	12,215	—
1985	18,702	+53.1%
1993	62,073	+231.9%
2005	55,872	−10.0%
2018	107,808	+93.0%

The department is located on the eastern plains of Colombia known as the Llanos. The department limits to the north with the Arauca Department and the Bolivarian Republic of Venezuela; to the east with Venezuela; to the south with the Guainía Department and Guaviare Department; and to the west with Meta Department and Casanare Department.

The department is located to the left margin of the Orinoco river and the right margin of the Meta River within the plains of los Llanos. Part of the department lies on the Guiana Shield. Soil lacks sediments due to the lack of alluvions from rivers coming from the Andes mountains.

Climate in the department is predominantly hot and humid with an average temperature of 28 °C (82 °F) throughout the year.

The department also contains a major impact crater, the Vichada Structure.

== History ==
In 1913 the government of Colombia created the commissary of Vichada and the capital was established in a locality known as El Picacho between the Meta and Orinoco rivers. The town was named Puerto Carreño in honor of Pedro María Carreño, then acting Minister of Government.

In August 1974, Puerto Carreño was elevated to the category of municipality by decree 1594 of that same year.

On 5 July 1991 Vichada was elevated to the category of department and Puerto Carreño as its capital.

=== Municipalities ===
Political division, municipalities of Vichada

1. Cumaribo
2. La Primavera
3. Puerto Carreño
4. Santa Rosalía
5. San José de Ocune
