= Orinoquía natural region =

Natural region of Colombia that belongs to the Orinoco River watershed

Orinoquía region

Ecology
- Realm: Neotropic
- Biome: Savanna, Wetlands

Geography
- Country: Colombia
- Rivers: Guaviare, Meta, Arauca
- Climate type: Tropical

The Orinoquía region is one of the six natural regions of Colombia that belongs to the Orinoco River watershed. It is also known colloquially as the Eastern Plains (Llanos Orientales). The region covers most of the area of the departments of Arauca, Casanare, Meta, and Vichada and small parts of the Boyacá, Norte de Santander, and Cundinamarca departments.

== Biogeographical subregion ==
The Orinoquía region has the following subregions:

- Plains Foothills: in between the East Andes and the Eastern Plains; elevations ranges between 500 m (1,600 ft) and 700 m (2,300 ft); mostly covered by dense tropical humid forest
- Meta River Plain
- Arauca Marshlands
- Serranía de la Macarena

== Biodiversity ==
The ecosystems of the region are tropical savanna with gallery forests and wetlands along the rivers.

Map of the national parks within the Orinoquía region

== Protected areas ==
- PNN Serranía de la Macarena
- PNN El Tuparro
- PNN Morichales de Paz de Ariporo

== See also ==
- Llanos, vast plain situated to the east of the Andes in Colombia and Venezuela.
