= Meta River =

Tributary of the Orinoco in the Llanos of central Colombia

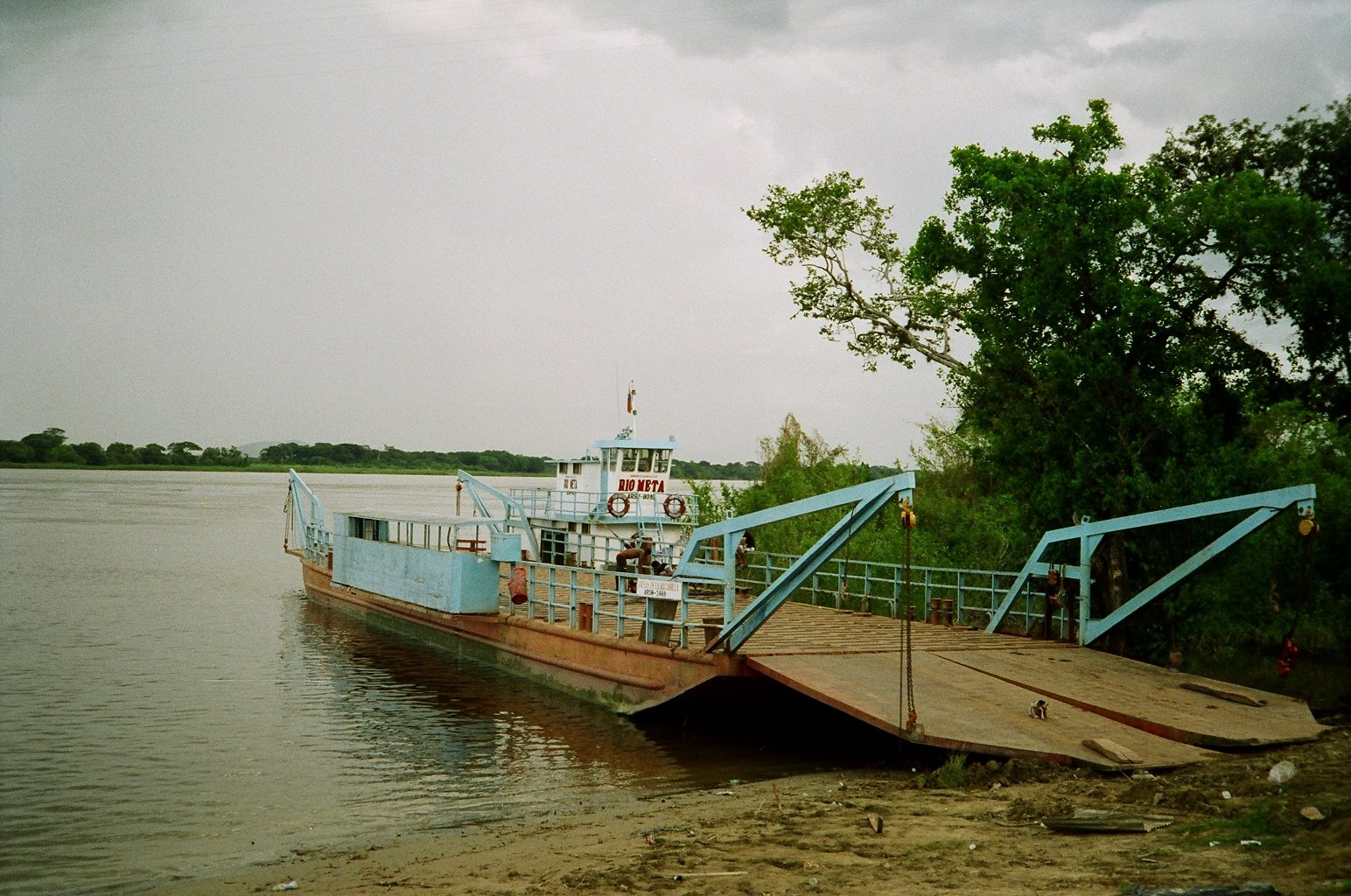
- Ferry over the Rio Meta on the road from Puerto Ayacucho to San Fernando de Apure in Venezuela

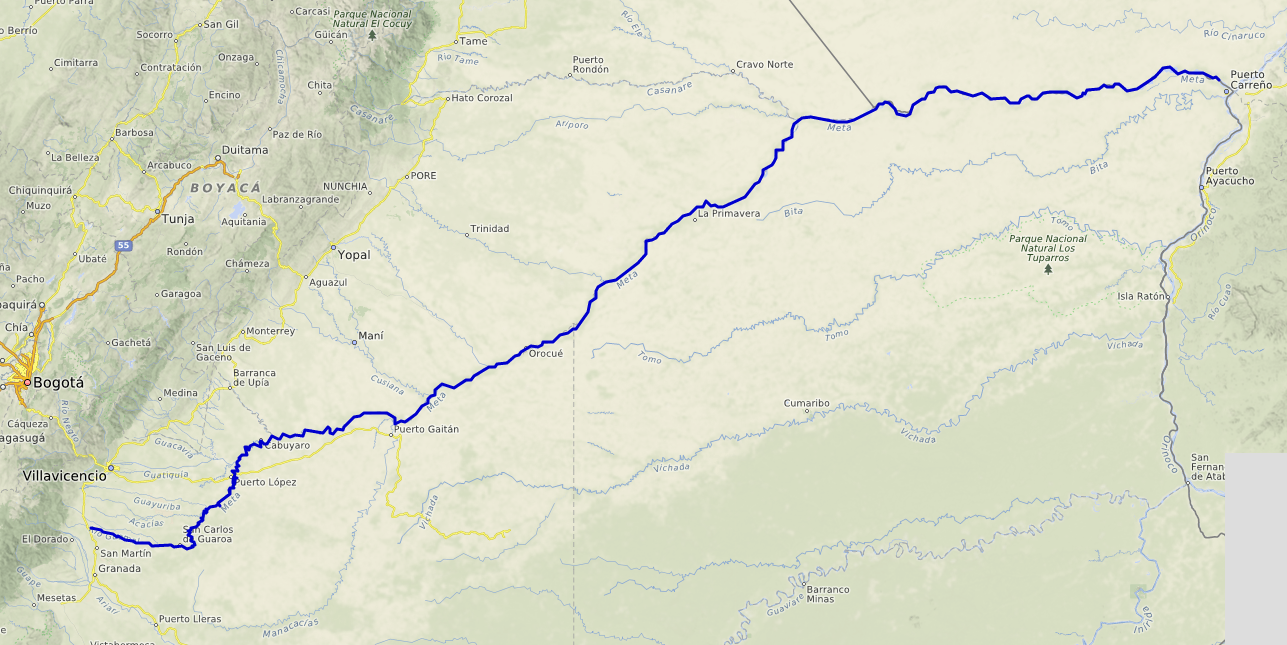
- Course of the Río Meta.

- Location within Colombia Location within Venezuela

Location
- Country: Colombia; Venezuela

Physical characteristics
- Source
  - location: Colombia
  - elevation: c. 1,300 m (4,300 ft)
- Mouth
  - location: Orinoco at Puerto Carreño
  - coordinates: 6.19517°N 67.4564°W
- Length: 1,100 km (680 mi)
- Basin size: 103,000 km^{2} (40,000 mi^{2}) to 106,733 km^{2} (41,210 mi^{2})
- Discharge
  - average: (Period of data: 1926-2011)5,694 m^{3}/s (201,100 cu ft/s) to 5,899 m^{3}/s (208,300 cu ft/s)

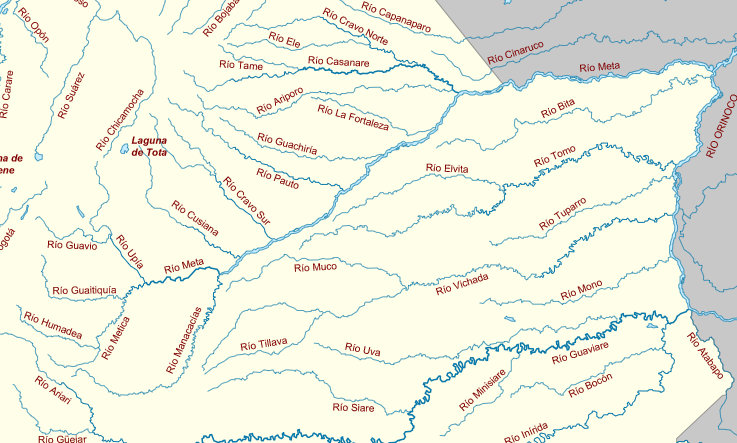
The Meta River and its tributaries

The Meta River is a major left tributary of the Orinoco River in eastern Colombia and southern Venezuela, South America. The Meta originates in the Eastern Ranges of the Andes and flows through the Meta Department, Colombia as the confluence of the Humea, Guatiquía and Guayuriba rivers. It flows east-northeastward across the Llanos Orientales ("Eastern Plains") of Colombia following the direction of the Meta Fault. The Meta forms the northern boundary of Vichada Department, first with Casanare Department, then with Arauca Department, and finally with Venezuela, down to Puerto Carreño where it flows into the Orinoco.

The Meta River is 1,100 km (680 mi) long and its drainage basin is 103,000 km^{2} (40,000 mi^{2}). The Meta divides the Colombian Llanos in two different parts: the western portion on the left bank is more humid, receives the relatively nutrient-rich sediments from the Andean mountain range and therefore soils and tributaries are also nutrient-rich, while the eastern portion, high plain or altillanura, drains not to the Meta river but to the Orinoco, has a longer dry season and soils and surface waters are oligotrophic (nutrient poor).

The major tributaries of the Meta are the Cravo Sur, the Casanare, the Cusiana, the Upía and the Manacacías rivers.

== History ==
In 1531, while exploring the Orinoco River, Diego de Ordáz became the first European to discover the estuarine delta of the Meta. Following indications of a gold country at the headwaters of the river – the "Meta Province" – he and his companions navigated the Meta upstream for 50 days until, due to the seasonally low water level, they could make no further progress and had to turn back without having achieved anything. The first Europeans to reach the headwaters of the Meta at the foot of the Eastern Cordillera were the participants of an expedition led by the conquistador Georg Hohermuth von Speyer in 1536.

In January 1824, the European scientific mission recruited for Gran Colombia's mining school and natural history museum traveled from Bogotá to the Meta and followed it to the Orinoco. Its members recorded the dwellings, animals, and produce of the region and the vocabularies of several indigenous groups, and observed the preparation of curare and the extraction of oil from turtle eggs. Among the party was the Peruvian mineralogist Mariano Eduardo de Rivero y Ustáriz, whose account of the two-month journey, Itinerario de los Llanos de San Martín y del río Meta, was published in 1857.

An 1856 watercolor by Manuel María Paz, of three indigenous people with a boat at Orocué, near the Old Macuco Mission, is an early depiction of life on the river.

== Indigenous groups ==
Living along the Meta are various indigenous groups. In the upper part of the river, close to the foothills of the Eastern Ranges and farther downstream, the Guayupe, Achagua, Sáliva and Guahibo people are living.

== Economy ==
Starting at Puerto López the Meta becomes navigable, and thus is an important component of the trade across the Colombian and Venezuelan Llanos.
