= Aerosucre =

Cargo airline of Colombia

Aerosucre S.A.

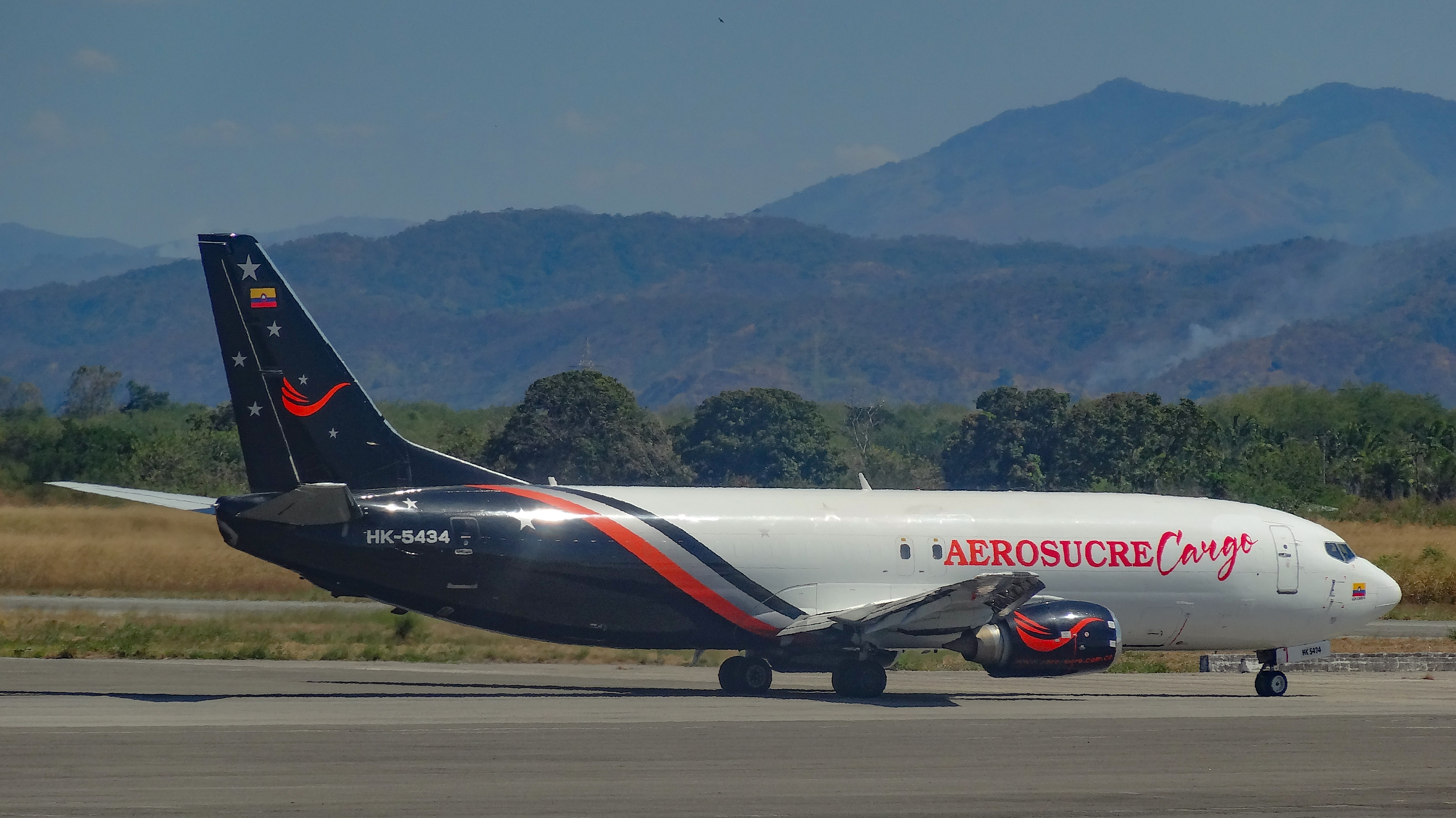
- Aerosucre Boeing 737-400SF
IATA	ICAO	Call sign
A4	KRE	AEROSUCRE
- Founded: 1969; 57 years ago
- Hubs: El Dorado International Airport
- Fleet size: 6
- Destinations: 20
- Headquarters: Bogotá, Colombia
- Employees: 200-501
- Website: aerosucre.com.co

Aerosucre S.A. is a cargo airline based in Bogotá, Colombia. It began operation in 1969 and operates scheduled international and domestic cargo services throughout Latin America and the Caribbean. Its home base is El Dorado International Airport, Bogotá. Aerosucre has been involved in a number of accidents and incidents during its lifetime, and more recently, internet videos have emerged showcasing reckless behavior by its pilots.

== History ==
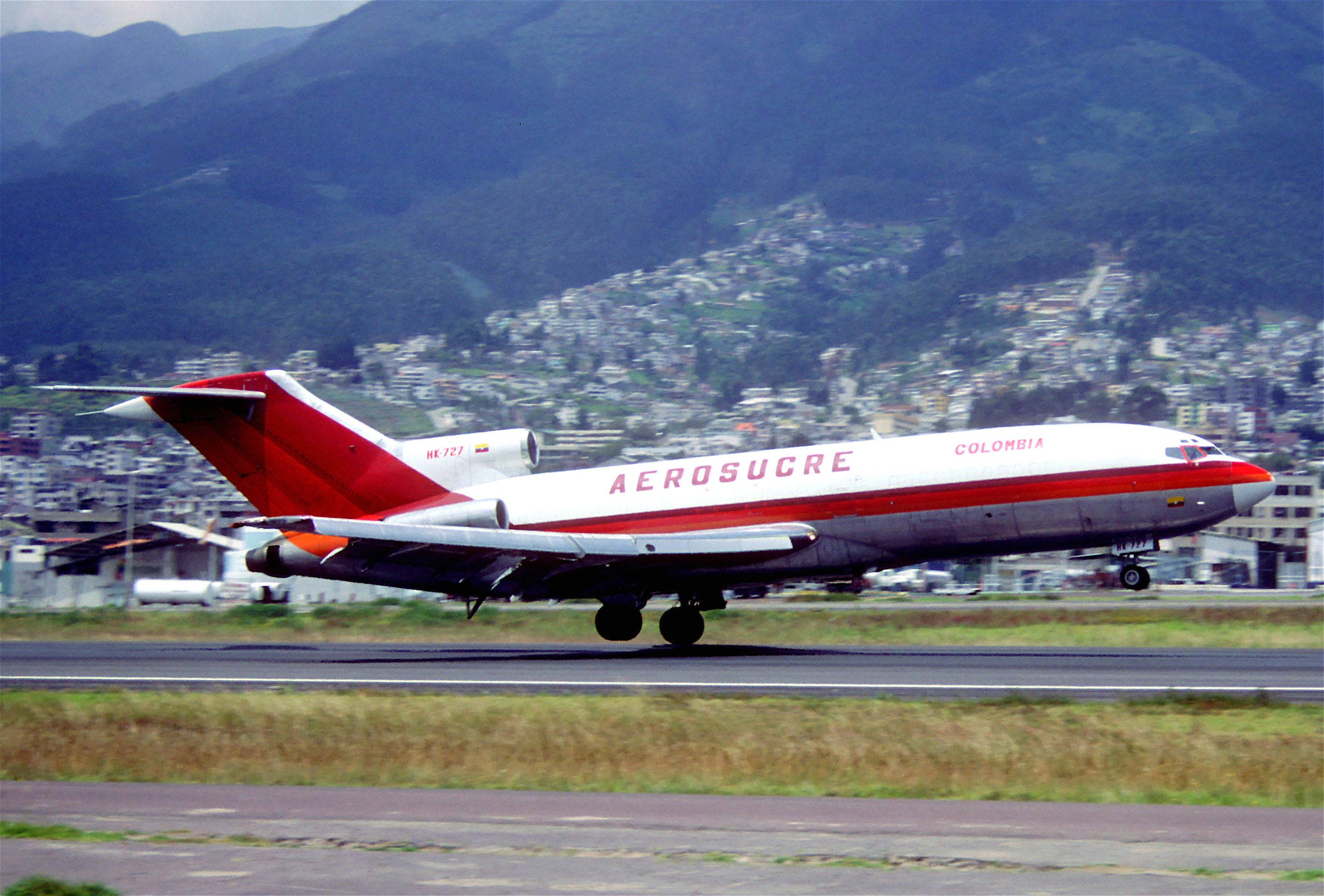
A Boeing 727-100 of Aerosucre's former fleet landing at Old Mariscal Sucre International Airport in 2002

Aerosucre was founded by Juan Carlos Solano Recio in Barranquilla in 1969, and began flight operations as an air taxi company in the spring of 1970, with a Piper PA-28.

By the spring of 1975, the company was focused primarily on freight transport, although it was still allowed to carry a maximum of five passengers on the flights. Initially, the company flew to the Colombian island of San Andrés and internationally to the islands of Aruba and Curaçao.

In 1981, Aerosucre acquired two Handley Page Heralds from British Air Ferries. Its first jet aircraft, a Sud Aviation Caravelle, was purchased in August 1982, from Spanish company Transeuropa.

On 5 March 1996, 150 kg (330 lb) of cocaine paste was discovered on an Aerosucre airplane in Leticia, Colombia, concealed among 21 t (21 long tons; 23 short tons) of fish.

In 2019 the airline turned 50 years old.

In 2020, the company participated in the transportation of medical supplies throughout Colombia in support of the medical response to the COVID-19 pandemic.

In 2025, the airline began speeding up the retirement of the Boeing 727-200. On December 18, 2025, the airline was reported to have retired two of its Boeing 737-200s and one was inactive. The accident of HK-5216 caused the airline to retire the Boeing 727.

== Destinations ==
As per the airline's website:

Country	City	Airport	Notes
Aruba	Oranjestad	Queen Beatrix International Airport	Focus city
Colombia	Barranquilla	Ernesto Cortissoz International Airport	Focus city
Colombia	Bogotá	El Dorado International Airport	Hub
Colombia	Cali	Alfonso Bonilla Aragón International Airport	Focus city
Colombia	Cartagena	Rafael Núñez International Airport	
Colombia	Inírida	César Gaviria Trujillo Airport	
Colombia	Leticia	Alfredo Vásquez Cobo International Airport	
Colombia	Medellín	José María Córdova International Airport	Focus city
Colombia	Mitú	Fabio Alberto León Bentley Airport	
Colombia	Puerto Carreño	Germán Olano Airport	
Colombia	San Andrés	Gustavo Rojas Pinilla International Airport	Focus city
Curaçao	Willemstad	Curaçao International Airport	
Dominican Republic	Santo Domingo	Las Américas International Airport	
Ecuador	Quito	Mariscal Sucre International Airport	
El Salvador	San Salvador	El Salvador International Airport	
Guatemala	Guatemala City	La Aurora International Airport	
Panama	Panama City	Tocumen International Airport	
Venezuela	Caracas	Simón Bolívar International Airport	
Venezuela	Maracaibo	La Chinita International Airport	

== Fleet ==
As of July 2026, Aerosucre operates the following aircraft:

Aircraft	In service	Orders	Notes
Boeing 737-300F	2	—	
Boeing 737-400F	1	—	
Boeing 737-400SF	3	—	
Total	6	—	

== Safety ==
The safety culture at Aerosucre has been called into question by airline industry analysts following a number of accidents and incidents involving the airline, along with videos that have appeared on the internet that showcase reckless behavior by Aerosucre pilots. In 1995, the company was cited by the Colombian government for flying at weights above their planes' specified maximum takeoff weights, and in 2005, inspectors found two planes flying while more than 4 metric tons (3.9 long tons; 4.4 short tons) overweight. Excess weight was also cited as a factor in the fatal crash of Aerosucre Flight 157 in 2016. Aerosucre has had a history of transporting passengers despite being unauthorized to do so by the Colombian government. Following a 20 June 1991 crash that killed two, passengers reported that they had been forced to lie down on the floor of the plane because the aircraft had no seats.

== Accidents and incidents ==
Aerosucre has been the site of many aviation incidents and accidents:

- On 16 September 1976, a Curtiss C-46 Commando (registered HK-1282) disappeared without a trace on a cargo flight from Barranquilla to Oranjestad. Two crew members were on board.
- On 13 March 1984, during an apparently illegal flight, a Curtiss C-46 Commando (registered HK-1322P) was forced by air traffic control to return to Barranquilla. The plane crashed upon landing, killing four of the six occupants aboard.
- On 27 November 1986, a Sud Aviation Caravelle (registered HK-2850) aborted takeoff from Arauca, Colombia, due to control problems. The aircraft overran the runway and crashed into a ditch. No deaths resulted, although the plane was written off.
- On 26 April 1989, a Sud Aviation Caravelle (registered HK-3325X) crashed into an inhabited area shortly after taking off from Barranquilla. All five crew members were killed, along with two people on the ground. The cause was poorly secured cargo, which shifted during takeoff, causing the aircraft to stall.
- On 5 November 1989, a Handley Page Herald 401 (registered HK-2702) en route from Bogotá to Cali crashed into a mountain near the town of Roncesvalles, Tolima, during poor weather. All six occupants were killed.
- On 20 June 1991, a Douglas DC-6B (registered HK-3511X) crashed on its second attempt at landing at Barranquilla, killing two and injuring 20 of the 25 passengers on board.
- On 29 September 1991, a Sud Aviation Caravelle (registered HK-3288X) had its landing gear fail during takeoff, causing it to veer off the runway. All crew members and occupants survived.
- On 1 May 1995, a Boeing 727-100 (registered HK-1717) descended below the glide slope on approach to Taguatinga Airport, Brazil, touching down 6 m (20 ft) before the runway threshold.
- On 25 June 1997, the same aircraft, HK-1717, crossed the threshold of runway 31 at El Dorado International Airport in Bogotá, after having aborted takeoff. All occupants were unharmed, but the aircraft was declared a total loss and later scrapped.
- On 17 August 2006, a Boeing 727-200 (registered HK-3985) suffered a landing-gear failure during taxi at El Dorado International Airport in Bogotá, resulting in damage to its left wing. The aircraft was declared a total loss and was scrapped.
- On 18 November 2006, a Boeing 727-200 (registered HK-3667X) on a cargo flight from Bogotá to Leticia crashed on approach to Leticia when it hit a 46 m (150 ft) television antenna. The three crew members and two passengers were killed,
- On 20 December 2016, Aerosucre Flight 157, a Boeing 727-200 (registered HK-4544) crashed after takeoff from Germán Olano Airport in Puerto Carreño. The aircraft overran the runway, crashed through a fence, crossed a road - where the aircraft nearly struck several civilians - and eventually became airborne, but lost altitude and crashed while attempting to return for an emergency landing. Five crew members died; one crew member survived, but suffered severe injuries.
- On 21 August 2021, a Boeing 737-230 (registered HK-5026) had to make an emergency landing back to Mitú, since the cargo door had opened in flight after taking off from Mitú.
- On 10 November 2024, a Boeing 727-200(F) (registered HK-5216) en route to Valencia, Venezuela, experienced a serious incident after it clipped a localizer array on departure from runway 14L at El Dorado International Airport in Bogotá, Colombia. The aircraft returned to the airport approximately one hour later, landing on runway 14R without further incident.
- On 12 December 2025, the same aircraft, a Boeing 727-200(F) (registered HK-5216) on a flight from Barranquilla to Bogota, returned to Barranquilla due to a problem with the left main gear. The plane touched down with the left wing on the runway and suffered substantial damage to the left wing.Following this, all 727s were retired from Aerosucre.

== See also ==
- List of airlines of Colombia
