= SKPC =

SKPC may refer to:

- Germán Olano Airport or Puerto Carreño Airport, Vichada department, Colombia
- Provincial Court of Saskatchewan
