= Flight 157 =

Flight 157 may refer to:

Listed chronologically

- American Airlines Flight 157, crashed on 29 November 1949
- Aerosucre Flight 157, crashed on 20 December 2016
