= Air Moorea =

Airline in French Polynesia

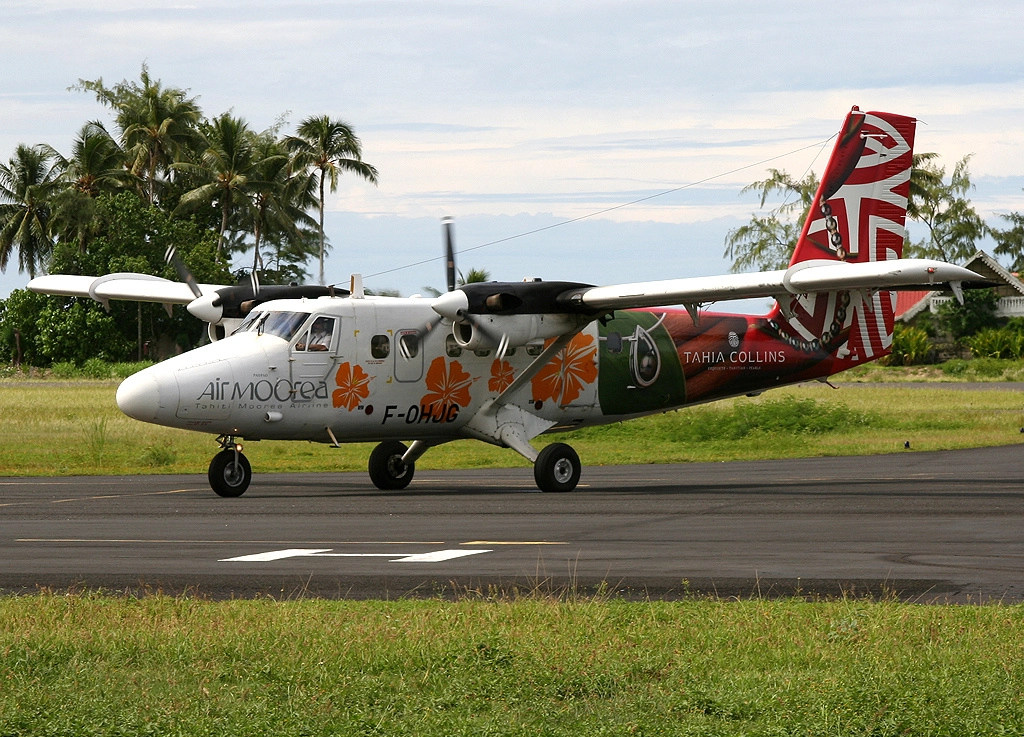
IATA	ICAO	Call sign
QE	TAH	AIR MOOREA
- Founded: 1968
- Ceased operations: 2010
- Hubs: Faa'a International Airport
- Focus cities: Mo'orea
- Headquarters: Faaa, Tahiti, French Polynesia, France
- Website: http://www.airmoorea.pf

Air Moorea was a French airline based on the grounds of Faa'a International Airport in Faaa, Tahiti, French Polynesia, France near Papeete. It operated passenger services within the Polynesian islands. Its main base was Faa'a International Airport.

== History ==
The airline started operations in September 1968, and was wholly owned by Air Tahiti.

Air Moorea mainly flew short inter-island services, especially the link between Tahiti and Moorea, which was among the busiest routes in French Polynesia. The company first used small Britten-Norman Islander and Piper Aztec, later replacing them with DHC-6 Twin Otters that handled several daily rotations on the route.

Air Moorea ceased all operations on 1 November 2010. The decision followed financial losses and restructuring within its parent company Air Tahiti, compounded by the reputational and legal aftermath of the 2007 crash of Air Moorea Flight 1121.

== Fleet ==
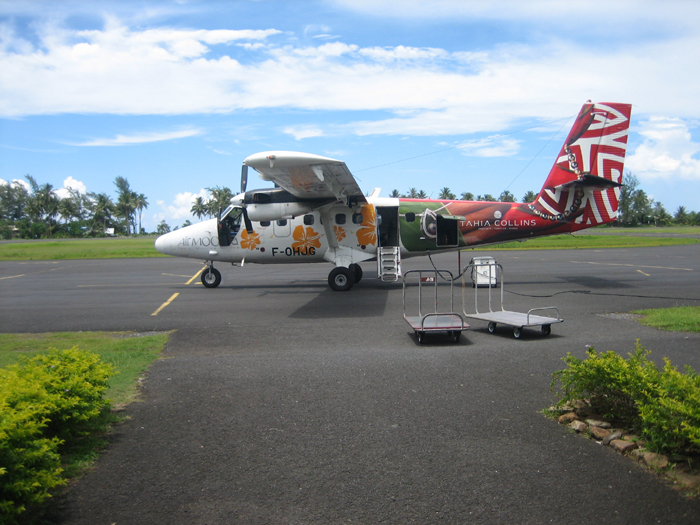
An Air Moorea Twin Otter in Tahia Collins livery

The Air Moorea fleet includes the following aircraft (at March 2007):

- 3 De Havilland Canada DHC-6 Twin Otter Series 300
- On order: 2 Viking DHC-6 Twin Otter Series 400

== Accidents and incidents ==
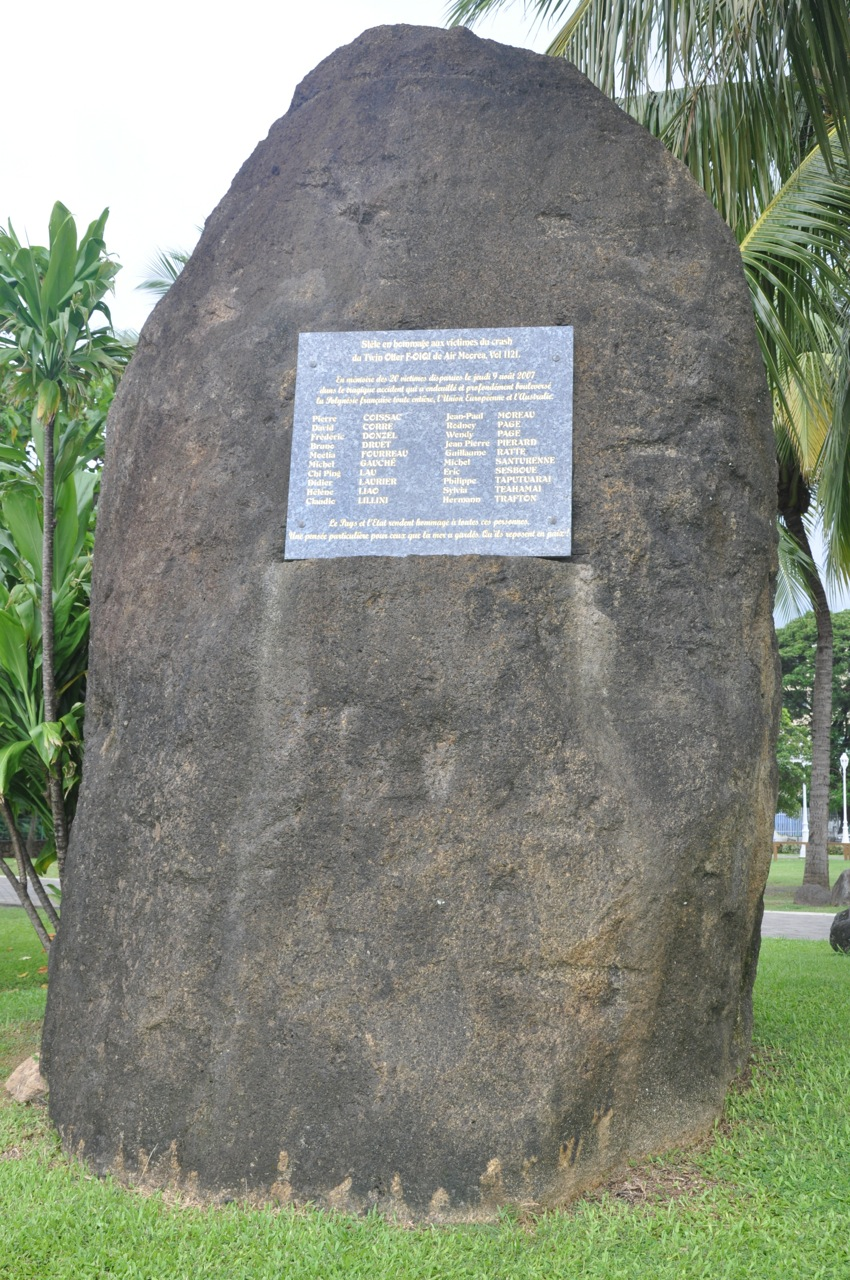
The memorial of the aircraft with occupants name

On 9 August 2007, Air Moorea Flight 1121 with 19 passengers and one pilot on board crashed into the lagoon about a minute after takeoff from Moorea Airport (Temae Airport) on the French Polynesian island of Moorea, with the loss of 20 lives. The flight was heading for the Tahiti, Faa'a International Airport.

The airline stated that this was its first crash in its 39-year history.
