= Vita River =

River in Colombia

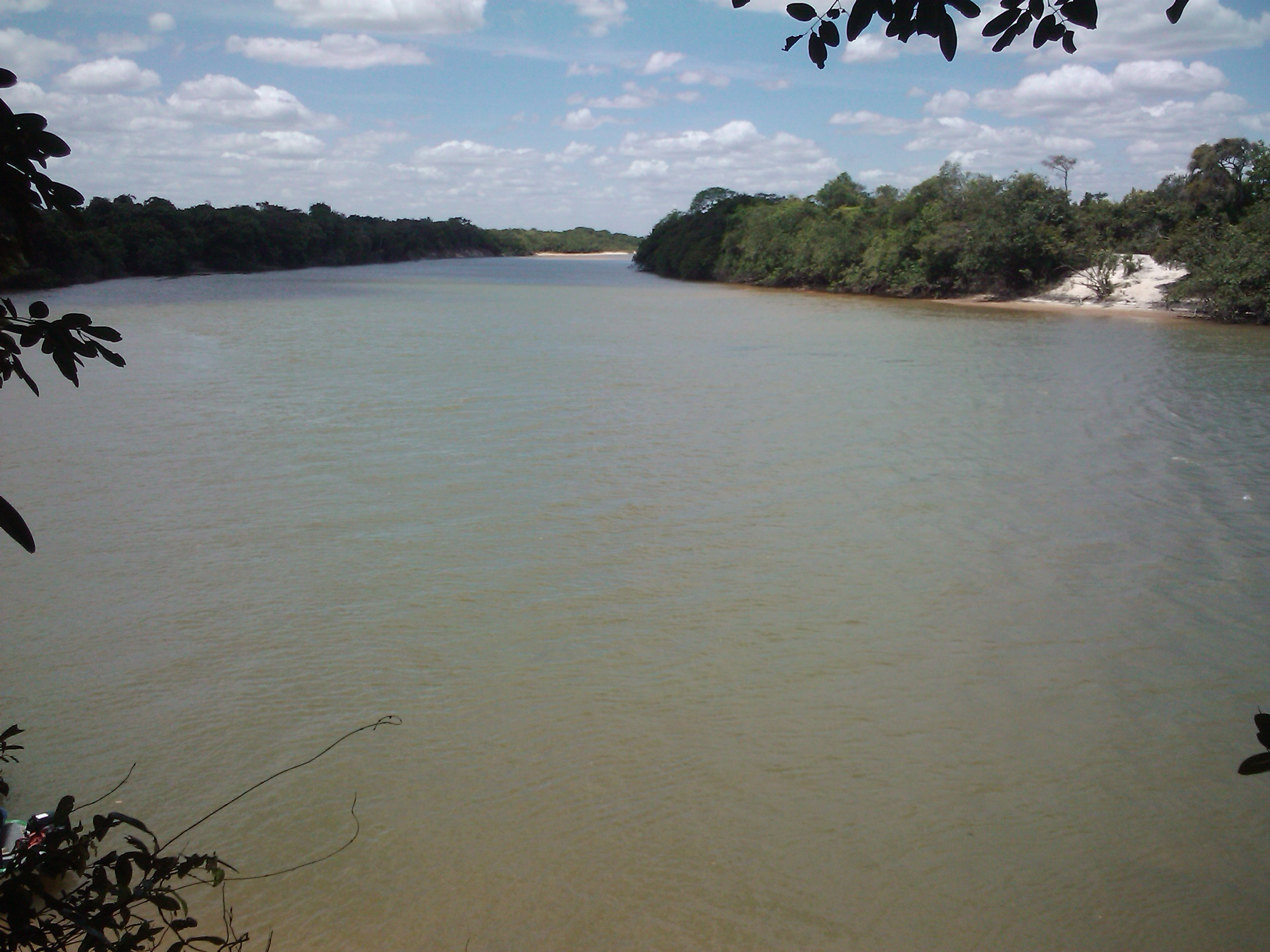

Location
- Country: Colombia

The Vita River or Bita River (Spanish:Río Bita) is a river in Colombia, a tributary of the Orinoco. In 2018 its whole river basin was declared a wetland of international significance under the Ramsar Convention, the largest Ramsar site in Colombia and the first in the world to cover a whole river basin.

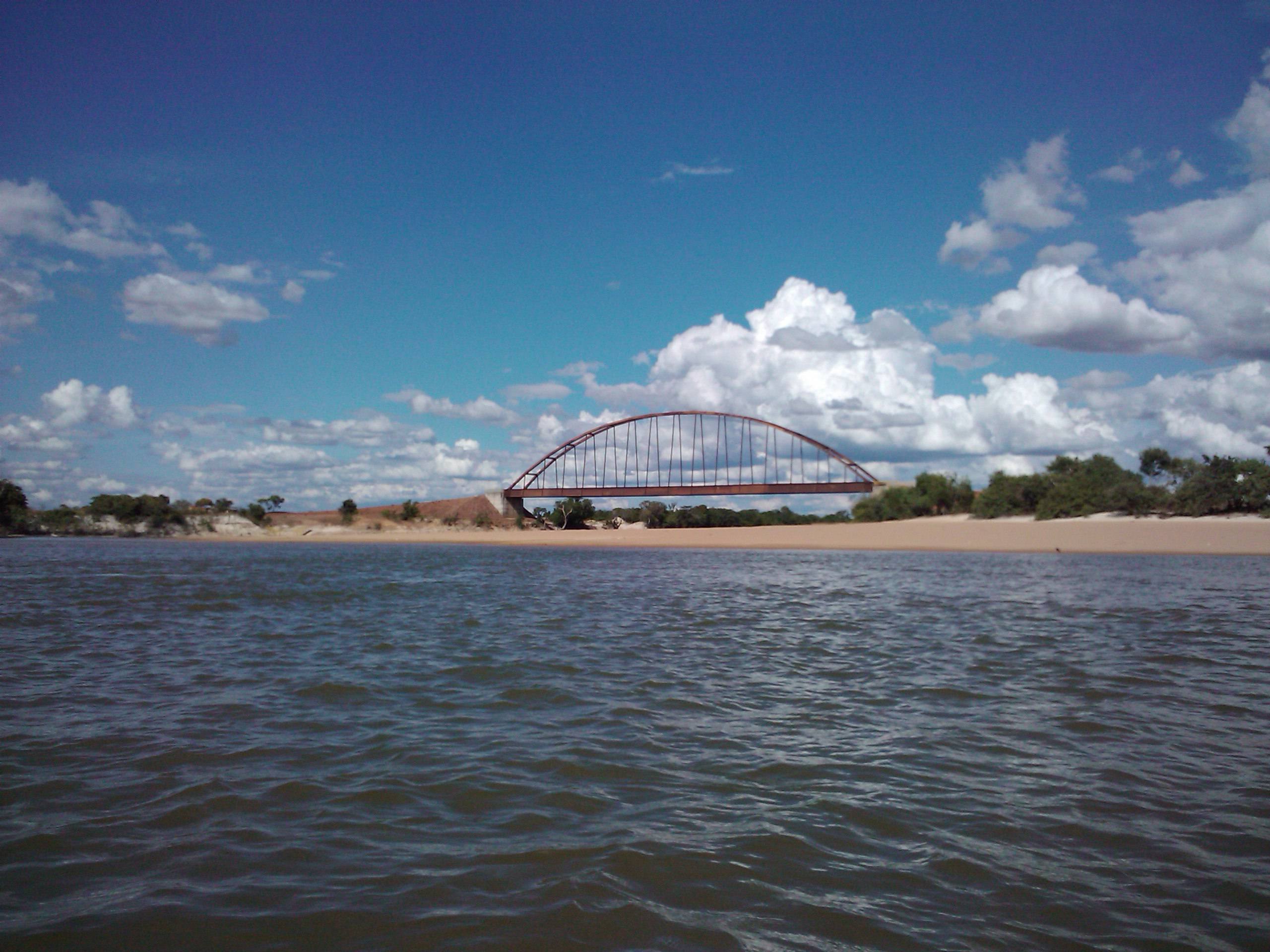
Bridge at the mouth of the Vita River

== Geography ==
The Vita River is 520 km (320 mi) in length, it rises as a stream originating in spring in the middle of the Colombian Llanos, near to the town of La Primavera in the Department of Vichada. It then has a meandering couse through the Llanos, creating lagoons and beaches, until it joins the Orinoco, close to Puerto Carreño. The Bita is relatively untouched by humans and there are no artificial obstructions hindering the natural flow of the river. The area protected under the Ramsar designation is more than 824,000 ha (2,040,000 acres), the largest of Colombia's eleven Ramsar sites.

== Flora and fauna ==
The Vita River draiange supports many vegetation types, examples in clude savanna, gallery forest and groves of moriche palm (Mauritia flexuosa), known as morichales. The area supports populations of large mammals including South American tapirs (Tapirus terrestris), jaguar (Panthera onca) and puma (Puma concolor), there are also giant otters (Pteronura brasiliensis). The river is important for populations of river dolphin (Inia geoffrensis), as well as peacock bass, freshwater stingrays and turtles. Overall the Ramsar site has recorded 1,474 species of plants, 254 species of fishes, 201 bird species, 30 amphibians and 63 mammals.

== See also ==
- List of rivers of Colombia
