= Eastern Air Lines Flight 935 =

1981 aviation incident

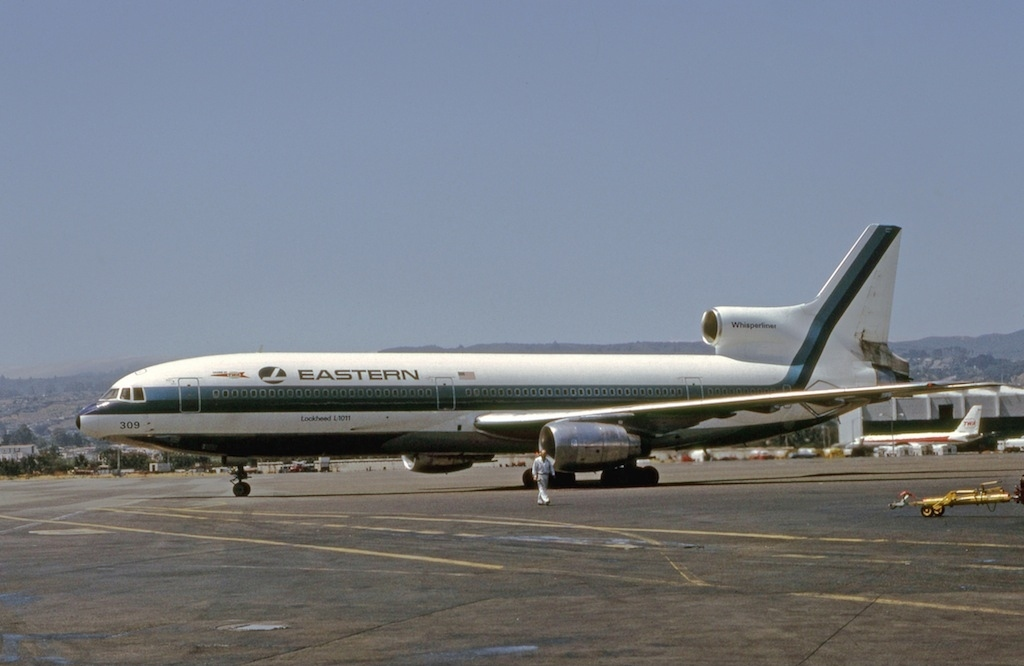
- N309EA, the aircraft involved, photographed in June 1973

Accident
- Date: September 22, 1981
- Summary: Uncontained engine failure resulting in major loss of hydraulics
- Site: John F. Kennedy International Airport, New York City, United States; 40°11′N 74°10′W

Aircraft
- Aircraft type: Lockheed L-1011-385-1 TriStar
- Operator: Eastern Air Lines
- Registration: N309EA
- Flight origin: Newark Liberty International Airport, Newark, New Jersey, United States
- Destination: Luis Muñoz Marín International Airport, San Juan, Puerto Rico
- Occupants: 201
- Passengers: 190
- Crew: 11
- Fatalities: 0
- Injuries: 0
- Survivors: 201

Eastern Air Lines Flight 935 was a scheduled commercial passenger flight operated by Eastern Air Lines. On September 22, 1981, the Lockheed L-1011 TriStar jet operating the flight suffered an uncontained engine failure which led to a loss of 3 out of the 4 hydraulic systems aboard the aircraft at an altitude of 10,000 feet (3,000 m) MSL. The crew were able to land the aircraft safely for an emergency landing at John F. Kennedy International Airport with some limited use of the outboard spoilers, the inboard ailerons and the horizontal stabilizer, plus differential engine power of the remaining two engines. There were no injuries.

== Aircraft ==
The plane was a Lockheed L-1011 Tristar, registration N309EA, C/n / msn: 1010, fitted with Rolls-Royce RB211-22B turbofan engines, delivered in July 1972. In April 1973 and 1974, the plane was leased to Trans World Airlines under the same registration.

== Accident ==
On September 22: 1981, Eastern Airlines Flight 935 was being operated as an international scheduled passenger flight from Newark Liberty International Airport, Newark, New Jersey, to Luis Muñoz Marín International, San Juan, Puerto Rico. The aircraft departed from Newark international airport at 11:25am using a reduced thrust take-off power setting. The initial climb and take-off were normal with the exception of a brief illumination of the No. 2 engine fan airborne vibration motor (AVM) warning light at 800 feet, this indicated an abnormal level of vibration, it extinguished quickly and did not reappear. Through the use of the broad band vibrator filter selector, the flight engineer observed that while the No. 2 engine N₁ and N₃ readings were within limits, the N₂ rotor reading was very high. Shortly after, the engine oil filter pressure warning light, which measures pressure differential across the filter, became illuminated. This indicated that the filter could be blocked or operating in bypass mode. The flight crew slowly lowered the throttle for engine No. 2 to idle, and the oil quantity and pressure readings were both within normal limits.

At 2,000 feet, all engine parameters were normal, including the AVM reading; the crew reestablished power in their climb while monitoring their engine instruments closely. As the aircraft climbed through 10,000 feet the crew reported hearing and feeling a large explosion; this was accompanied by heavy aircraft buffeting. Following this, many warning and caution lights illuminated in the cockpit. The second officer alerted the pilot to the fact that the No. 2 engine had failed and that hydraulic systems A, B, and D had all been lost at once. The crew then requested clearance for an emergency descent and landing at John F. Kennedy International Airport, New York City, New York. The clearance was granted, and they began to jettison fuel to get to the optimal landing weight.

They landed the plane on runway 22L at 12:12pm; it was determined that there was no immediate danger and the pilot taxied normally to the gate.

== Aftermath ==
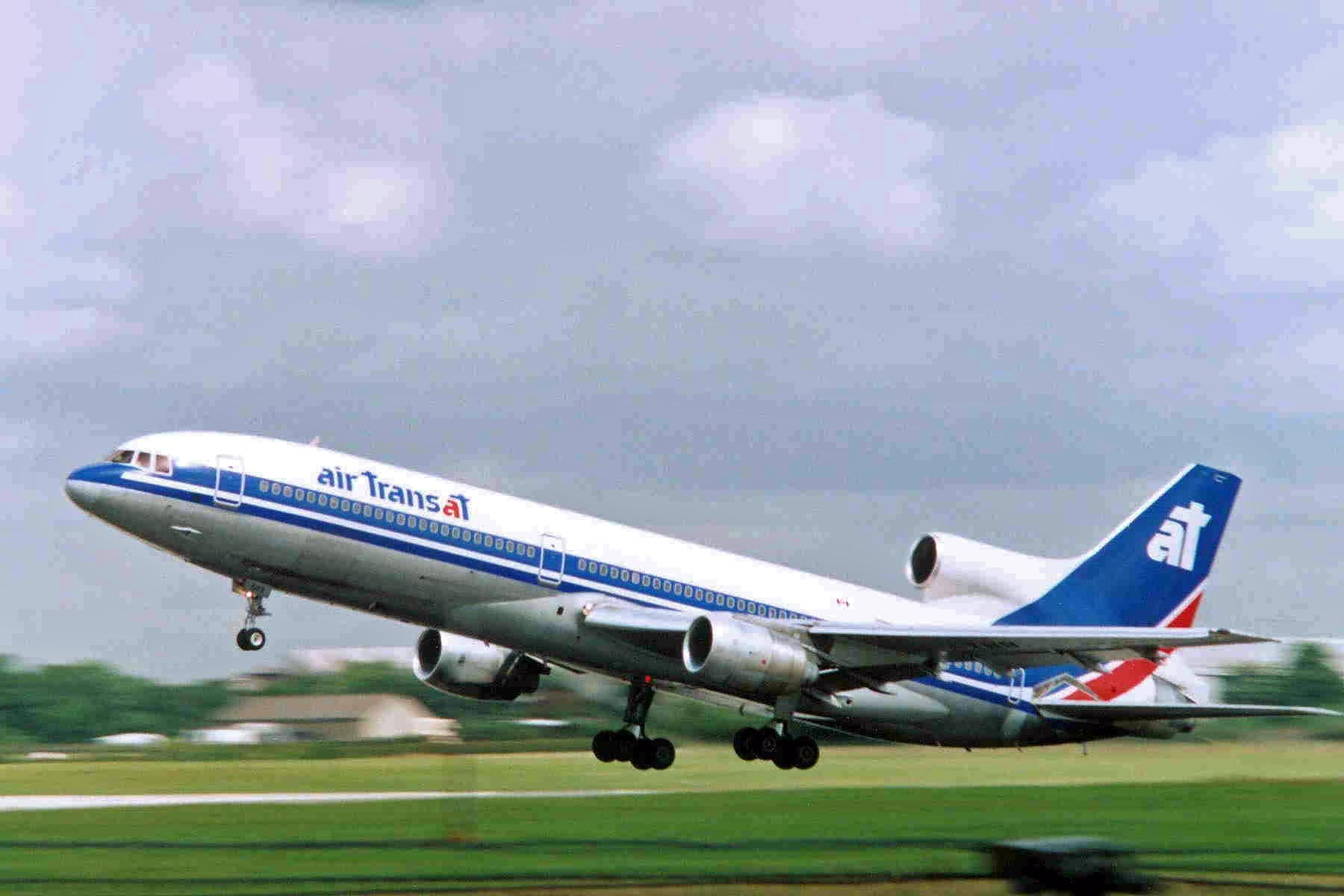
The aircraft involved in the incident, photographed in 1992 under new operator Air Transat

The aircraft, N309EA, was repaired and returned to service until it was retired in 1988. In 1989, the aircraft was sold to Air Transat and re-registered as C-FTNB. The aircraft was scrapped in 2001.

== See also ==
- United Airlines Flight 232
- Flight with disabled controls
