= Roncesvalles, Colombia =

Coordinates: 4°01′N 75°36′W

Roncesvalles, Tolima
- Municipality and town
- Flag Coat of arms

- Location of the municipality and town of Roncesvalles, Tolima in the Tolima Department of Colombia.
- Country: Colombia
- Department: Tolima Department

Government
  - mayor: José Manuel García Sánchez

Area
  - Total: 790 km^{2} (310 sq mi)
- Elevation: 2,640 m (8,660 ft)

Population (2017)
  - Total: 6,340
- Time zone: UTC-5 (Colombia Standard Time)

Roncesvalles is a municipality in the Tolima department of Colombia. The population of the municipality was 7,647 as of the 1993 census.
