= Air Moorea Flight 1121 =

2007 aviation accident in French Polynesia

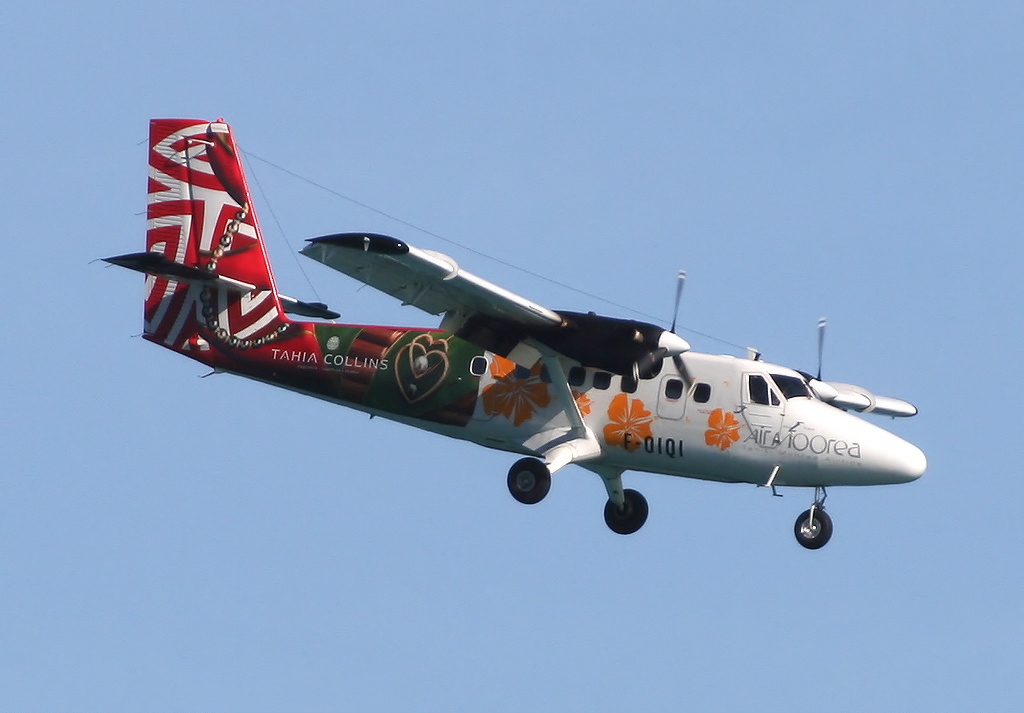
- F-OIQI, the aircraft involved in the accident, pictured in March 2007

Accident
- Date: 9 August 2007
- Summary: Loss of control due to deterioration and vertical stabilizer failure
- Site: 1.5 km (0.9 mi; 0.8 nmi) off Moorea-Temae Airport (MOZ), French Polynesia; 17°30′6″S 149°44′46″W

Aircraft
- Aircraft type: De Havilland Canada DHC-6 Twin Otter
- Operator: Air Moorea
- IATA flight No.: QE1121
- ICAO flight No.: TAH1121
- Call sign: AIR MOOREA 1121
- Registration: F-OIQI
- Flight origin: Moorea-Temae Airport, French Polynesia
- Destination: Faaʻa International Airport, French Polynesia
- Occupants: 20
- Passengers: 19
- Crew: 1
- Fatalities: 20
- Survivors: 0

Air Moorea Flight 1121 was a de Havilland Canada DHC-6 Twin Otter which crashed into the ocean shortly after takeoff from Moorea Airport on Moorea Island in French Polynesia on 9 August 2007 killing all 20 people on board.

It was bound for Tahiti's Faaʻa International Airport on a regular 7-minute service, one of the shortest in the world, scheduled 40 times a day. The crash resulted from loss of control due to failure of the airplane's elevator cable. Frequent takeoff and landing are believed to have been a major factor in the crash, because of wear and tear on the elevator cables, inspected only at fixed time intervals, regardless of usage. Another factor may have been jet-blast from large planes pushing back from the ramp at Fa'a'ā International.

== Background ==
The aircraft, registration F-OIQI, serial number 608, was a de Havilland Canada DHC-6-300 Twin Otter powered by two Pratt & Whitney Canada PT6A-27. As of 8 August 2007, the airframe had flown 55,044 cycles in approximately 30,834 hours. It was 28 years old at the time of the accident. The aircraft was operated by four other operators before being officially sold to Air Moorea on 17 November 2006. Although the French law did not require every Twin Otter to be fitted with flight recorders, Air Moorea had chosen to install a cockpit voice recorder (CVR) on this aircraft.

The only pilot flying was 53-year-old French Polynesian Michel Santeurenne. Air Moorea flights generally required only a single pilot, and on the day of the crash, Santeurenne was flying the short hop without any other crewmembers. He had completed approximately 3,515 hours of flight time on 8 August 2007, including 110 hours for Air Moorea since joining the airline on 14 May 2007, three months before the crash. He was previously employed by a French regional airline, Finist'air. On 14 May 2007, he began his Twin Otter in-flight training before obtaining his type rating on 18 May. He began working as a newly employed pilot for Air Moorea between 28 and 30 May 2007. He had spent most of the time being the captain of a flight during his career with Air Moorea.

== Flight and crash ==
The oft-traveled Moorea to Tahiti route is one of the shortest in the world – only a 7-minute flight on average – and is flown 40 times a day. On 9 August 2007, F-OIQI was the aircraft operating the short route as Flight QE 1121.

At 12:00:06 local time (22:00:06 UTC), the air traffic controller cleared the aircraft for takeoff, and six seconds later, the aircraft began its takeoff roll. As is normal procedure for takeoffs, the pilot retracted the aircraft’s flaps after climbing to a safe altitude, and shortly after reduced engine power as the aircraft approached its cruising altitude. The reduced thrust and flap retraction caused the aircraft to lose some of the extra takeoff lift, resulting in the nose tilting back downwards slightly, which the pilot attempted to counteract by pulling back on the control column to bring the nose back up. The force from this action caused the aircraft's damaged elevator pitch-up cable to fray and lengthen around 350 feet (110 m) above sea level, which allowed the elevators to droop downwards and resulting in its nose slowly pitching down toward the sea. At 12:01:09, the failing cable snapped completely, and the elevator fell into a permanent, full nose-down deflection, sending the aircraft into a catastrophic dive. The pilot expressed audible surprise followed by six GPWS warnings sounding together with the engine speed increasing higher than during the take off and climb. At 12:01:20 (22:01:20 UTC) the aircraft crashed into the sea at the descent rate of about 6,500 feet per minute (2,000 m/min), killing all 20 people on board – 19 passengers and the pilot, Santeurenne.

An eyewitness reported seeing the plane suddenly nose down about 30 seconds after takeoff. The aircraft seemed to attempt to recover from the nosedive, however it soon crashed into the sea.

== Recovery ==
Although some pieces of the aircraft were found floating on the sea surface, the majority of the wreckage was resting on the seabed, 600 to 700 metres (2,000 to 2,300 ft) below the sea surface. The recovery operations commenced on 26 August and ended on 3 September. The aircraft was found to have split into eight major portions. The tail section of the aircraft, including the cockpit voice recorder (CVR), was recovered on 30 August. On 30 August—1 September, the tail fin, including the control surfaces and the elevator control systems, the engines, and the cockpit were recovered. As of May 2013, some parts of the aircraft, such as the central part of the fuselage, left landing gear, and the wings, were found but not recovered. 15 bodies were recovered, however the bodies of 5 passengers had not been found yet.

== Investigation ==
As the islands are French territory, the accident was investigated by the Bureau of Enquiry and Analysis for Civil Aviation Safety (BEA). Following analysis of the CVR and metallurgical testing of the parts, the BEA concluded: "The accident was caused by the loss of airplane pitch control following the failure, at a low height, of the elevator pitch-up control cable at the time the flaps were retracted.

According to the accident investigation report, the elevator cable failure was primarily caused by two factors:

- Though more resistant to corrosion in the saline environment than the original carbon steel cables, the stainless steel cables that were present on this particular aircraft suffered greater wear from abrasion by the cable guides. There were no modifications made to the maintenance schedule to account for this added wear, nor the higher than usual number of cycles experienced by the aircraft on the high-frequency short flight it operated.
- Another possible factor contributing to the failure of the elevator cable was when the Twin Otter, while parked at Faa'a airport, was possibly subject to a jet blast from an Airbus A340. When the A340 was pushed back, it was brought close to where the Twin Otter was parked. As the A340 turned toward the runway, the jet blast from the A340's engines caused the Twin Otter's elevators to flutter, causing stress on the cable. This would have been exaggerated by the procedure of locking the elevator in the pitch-down position when parked, capturing more of the blast than it would in a neutral position.

== Cultural references ==
The Discovery Channel Canada / National Geographic TV series Mayday depicted the accident in a Season #13 episode, "Terror in Paradise", first aired on 27 Jan 2014. The episode featured interviews with witnesses and accident investigators, and a dramatization of the accident.

== See also ==
- 2008 Chelyabinsk Antonov An-12 crash
- Alaska Airlines Flight 261
- 1977 Dan-Air Boeing 707 crash
- Emery Worldwide Airlines Flight 17
- Continental Express Flight 2574
