= Aerosucre Flight 157 =

2016 aviation accident in Colombia

- The aircraft after overrunning the runway

Accident
- Date: 20 December 2016
- Summary: Crashed following runway overrun on takeoff and loss of control
- Site: Germán Olano Airport, Puerto Carreño, Colombia; 6°11′14.40″N 67°34′0.40″W

Aircraft
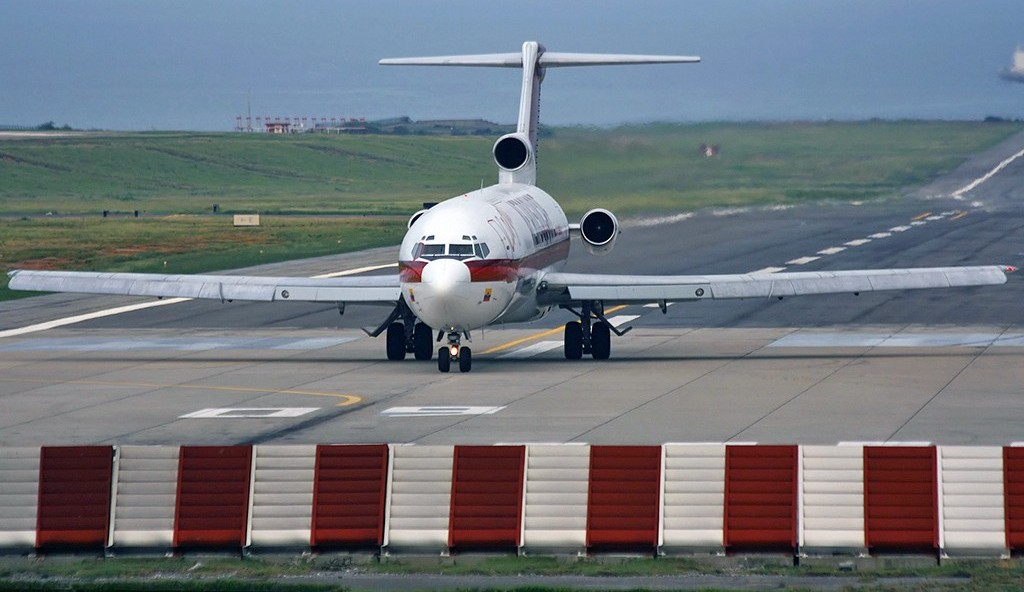
- HK-4544, the aircraft involved in the accident, pictured in 2008
- Aircraft type: Boeing 727-2J0F
- Operator: Aerosucre
- IATA flight No.: 6C157
- ICAO flight No.: KRE157
- Call sign: AEROSUCRE 157
- Registration: HK-4544
- Flight origin: Germán Olano Airport, Puerto Carreño, Colombia
- Destination: El Dorado International Airport, Bogotá, Colombia
- Occupants: 6
- Passengers: 1
- Crew: 5
- Fatalities: 5
- Injuries: 1
- Survivors: 1

Aerosucre Flight 157 was a domestic cargo flight from Germán Olano Airport in Puerto Carreño, Colombia, to El Dorado International Airport, Bogotá. On 20 December 2016, the Boeing 727-2J0F operating the route overran the runway during takeoff, striking the perimeter fence and other obstacles before becoming airborne, ultimately losing control and crashing 4 nmi (4.6 mi; 7.4 km) from the airport. Of the six people on board, only one survived, with severe injuries.

The subsequent investigation found that a number of factors—including a takeoff weight in excess of the maximum permissible, an incorrect takeoff technique, and a slight tailwind—resulted in the failure of the aircraft to become airborne within the available runway length.

== Accident ==
Map of Colombia showing the location of the crash site at Puerto Carreño airport

External videos
- Footage of the incident on YouTube

The Boeing 727 arrived at Puerto Carreño on the day of the accident at 14:48 local time, after a cargo flight from Bogotá. The crew unloaded 9,264 kilograms (20,423 lb) of cargo. Although the weight and balance manifest of the accident flight was not found, investigators presumed that slightly less than 9,100 kg (20,000 lb) of cargo distributed on nine pallets was loaded for the return to Bogotá. The 727 then taxied onto Runway 25 threshold; the crew set the flaps at 30°, the plane was trimmed for takeoff, and the plane started its takeoff run at 17:18.

The 727 used all of the 1,800-metre (5,900 ft) runway, but was still not airborne. It traveled another 95 m (310 ft) over grass and struck a perimeter fence. It then crossed a road on the airport's perimeter, where numerous motorcyclists and pedestrians narrowly avoided being hit by the aircraft. After crossing the road, the 727 then collided with a shed, then a tree, before finally becoming airborne. The impact detached the right main landing gear from the aircraft, damaged the inboard right flap, caused engine 3 to lose power, and damaged one hydraulic system, causing it to leak. The aircraft achieved an altitude of 790 ft (240 m), entered a slight right-hand descending turn, which completed a near 270° arc, and then impacted flat terrain, bursting into flames. The accident was captured on video by some of the motorcyclists on the perimeter road the aircraft crossed.

== Aircraft and crew ==
The aircraft involved in the crash was a Boeing 727-200 registered HK-4544 with serial number 21105. It entered service in 1975, operating as a passenger aircraft for Air Jamaica until 1997. It was then converted into a cargo aircraft. The aircraft began operating for Aerosucre in 2008.

The captain was 58-year-old Jaime Cantillo, who had been with Aerosucre since 1997 and was licensed to fly the Boeing 727 in 2005. He had logged 8,708 flight hours, including 6,822 hours on the Boeing 727. The first officer was 39-year-old Mauricio Guzmán, who had been with the airline since 2008 and had 3,285 flight hours, all of which were on the Boeing 727. The flight engineer was 72-year-old Pedro Duarte, who joined Aerosucre in 2013 and had logged 1,612 flight hours, though his flight experience on the Boeing 727 was unknown.

== Victims ==
The flight plan indicated five people aboard, but an undocumented sixth person was on the flight. Four people died immediately and two people survived the impact, but one of the survivors died later from injuries. The sole survivor was a flight technician.

== Investigation ==
The Colombian government's Air Accident Investigation Group (Spanish: Grupo de Investigación de Accidentes Aéreos; GRIAA) concluded that three factors extended the aircraft's takeoff run by 380 m (1,250 ft), resulting in a runway excursion that eventually led to the crash:

- The crew incorrectly calculated a rotation speed that was 5 knots (9 km/h; 6 mph) higher than necessary.
- The chosen takeoff runway was subject to a 4-knot (7 km/h; 5 mph) tailwind.
- The pilot rotated the aircraft too slowly, at about 1°/sec instead of 2 to 3°/sec.

Furthermore, although initial calculations suggested the aircraft was operating within its weight limits, the investigators believe, based on the takeoff speeds used by the crew, that the aircraft was actually almost a tonne above its maximum permissible takeoff weight of 74.7 t (74,700 kg; 165,000 lb).

The investigation also determined that, following the loss of pressure in both main hydraulic systems caused by the impact with ground structures, the crew did not activate the standby hydraulic system, which would have enabled them to maintain control of the aircraft.

The operator, Aerosucre, was found in breach of regulations, since Puerto Carreño airport was not approved for operations with the Boeing 727-200, and the Colombian civil aviation authority allowed this breach to continue for years through a lack of supervision.
