= Puerto Carreño =

Puerto Carreno Picacho del Orinoco
- Consolidated Capital City | Municipality
- Puerto Carreño
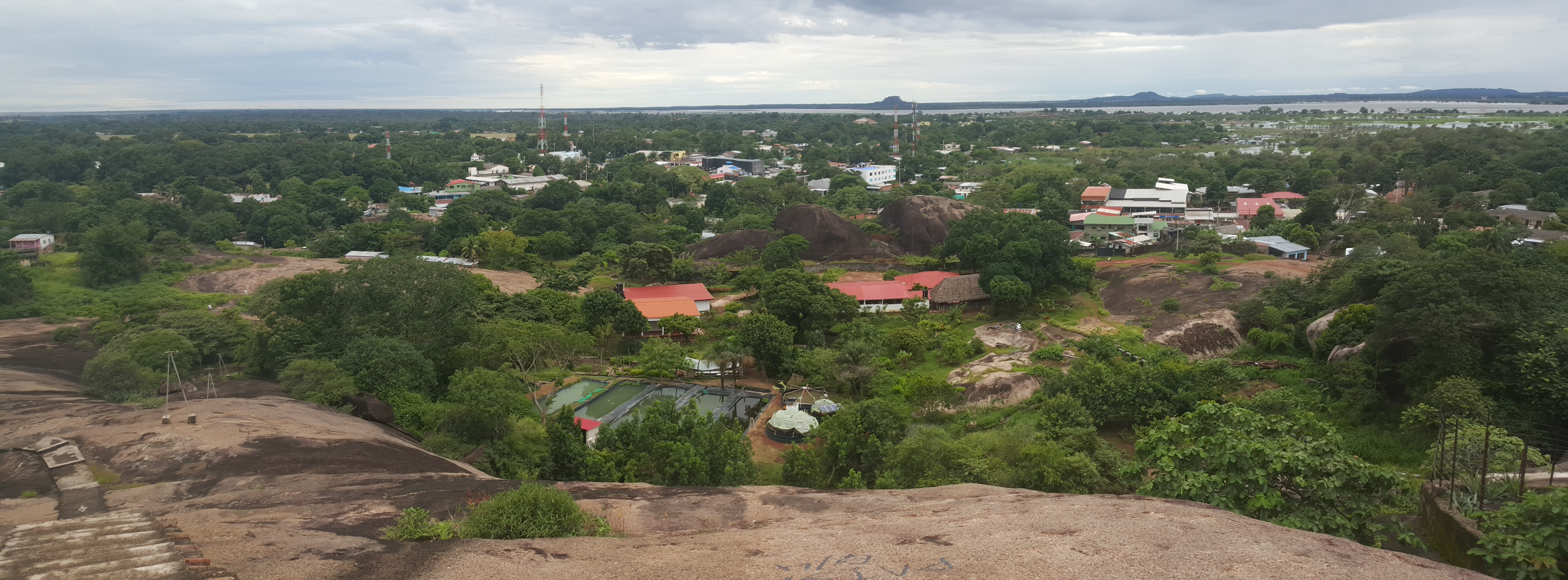
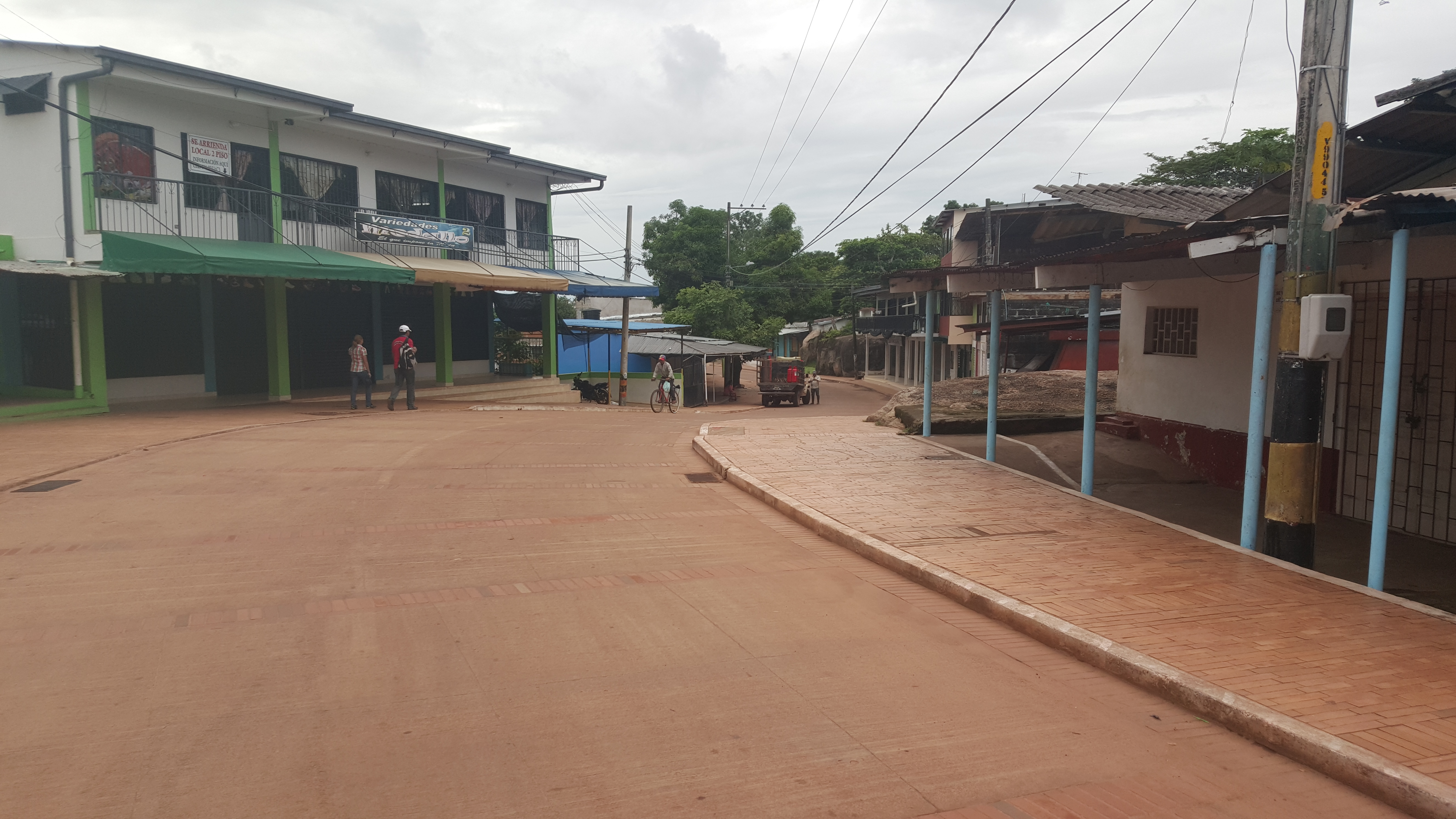
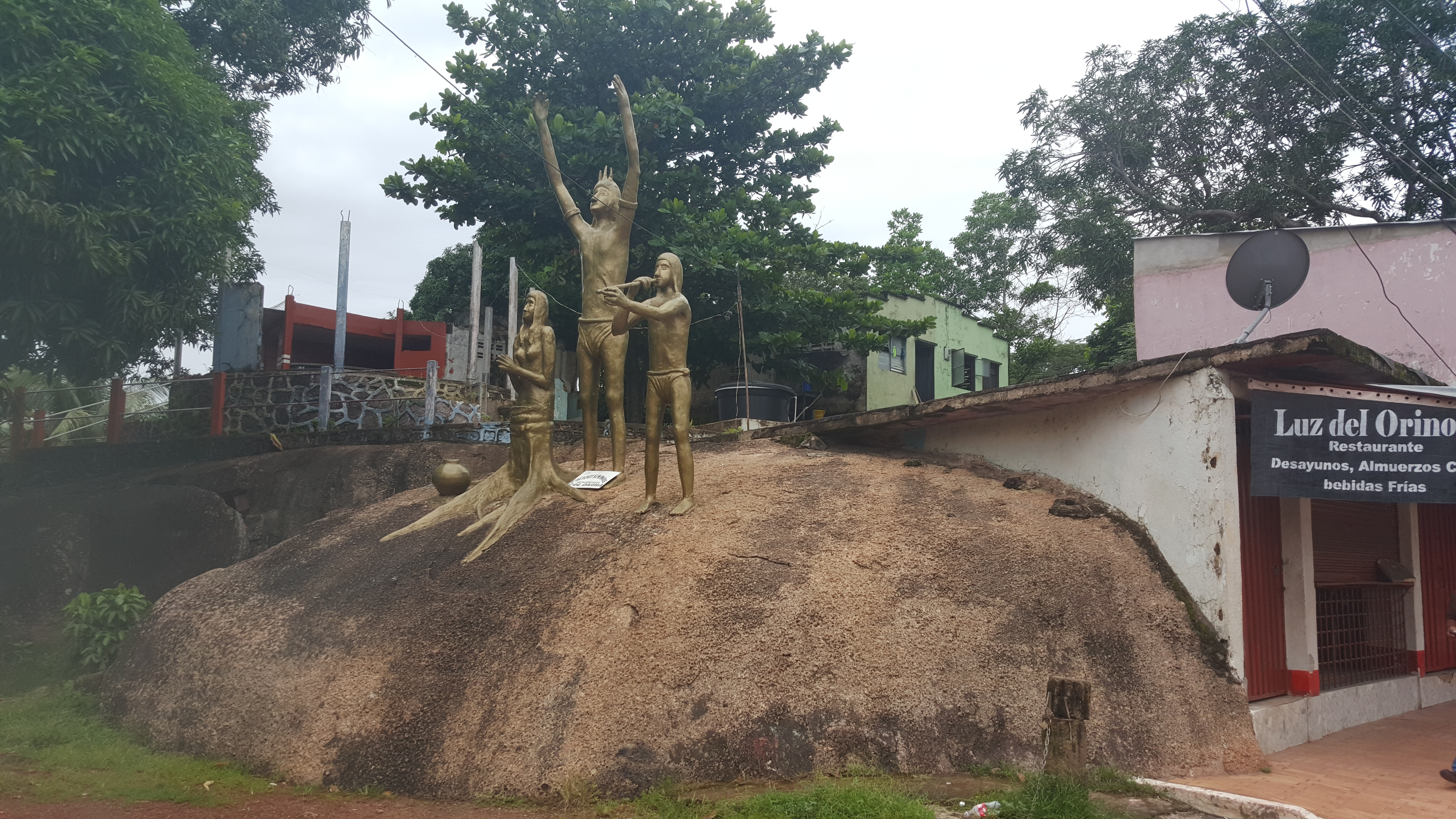
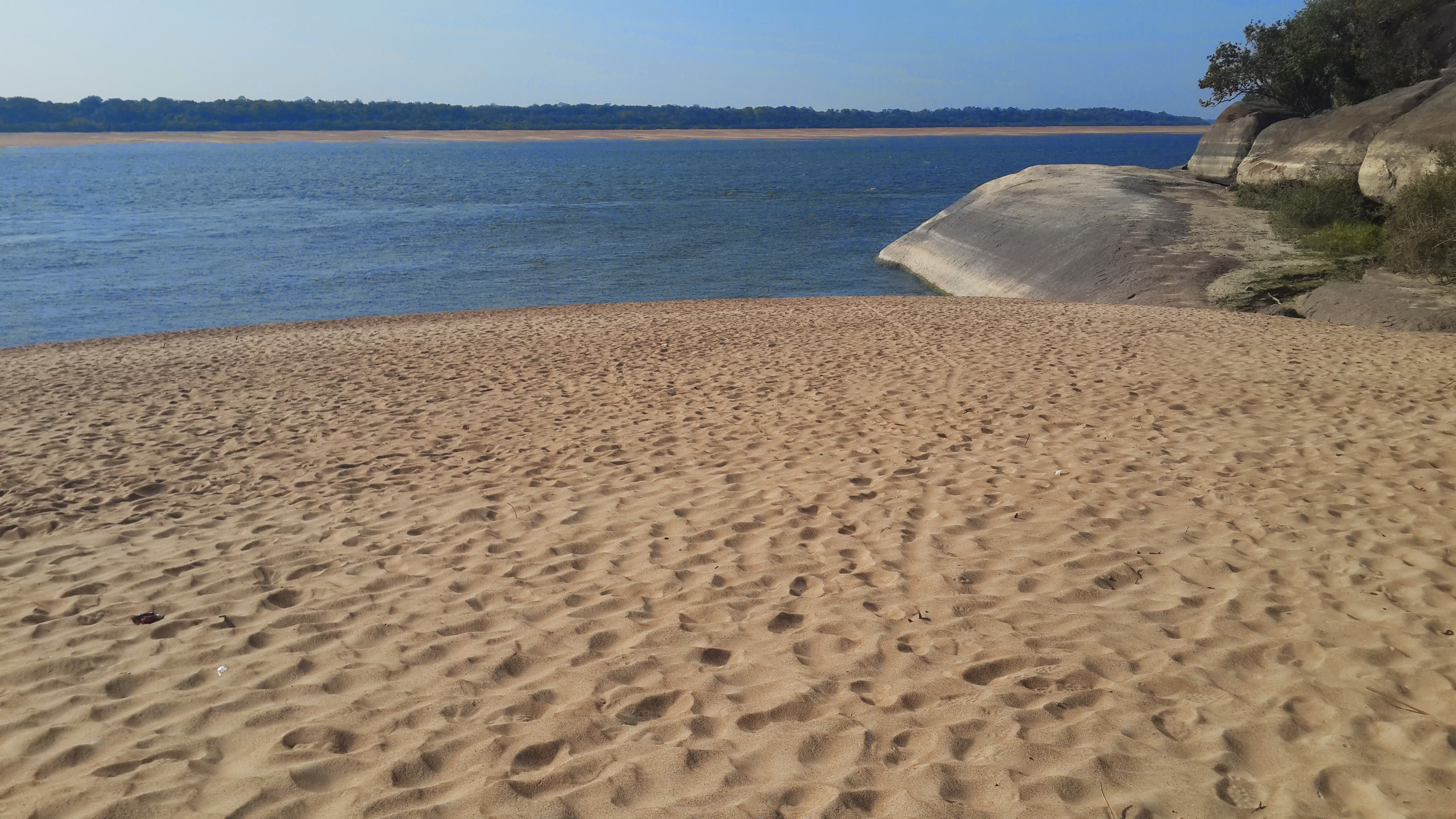
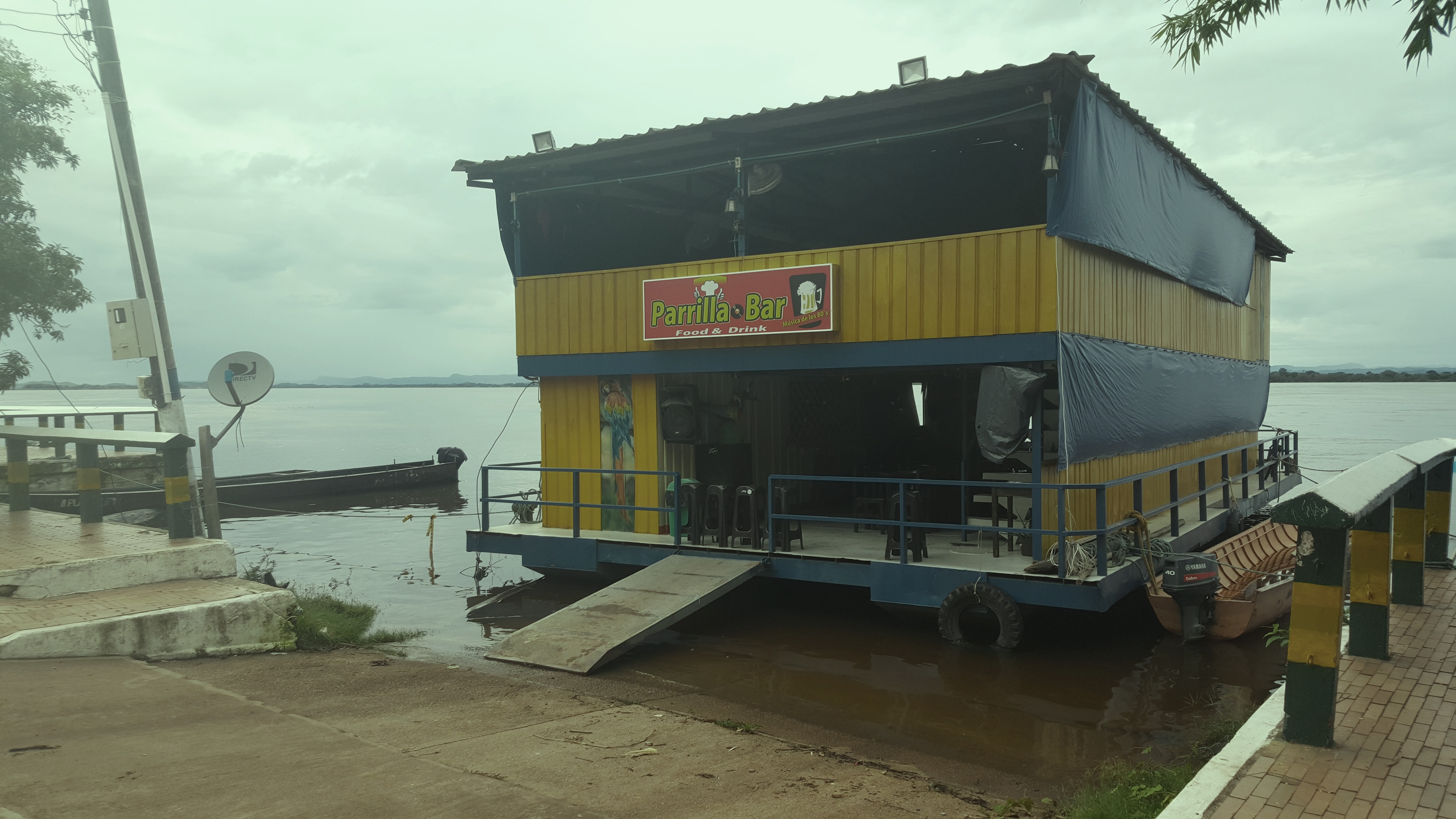
- From the top: Puerto Carreño skyline panorama, street in the city, statues of Indigenous peoples near docks, Orinoco River beach and a discoteque/restaurant floating on the Orinoco.

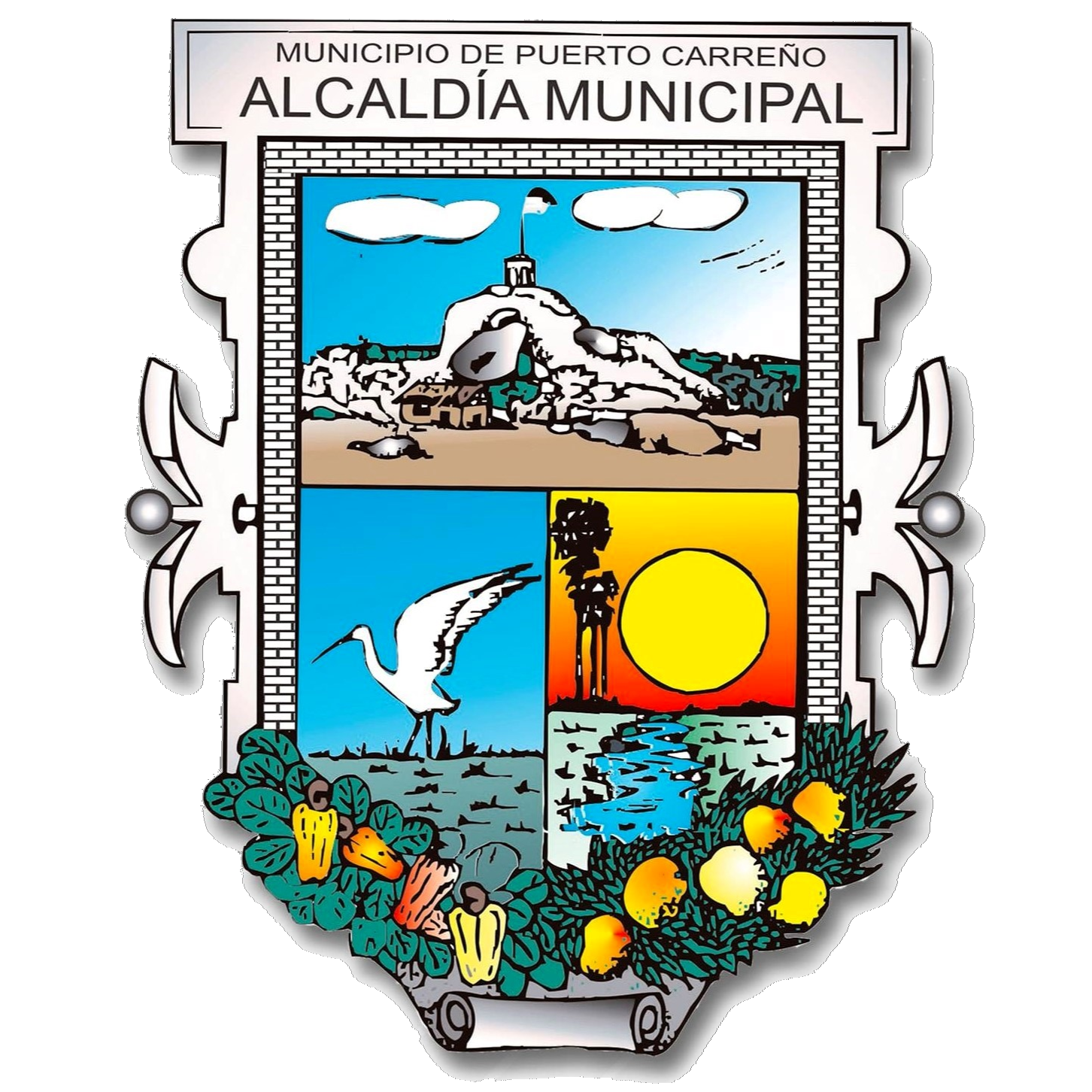
- Flag Coat of arms
- Nickname: Capital of Indigenous Artisans
- Location of the capital city and municipality of Puerto Carreño in the Department of Vichada.
- Coordinates: 6°11′25″N 67°29′01″W
- Country: Colombia
- Region: Orinoquía
- Department: Department of Vichada
- Foundation: 1913
- Named for: Pedro María Carreño, Commissioner 1912

Government
  - Mayor: Jair Esteban Beltrán

Area
  - Consolidated Capital City | Municipality: 12,409 km^{2} (4,791 sq mi)
  - Urban: 7.5 km^{2} (2.9 sq mi)
  - Metro: 22.5 km^{2} (8.7 sq mi)
- Elevation: 51 m (167 ft)

Population (2018)
  - Consolidated Capital City | Municipality: 20,936
  - Estimate (2023): 22,500
  - Density: 1.6872/km^{2} (4.3697/sq mi)
  - Urban: 12,897
  - Metro: 14,974
- Demonym: Carreñense
- Time zone: UTC−5 (COT)
- Climate: Am
- Website: Government; Tourism Council

Puerto Carreño (Spanish pronunciation: [ˈpweɾto kaˈreɲo]) is the departmental capital city, and a municipality of the department of Vichada in the Llanos of Colombia located on the Orinoco River. Puerto Carreño is best-known as a tourist gateway to hundreds of adventure, ecological and sustainable tourism destinations, it is well-known for peacock bass fishing on the Vita River, Indigenous artisans from the Orinoquia, as a river port trade center, and as a frontier settlement that has become the capital of the second largest department (province) in Colombia.

Puerto Carreño is also known as the Colombian city with more trees than most, it is known agriculturally for marañon fruit (cashew) and in the city limits there are more than a dozen different types of mango tree varieties.

== History ==
In 1913 the Colombian government created the province (comisaria) of Vichada and it was decided that its capital should be at the convergence of the Orinoco and Meta rivers where there was a small village known locally as El Picacho del Orinoco. In 1934 "El Picacho" was officially renamed after Pedro María Carreño, the Colombian Minister of External Relations from 1912 to 1913. The "municipio" (similar to county in the U.S.) was created in 1974. On July 5, 1991, Vichada's status was updated to "departamento" under the Colombian Constitution and Puerto Carreño was ratified as its capital.

The DANE (Colombian government's bureau for statistics) projected Puerto Carreño's municipal population to be around 10,034 for 2005, based on the 1993 Census. There are several Indigenous tribes within Puerto Carreño's administrative region as well, Indigenous peoples account for 54% of the local population.

== Geography ==
The municipality of Puerto Carreño is located on the extreme northeastern part of the Department of Vichada bordering to the north and east with Venezuela using the Meta and Orinoco rivers as borders. To the south Puerto Carreño limits with the municipality of Cumaribo and to the west with the municipality of La Primavera.

The area of the municipality is uniformly flat, although there is a very slight rise at the town which gave it its original name. The climate is hot and humid, averaging a temperature of 28 °C or 82.4 °F with a heavy rain season from April through September.

The area of the municipality is within the llanos plains which cover large areas in Colombia and Venezuela that are rich in biodiversity. Geologically the municipality of Puerto Carreño lies on the Guiana Shield mostly made up by Cenozoic and Precambric formations, with some low altitude mountains such as the Mounts of Casuarito and the Hormiga and Guaripa mountains.

== Economy ==
Economic activity is based on agricultural and ranching activities, tourism, fishing, and mining. There is some international trading activity with Venezuelan towns across the Orinoco River international border: Puerto Carreño often trades commercially with the neighboring town of Puerto Páez in Venezuela. Main products of the region are rice, yuca and plantain. Sportfishing is practiced on private ranches, agritourism and ecotourism on large farms which have become tourist destinations. There are gold, coltan and silver mines, exploited in a rudimentary way.

== Tourism ==
Puerto Carreño, traditionally known as a frontier river port, small town, and transit point for neighboring regions, now functions as an independent travel destination featuring local attractions, annual events, and regional celebrations.

International visitors in Puerto Carreño can eat 3 meals a day in restaurants and sleep in a hotel room all for less than $50 per day (2023). Private creative ecotourism (adventures) based on a spending limit of under $250 USD per day are sustainable experiences that accountably pay 30% to 60% back into Indigenous community development, improve tourism infrastructures and agroforestry programs. Those looking for a ecotourism experience are assured that their participation and patronage as a tourist is being well received and helping the community being visited.

The newly remodelled Germán Olano Airport due to be completed by the end of 2023 is expected to boost the tourism industry for Puerto Carreño making it a climate adjustment center and hub for adventurous overnight travellers, as well as budget minded visitors looking for a getaway vacation or complete escape from civilization.

== Climate ==
Puerto Carreño has a tropical monsoon climate (Köppen Am) with a hot to sweltering dry season from December to March, and a hot and very humid wet season from April to November.

Climate data for Puerto Carreño (Germán Olano Airport), elevation 50 m (160 ft), (1981–2010)
| Month | Jan | Feb | Mar | Apr | May | Jun | Jul | Aug | Sep | Oct | Nov | Dec | Year |
|---|---|---|---|---|---|---|---|---|---|---|---|---|---|
| Mean daily maximum °C (°F) | 34.8 (94.6) | 35.7 (96.3) | 36.1 (97.0) | 34.3 (93.7) | 32.2 (90.0) | 31.0 (87.8) | 30.7 (87.3) | 31.4 (88.5) | 32.4 (90.3) | 33.3 (91.9) | 33.5 (92.3) | 33.8 (92.8) | 33.3 (91.9) |
| Daily mean °C (°F) | 29.5 (85.1) | 30.4 (86.7) | 30.9 (87.6) | 29.5 (85.1) | 27.8 (82.0) | 26.8 (80.2) | 26.6 (79.9) | 26.9 (80.4) | 27.5 (81.5) | 28.1 (82.6) | 28.5 (83.3) | 28.9 (84.0) | 28.5 (83.3) |
| Mean daily minimum °C (°F) | 23.2 (73.8) | 23.9 (75.0) | 24.7 (76.5) | 24.6 (76.3) | 24.1 (75.4) | 23.4 (74.1) | 23.2 (73.8) | 23.4 (74.1) | 23.7 (74.7) | 23.9 (75.0) | 24.0 (75.2) | 23.7 (74.7) | 23.8 (74.8) |
| Average precipitation mm (inches) | 11.1 (0.44) | 17.0 (0.67) | 45.4 (1.79) | 156.1 (6.15) | 285.3 (11.23) | 466.3 (18.36) | 487.9 (19.21) | 340.9 (13.42) | 208.5 (8.21) | 167.5 (6.59) | 108.8 (4.28) | 33.8 (1.33) | 2,328.8 (91.69) |
| Average precipitation days | 2 | 3 | 5 | 13 | 21 | 25 | 26 | 24 | 19 | 17 | 11 | 5 | 169 |
| Average relative humidity (%) | 62 | 58 | 58 | 67 | 76 | 80 | 80 | 79 | 77 | 75 | 73 | 68 | 71 |
| Mean monthly sunshine hours | 260.4 | 231.5 | 223.2 | 171.0 | 142.6 | 126.0 | 139.5 | 148.8 | 162.0 | 195.3 | 207.0 | 238.7 | 2,246 |
| Mean daily sunshine hours | 8.4 | 8.2 | 7.2 | 5.7 | 4.6 | 4.2 | 4.5 | 4.8 | 5.4 | 6.3 | 6.9 | 7.7 | 6.2 |
Source: Instituto de Hidrologia Meteorologia y Estudios Ambientales

== See also ==
- Orinoquía Region
- Vichada Department
