= Moorea Airport =

Airport in French Polynesia

Moorea Airport Aéroport de Moorea
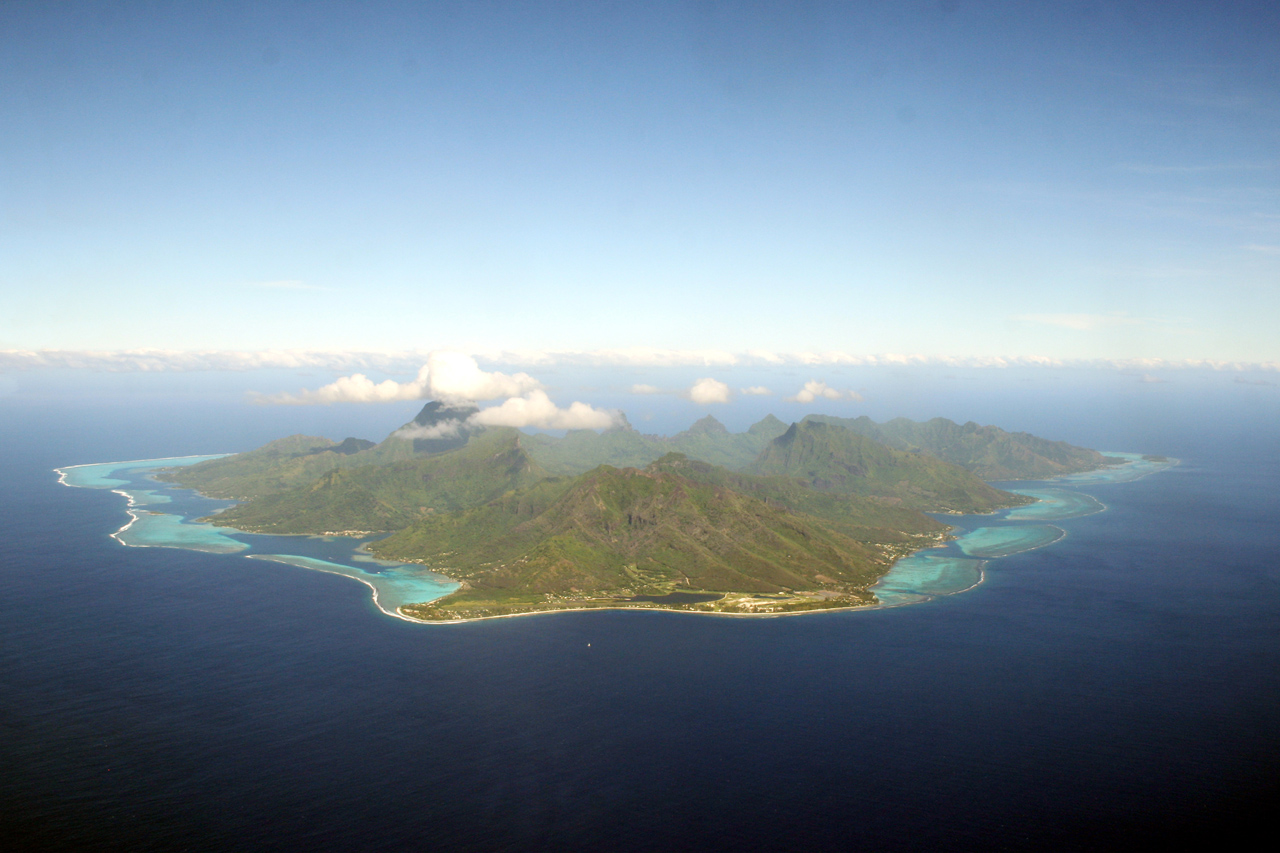
- View on approach to Moorea Airport
- IATA: MOZ; ICAO: NTTM

Summary
- Airport type: Public
- Operator: SETIL Aéroports
- Serves: Moorea, French Polynesia, France
- Elevation AMSL: 16 ft (4.9 m)
- Coordinates: 17°29′22″S 149°45′44″W

Map
- Location of airport in French Polynesia

Runways
Direction	Length		Surface
Direction	m	ft	Surface
12/30	1,237	4,058	Asphalt
- Sources: French AIP, UAF, DAFIF

Moorea Airport (French: Aéroport de Moorea) (IATA: MOZ, ICAO: NTTM) is an airport serving the island of Moorea in French Polynesia, France. It is also known as Temae Airport or Moorea Temae Airport for its location near the village of Temae in northeastern Moorea. The airport is located 7.5 km (4.0 NM) northeast of Afareaitu, the island's main village. It is also 15 km (8.1 NM) west of the island of Tahiti. The airport opened on October 6, 1967.

== History ==
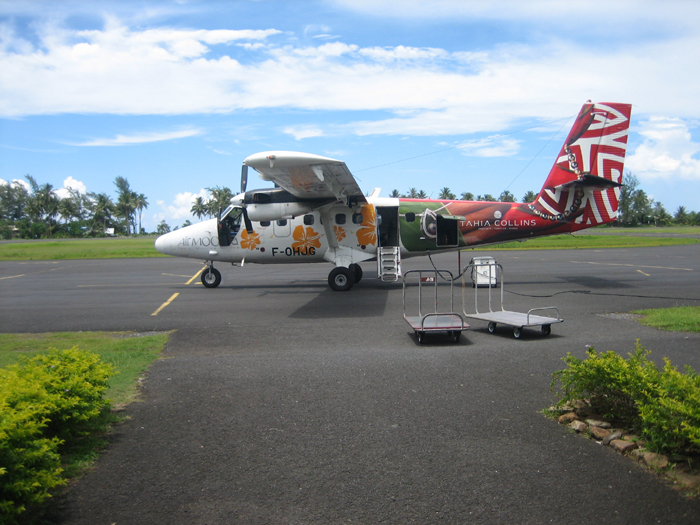
Air Moorea aircraft at Moorea Airport

- 27 March 1967: Construction of the runway at Moorea‑Temae.
- 6 October 1967: Opening of the Temae airfield.
- 1977: The Moorea-Temae aerodrome is transferred to the SETIL - Société d'Équipement de Tahiti et des Iles (Equipment Company of Tahiti and the Islands).
- 1982: Construction of the existing terminal and adding additional parking spaces.
- 1987: Lengthening the runway to accommodate ATR 42.
- 1990: Construction of a new control tower.
- 2003: Work and upgrading to accommodate ATR 72.

== Facilities ==
The airport resides at an elevation of 16 feet (5 m) above mean sea level. It has one runway designated 12/30 with an asphalt surface measuring 1,237 by 30 metres (4,058 ft × 98 ft).

== Airlines and destinations ==
=== Passenger ===
Airlines	Destinations
Air Moana	Bora Bora, Huahine-Fare, Papeete
Air Tahiti	Bora Bora, Huahine-Fare, Papeete, Raiatea

== Ground Transportation ==
The Moorea Tour Bus comes to the airport to pick up or drop off people. The bus is yellow and green.

== Accidents and incidents ==
- On August 9, 2007, Air Moorea Flight 1121 crashed shortly after taking off from Temae Airport. The de Havilland Canada DHC-6 Twin Otter was bound for Tahiti's Faa'a International Airport. The report found that the crash was caused by the failure of the pitch control cables following the retraction of the flaps after take-off, which causes significant torque on that aircraft and thus additional pressure on the cables. The failure was caused by significant wear due to the lack of special maintenance and inspections for the stainless-steel cables (which are more subject to wear than their carbon steel counterparts), and exacerbated by the jet-blast of an A340 while the aircraft was parked. Another contributory cause for the crash were found to be the lack of pilot training for loss of pitch control. All 19 passengers and the sole crew member died. Amongst those 19 passengers were two European Union officials.

== Annual statistics ==
Annual statistics for Moorea Airport:

	2005	2006	2007	2008	2009
Passengers	221,888	228,813	193,033	135,144	119,602
Cargo (Tons)	25	30	35	36	32
Aircraft movements	23,794	23 602	18,975	16,092	14,360

== See also ==
- Air Moorea Flight 1121
- List of airports in French Polynesia
