= Germán Olano Airport =

Germán Olano Airport Puerto Carreño Airport
- IATA: PCR; ICAO: SKPC

Summary
- Airport type: Public
- Serves: Puerto Carreño, Colombia
- Elevation AMSL: 177 ft / 54 m
- Coordinates: 06°11′05″N 67°29′35″W

Map
- Location of airport in Colombia

Runways
Direction	Length		Surface
Direction	m	ft	Surface
07/25	1,800	5,906	Asphalt
- Source: AIP Colombia at UAEAC

Germán Olano Airport (Spanish: Aeropuerto Germán Olano, IATA: PCR, ICAO: SKPC) is an airport serving Puerto Carreño, the capital of Vichada Department in Colombia. It is also known as Puerto Carreño Airport (Aeropuerto Puerto Carreño). The airport is 1.5 kilometres (0.93 mi) west of and parallels the Orinoco River, locally Colombia's border with Venezuela.

== Airlines and destinations ==
=== Passenger ===
Airlines	Destinations
SATENA	Bogotá, Villavicencio

== Accidents and incidents ==
On December 20, 2016, Aerosucre Flight 157 crashed while taking off from the airport after failing to become airborne. It was reported that 5 aboard the Boeing 727-200 died, and 1 crew member survived with injuries.

== See also ==
- Transport in Colombia
- List of airports in Colombia
