= Huacaraje Municipality =

Coordinates: 13.6667°S 63.9667°W

- Municipality
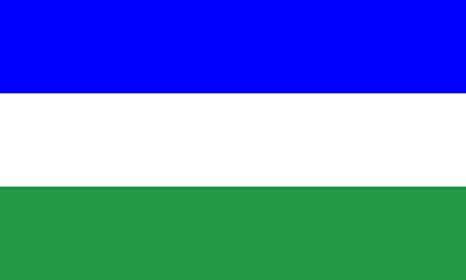
- Flag
- Interactive map of Huacaraje Municipality
- Country: Bolivia
- Department: Beni Department
- Province: Iténez Province
- Time zone: UTC-4 (BOT)

Huacaraje (or Guacaraje) is a municipality and locality in Bolivia, located in the Iténez province in the Beni Department. It is situated between the towns of Magdalena and Baures. The municipality covers an area of 9,876 km² and has an approximate population of 3,700 inhabitants, with a population density of about 2.7 inhabitants per km².

It features a tropical-humid climate, with heavy rainfall, and an average temperature of 32.5°C.

== History ==
According to historian Saúl Suárez Medina in his work "Almanaque Oriental", this town was founded on November 29, 1800, with 80 families from the Itonama ethnic group by Ramón Velarde, the corregidor of Magdalena at the time, as a resting point for travelers covering the 14 leagues between Magdalena and Baures.

According to this historian, the name "Huacaraje" originates from the Itonama word "Guacanaro", which means "place of rest".

== Economy ==
The main economic activity is livestock farming, and due to the sandy loam soil, subsistence agriculture is also practiced. There is also subsistence craftwork such as weaving hammocks, making hats, wood crafts, and other ethnic-origin activities like hunting, fishing, and gathering wild fruits, including cocoa.

== Administrative division ==
Besides the urban area (2,300 inhabitants), it has 3 communities:

- La Embrolla (113 inhabitants),
- Pariagua (12 inhabitants),
- Isla Grande (54 inhabitants), and
- the canton El Carmen (1,063 inhabitants), with 3 communities respectively:
  - Buena Hora (35 inhabitants),
  - San Pedro (82 inhabitants), and
  - Besuria (20 inhabitants)

== Notable personalities ==
Jessica Jordan, Miss Bolivia and a two-time candidate for the governorship of Beni, was born and spent her childhood in this municipality.

== See also ==
- Iténez Province
- Baures
- Laguna Todos Santos
