= Bella Vista, Beni =

Bella Vista
- Town
- Location of Bella Vista in Bolivia
- Coordinates: 13°16′28″S 63°42′21″W
- Country: Bolivia
- Elevation: 486 ft (148 m)
- Time zone: UTC-4 (BOT)

Bella Vista is a small town on the San Martin River in Bolivia. In 2010 it had an estimated population of 2541.

The town is served by Irobi Airport.

== Location ==
Bella Vista is in the Magdalena Municipality of the Iténez Province at an elevation of 148 metres (486 ft). The town is 40 kilometres (25 mi) east of the provincial capital Magdalena and 240 kilometres (150 mi) northeast of Trinidad.
