= Itonama language =

Dormant language of Bolivia

Itonama
- sihni padara
- Native to: Bolivia
- Region: Beni Department
- Ethnicity: 2,900 Itonama people (2006)
- Extinct: 2012–2023
- Language family: Language isolate
- Writing system: Latin

Official status
- Official language in: Bolivia

Language codes
- ISO 639-3: ito
- Glottolog: iton1250
- ELP: Itonama

Itonama (Itonama: sihnipadara '1PL.EXCL-word') is an extinct language isolate once spoken by the Itonama people in the Amazonian lowlands of north-eastern Bolivia. It was spoken on the Itonomas River and Lake in Beni Department.

== Geographic distribution ==
The Itonama have resided in their current area, corresponding to the current Mamoré and Iténez Provinces in Beni Department, since they were contacted by Spaniards in the 17th century. The last speakers of Itonama resided in the town of Magdalena, located on the western bank of the Itonama River (a tributary of the Iténez River), located in Iténez Province.

== History ==
Hardly anything of the original Itonama culture remains today, as they have been Christian for the past 300 years. In 2023, only a few elderly people could remember a few words and phrases of the language in Magdalena, thereby rendering Itonama "virtually extinct". In spite of the fact that Itonama has no speakers, a total of 1,249 people claimed to speak the language in 2012.

=== Language contact ===
Marcelo Jolkesky (2016) identifies lexical similarities with the Nambikwaran languages, which he postulates is due to contact.

== Classification ==
In his classification of South American languages, American ethnologist Daniel Garrison Brinton (1891) left Itonama unclassified, followed in this respect by Alexander Francis Chamberlain (1910, 1913) and classified as an isolate by Czech linguist Čestmír Loukotka (1968). However, Clements Markham (1910) classified the Itonama as a branch of the Arawakan Moxo, and Loukotka's earlier 1935 classification identified influence from Arawakan languages. Morris Swadesh (1959, 1962) grouped Itonama with the Quechuan languages. Joseph Greenberg's 1987 classification in his book Language in the Americas grouped Itonama as a member of his universally rejected "Amerind" language family, within his "Chibchan-Paezan" subgroup.

== Phonology ==
=== Vowels ===
	Front	Central	Back
High	i	ɨ ⟨ï⟩	u
Mid	e ~ ɛ ⟨e⟩		o
Low		a ⟨a⟩	

Diphthongs are /ai au/ ⟨ay aw⟩.

=== Consonants ===
		Bilabial	Alveolar	Post- alveolar	Palatal	Velar	Glottal
Nasal		m	n				
Plosive/ Affricate	plain	p	t	tʃ ~ ts ⟨ch⟩	tʲ ⟨ty⟩	k ⟨k⟩	ʔ ⟨’⟩
Plosive/ Affricate	ejective		tʼ	tʃʼ ~ tsʼ ⟨chʼ⟩		kʼ ⟨kʼ⟩	
Plosive/ Affricate	voiced	b	d				
Fricative			s				h
Liquid	lateral		l				
Liquid	rhotic		ɾ ⟨r⟩				
Semivowel		w ~ β ⟨w⟩			j ⟨y⟩		

The postalveolar affricates /tʃ tʃʼ/ have alveolar allophones [ts tsʼ]. Variation occurs between speakers, and even within the speech of a single person.

The semivowel /w/ is realized as a bilabial fricative [β] when preceded and followed by identical vowels.

== Morphology ==
Itonama is a polysynthetic, head-marking, verb-initial language with an accusative alignment system along with an inverse subsystem in independent clauses, and straightforward accusative alignment in dependent clauses.

Nominal morphology lacks case declension and adpositions and so is simpler than verbal morphology (which has body-part and location incorporation, directionals, evidentials, verbal classifiers, among others).

== Vocabulary ==
The forms cited here are from the Intercontinental Dictionary Series (IDS), which takes its data from Camp and Liccardi (1967).

gloss	Itonama (IDS)
one	u-kʼaʔne
two	-tʃupa
tooth	oh-womotʼe
tongue	oh-potʃosnila
hand	uh-maʔpara
woman	wabɨʔka
water	wanuʔwe
fire	u-bari
moon	u-ʔtʲahka-ʔkaʔka
maize	u-tʃuʔu, kanasbɨstʃa
house	u-ku

== See also ==
- Llanos de Moxos (archaeology)
- Macro-Paesan languages
