= Llanos de Moxos (archaeology) =

Archaeological site in Bolivia

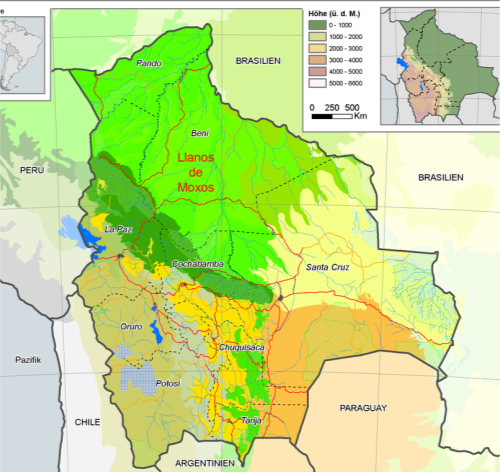
A map of Bolivia highlighting the location of the Llanos de Moxos

The Llanos de Moxos, also known as the Moxos plains, are the extensive material culture of pre-Columbian agricultural societies scattered over the Moxos plains in most of Beni Department, Bolivia and a small part of Rondônia, Brazil. The remains testify to a well-organized and numerous indigenous people. This contradicts the traditional view of archaeologists, notably Betty Meggers, who asserted that the Amazon River Basin was not environmentally able to sustain a large population and that its indigenous inhabitants were hunter-gatherer bands or slash-and-burn farmers. In the 1960s, petroleum company geologists and geographer William Denevan were among the first to publicize the existence of extensive prehistoric earthworks constructed in the Amazon, especially in the Llanos de Moxos.

A large part of the Llanos de Moxos is covered with water during the rainy season. Many types of earthworks have been documented in the Llanos, including monumental mounds, raised fields for agriculture, natural and constructed forest islands, canals, causeways, ring ditches, and fish weirs. Archaeological investigations in the Llanos have not been extensive and many questions remain about the cultures of the prehistoric inhabitants. To date, there is no evidence that the inhabitants were politically united in pre-Columbian times, but rather they seem to have been organized into a large number of small, independent polities speaking a variety of different, unrelated languages. Lidar data reported in 2022 may reveal much about sites that have not been investigated. This may help to establish a clearer understanding of these prehistoric cultures.

Evidence of people living in the Llanos dates back to 8000 BCE. Archaeologists have found artifacts in the monumental mounds dating to as early as 800 BCE. The Casarabe culture, which developed a complex network of monumental settlements in the region, flourished from approximately 500 to 1400 CE. The reasons for the decline of this settlement network remain uncertain. The Llanos were heavily populated by indigenous people until the arrival of the Spanish in the late 17th century.

== Environment ==
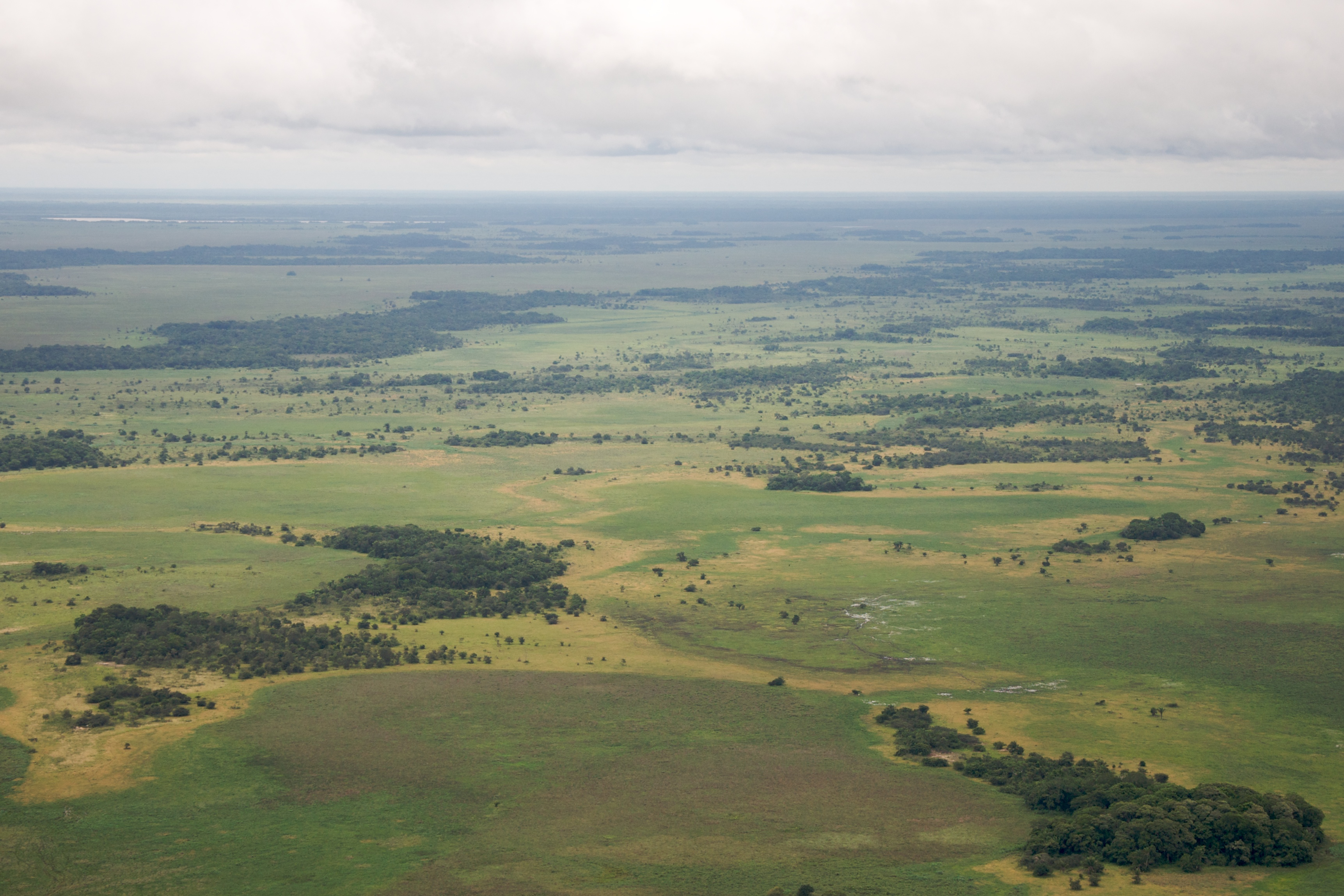
The Llanos are characterized by vast wet plains

Differing definitions of the area comprising the Llanos de Moxos in northern Bolivia result in estimates of their size ranging from 110,000 square kilometres (42,000 sq mi) to 200,000 square kilometres (77,000 sq mi). This area is characterized by flat terrain, many rivers and shallow lakes, and a tropical climate with pronounced wet and dry seasons. Fifty to sixty percent of the land is flooded from four to ten months per year. The Llanos are located mostly in the drainage basin of the Mamoré River. The main contemporary urban center in the Llanos is the present-day city of Trinidad.

Historically, archaeologists and geographers held that the Amazon basin was incapable of supporting large, complex pre-Columbian societies because of poor soils for agriculture, protein deficiency of inhabitants, lack of domesticated animals, and limited technology. This view has subsequently been challenged in the Llanos de Moxos. Lidar Data suggests that pre-Columbian indigenous societies were able to overcome environmental limitations.

In general, soil fertility in the Llanos decreases from south to north. The soils of the southernmost Llanos benefit from the deposits of sediments by rivers flowing down from the nearby Andes. The quantities of those sediments decrease northward and the typical infertile lateritic soils of the Amazon prevail. Associated with prehistoric settlements is Amazonian dark earth, called "terra mulata" or terra preta. These highly-productive soils are the product of human occupation and endeavors to improve soil fertility. The people of the Moxos plains domesticated their landscape by practicing raised bed agriculture and improving soils by the addition of organic matter.

== Earthworks ==
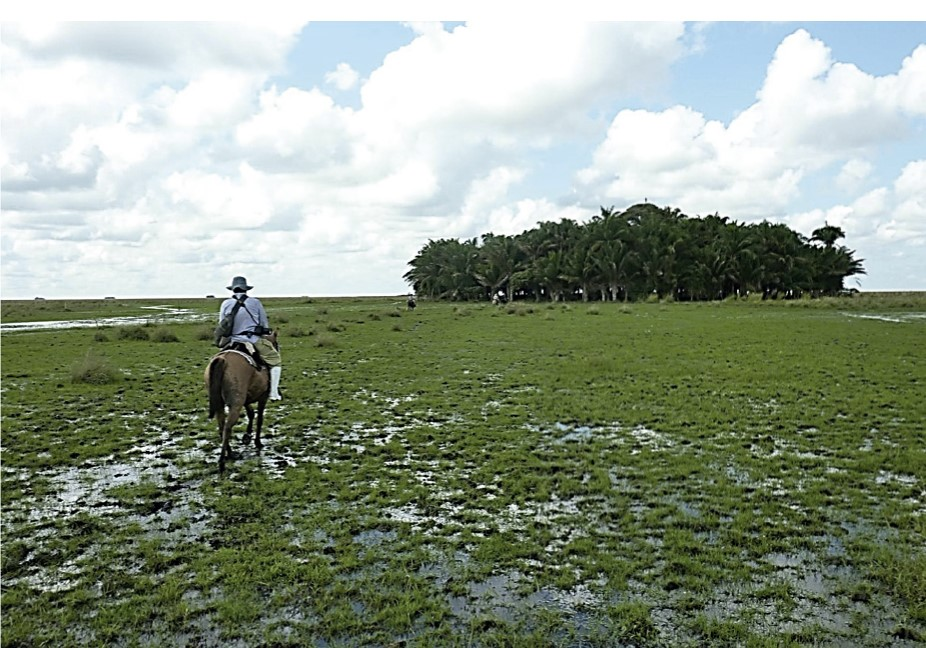
An island, possibly artificial, in the Llanos de Moxos, Bolivia

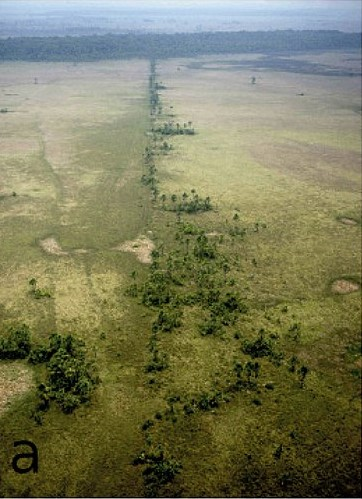
This prehistoric causeway was constructed to connect two islands in the Llanos de Moxos, Bolivia

A variety of earthworks have been identified throughout the Llanos de Moxos. These features include mounds, raised fields, fish weirs, forest islands, ring ditches, canals, causeways, and geoglyphs. While some of the forest islands are potentially natural features, the majority of these structures are considered to have an anthropogenic origin. However, none of these earthworks are built using stone; stonework, characteristic of the highland civilization west of the Llanos, was not a feature because there was no surface stone in the area. Additionally, comparatively little is known about the number and social complexity of the societies that constructed them.

Some of the most intensively studied earthworks are located in the Casarabe region of the southeastern Llanos de Moxos. There, remote-sensing and archaeological investigations have revealed that a pre-Columbian society (known as the 'Casarabe Culture') constructed a dense settlement network consisting of over 189 earthen settlement mounds (lomas in Spanish), interconnected via causeways and canals. The mounds are typically between 3 metres (9.8 ft) to 20 metres (66 ft) high, and cover a basal area of between 2 hectares (4.9 acres) and 30 hectares (74 acres). The canals have been identified in a variety of sizes and depths, reaching several metres deep in forested areas. Covering an area of at least 4,500 km^{2} (1,700 sq mi), the Casarabe Culture developed this settlement complex prior to European contact, between 500 CE and 1400 CE. Recent research suggests that the Casarabe Culture developed into a society containing at least 10,000 people and, based on the complexity of their earthworks, some scholars also believe that they practiced a form of agrarian urbanism. However, others have postulated that a small population could have built these earthworks slowly over a long period of time.

The Casarabe culture existed in the Llanos de Moxos region from approximately 400 to 1400 CE, during which time it established extensive settlements. The reasons for the decline of this culture remain unclear, although environmental changes may have played a role.

Smaller mounds are also found in several other parts of the Llanos de Moxos, suggesting that several distinct regional polities existed. The purpose of the small mounds, less than 3 metres (9.8 ft) high, was residential and agricultural.

Agricultural fields demonstrate that farming in some parts of the Llanos de Moxos was conducted on long narrow strips of land raised by humans up to 1 metre (3.3 ft) above floodwater levels. The remains of strips, called "camellónes" in Spanish, are as long as 600 metres (2,000 ft) and 20 metres (66 ft) wide. The raised fields permitted drainage during the rainy season. Raised fields may have covered as much as 1,000,000 hectares (2,500,000 acres) of land in the Moxos Plains. Maize and cassava (Yuca) were probably the principal crops.

Forest islands rise above the surrounding swamps, and were used for home sites, agriculture, hunting, and harvesting of wild plant products.

Canals and causeways often connected areas of human settlement, radiating outward from the large mounds. They served multiple functions: transportation, drainage, boundary markers, and enhancing fishery resources. Zigzag causeways in some areas are interpreted as being fish weirs. Fish were probably the main source of protein for the prehistoric inhabitants.

Ring ditches are found in many areas. Ditches were constructed to encircle areas of human settlement and functioned both for drainage of water in the rainy season and for storage of water during the dry season. They were usually less than 1 metre (3.3 ft) in depth and 3 metres (9.8 ft) to 5 metres (16 ft) in width.

== Variations among regions ==
Four eco-archaeological regions are identified in the Llanos de Moxos.

Region one: North of the city of Santa Ana del Yacuma and west of the Mamoré River is an area of water-logged and poor soils. Many large raised agricultural fields are the distinctive remains of its prehistoric inhabitants, the raised fields being necessary for drainage and improvement of the soils. Although there was probably a large prehistoric population in this region, there is little evidence of a complex society.

Region two: East of the Mamoré River and centered on the town of Baures and the Baures River is an area of many forested islands, mostly natural, which were inhabited and circled by ditched agricultural fields, ring ditches, fish weirs, and many canals and zigzag causeways. It appears that the earthworks in this area were constructed not long before the Spanish arrived.

Region three: West of the city of Trinidad centered on the town of San Ignacio de Moxos is an area in which soils are relatively fertile and hosting a large number of earthworks, including mounds, man-made forested islands, raised fields and causeways. The proliferation of earthworks and their variety suggest a more complex prehistoric society than those of regions one and two.

Region four: East of the city of Trinidad and centered on the town of Casarabe is the most fertile and the least-waterlogged region of the Llanos. It contains large numbers of monumental mounds and associated agricultural fields and integrated earthworks. This region probably hosted the most complex societies of the prehistoric Llanos de Moxos.

== People ==
Archaeologists have found indirect evidence of a human presence in the Llanos de Moxos dating to 8000 BCE in shell middens on several forest islands.

Some of the artifacts in the monumental mounds have been radiocarbon dated to as long ago as 800 BCE. The early Spaniards found six principal ethnic groups in the Llanos: the Moxo (or Mojo), Movima, Canichana, Cayuvava, Itonama, and Bauré. The names of 26 other groups are known. The Baure were considered by the Spanish to be the most "civilized", followed by the Moxo. The other groups lived in smaller communities and on less favored lands. The Canichana or Canisiana were warlike hunters who occupied prime riverfront property on the Mamoré River.

The Llanos were a patchwork of unrelated languages. The Baure and Moxo spoke Arawak languages. Linguists believe that the Arawakan peoples originated further north in the central Amazon basin and migrated to the Llanos, bringing their cassava-based agriculture with them. Most of the other ethnic groups were probably earlier inhabitants of the Llanos than the Arawak-speakers, although the distinct hunting and warrior culture of the Canichana suggests they may have only recently migrated into the Llanos at the time of first contact with the Spanish Empire.

Archaeologist Clark Erickson summarized the early Spanish description of Baure villages:

the villages were large by Amazonian standards and were laid out in formal plans which included streets, spacious public plazas, rings of houses, and large central bebederos (communal men's houses). According to the Jesuits, many of these villages were defended through the construction of deep circular moats and wooden palisades enclosing the settlements. Settlements were connected by causeways and canals that enabled year round travel.

Early Spanish explorers in 1617 reported Llanos villages with up to 400 houses. Modern scholars have calculated that such a village would have a population of about 2000 people.

Denevan estimated the pre-Columbian population of the Llanos de Moxos at 350,000 and a population of 100,000 in 1690 when Jesuit priests first established missions in the Llanos. David Block, to the contrary, estimated only about 30,000 inhabitants of the Llanos in 1679. Whichever is more correct, the pre-Columbian population had declined due to the introduction of European diseases, the impact of conquest, and Spanish and Portuguese slave raids. In 1720, the Jesuits in the Llanos counted approximately 30,000 residents in their missions. The population of the Llanos remained fairly stable after that until the nineteenth century.

== See also ==
- Upano Valley sites
