= Canichana language =

Extinct language of Bolivia

Canichana
- Native to: Bolivia
- Region: Beni Department
- Ethnicity: Canichana people
- Extinct: 1990s 3 semispeakers (2004)
- Language family: Language isolate

Official status
- Official language in: Bolivia

Language codes
- ISO 639-3: caz
- Glottolog: cani1243
- ELP: Canichana
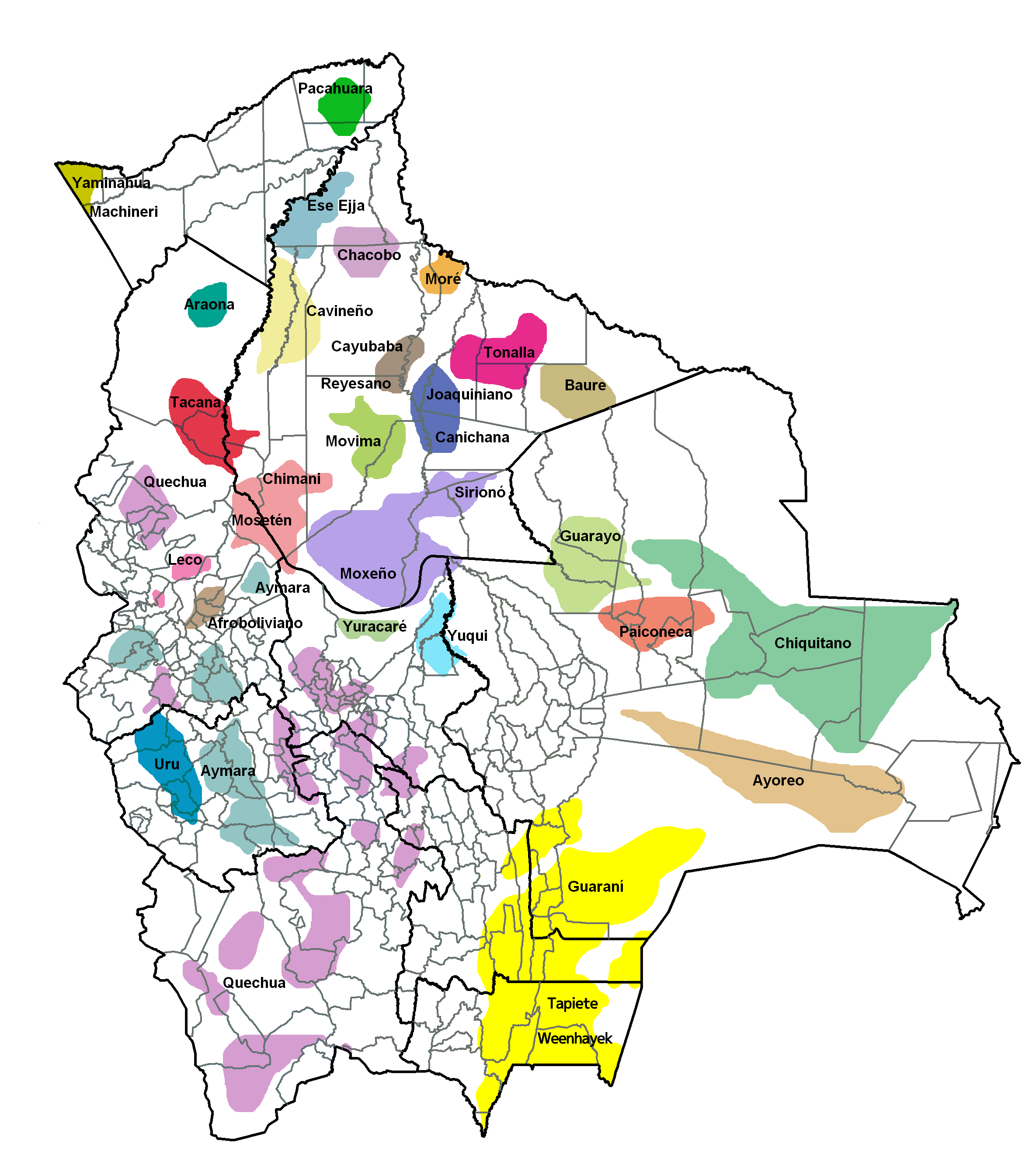
- Historical distribution of the language

- Canichana is classified as Extinct by the UNESCO Atlas of the World's Languages in Danger.

Canichana, or Canesi, is a possible language isolate of Bolivia (department of Beni). In 1991 there were 500 Canichana people, but only 20 spoke the Canichana language; by 2000 the ethnic population was 583, but the language had no mother tongue speakers left. It was spoken on the Mamoré River and Machupo River.

== Current situation ==
The Canichana territory is part of the region historically known as Moxos (or Mojos), which covers approximately 200,000 square kilometers of what is now the department of Beni. According to data provided in Crevels and Muysken (2009:15), based on the 2001 Census, the Canichana population at that time amounted to 404 members. During the research conducted by Crevels between 1999 and 2001, the author could only find three elders who still remembered some single words and phrases in Kanichana. Regarding the ethnic group, Crevels notes that the Canichanas are mainly engaged in agriculture, with their main agricultural products being cassava, corn, rice, beans and plantains. Part of the harvest is for self-consumption and the other part for local sale. Hunting, fishing and gathering are complementary traditional activities, in addition to the sale of their labor as laborers on the ranches.

== Classification ==
Despite tentative proposals to classify the language, it is generally considered a language isolate or an unclassified language.

== Phonology ==
Canichana vowels
	Front	Mid	Back
High	i		u
Central	e		o
Low		a	

Canichana consonants
		Bilabial		Alveolar		Postalveolar		Palatal		Velar		Glottal	
		voiceless	voiced	voiceless	voiced	voiceless	voiced	voiceless	voiced	voiceless	voiced	voiceless	voiced
Plosive	Plain	p	b	t	d					k	g	ʔ	
Plosive	Ejective	(pʼ)		(tʼ)						(kʼ)			
Affricate	Plain			t͡s		t͡ʃ							
Affricate	Ejective					(t͡ʃʼ)							
Fricative	Plain			s		ʃ						h	
Fricative	Lateral				ɫ								
Nasal			m		n								
Lateral					l				ʎ				
Liquid					r								
Semivowel			w						j				

== Morphology ==
As far as nominal morphology is concerned, non-human nouns seem to carry the suffix -ni, which probably indicates the non-possessed form of the noun. For example, the nouns ni-chi 'smoke', ni-chuku 'fire', and ni-platsu 'flower'. Some adjectives also carry the prefix -ni, e.g. ni'-tatila 'canine', nĩ'-bla'su 'boy, small'. Nouns not bearing this prefix are those referring to kinship terms and body parts, which are always inalienable nouns bearing a personal prefix; for example: the nouns eu-tana 'my mother' and eu-nimara 'my heart'. As far as number is concerned, the plural is expressed by the suffix -na, e.g. santo-na 'saints'.

As for verbal morphology, it can only be noted that the main arguments S and A of the first and second person are obligatorily marked in the verb. The personal prefixes S/A seem to be derived from the free personal pronouns and can also appear in nouns as possessive markers, as observed in (1).

Eu-tarpa eu-ja-tissi Dios
1SG-love 1SG-HON-father God
I love God (lit. I love my father God)

As for the negation, it seems that this is not marked in the predicate but is only expressed through the negative particle nihuas, which is placed before the predicate, as observed in (2):

Nihuas e-massota en-copphurúnue
NEG 1SG-understand 2SG-language
I don't understand your language

== Syntax ==
As in neighboring languages, it seems that the only obligatory element in the Canichana clause is the predicate, which generally precedes the subject and complements, as seen in (3):

E-massota en-copphurúnue
1SG-understand 2SG-language
I understand your language

Interrogative pronouns always appear in the initial position of the phrase, as seen in (4):

Lava an-ja-chi?
where 2SG-go-*
Where are you going?

In the noun phrase, the adjectives follow the core noun, as seen in (5):

nérahua mátihi
banana ripe
ripe banana

== Language contact ==
Jolkesky (2016) notes that there are lexical similarities with the Mochica language due to contact.

== Vocabulary ==
gloss	Canichana
head	eu-cucu
eye	eu-tot
ear	eu-comete
breast	ee-meni
person	enacu
tree	ni-yiga
leaf	em-tixle
fire	ni-chucu
stone	ni-cumchi
earth	ni-chix
eat	alema
I	oxale
you	inahali

== See also ==
- Llanos de Moxos (archaeology)
