= Huacaraje =

- Location of Huacaraje town in Bolivia
- Coordinates: 13°33′S 63°45′W
- Country: Bolivia
- Department: Beni Department
- Province: Iténez Province
- Municipality: Huacaraje Municipality

Population (2009)
  - Total: 2,882
- Time zone: UTC-4 (BOT)

Huacaraje is a town in the Iténez Province, Beni Department, in northern Bolivia. It is the capital of Huacaraje Municipality.

Huacaraje is the seat of administration of the same name at the Municipio Huacaraje Iténez province and lies at an altitude of 148 meters on the right bank of the Rio Lopez, part of the river system of the river Iténez. Huacaraje is located 50 km southeast of the provincial capital of Magdalena and 200 kilometers northeast of Trinidad, the department's capital.

== Geography and climate ==
The climate in the region is characterized by a typical tropical temperature curve with only minor fluctuations, and an annual mean temperature of about 27 °C. The annual rainfall is over 1,400 mm, with a clear rainy season from November to March and a dry season from June to August.

== Transport network ==
Huacaraje is connected to the city of Trinidad, the department's capital by the highway Ruta 9 and from La Esperanza to San Ramón.

It is served by Huacaraje Airport.

== Population ==
The population of the town has increased over the decade by about 20% by 2342 inhabitants (2001 census) to an estimated in 2882 inhabitants (est. 2009)
