= Parapetí River =

Parapetí River Rio Parapetí
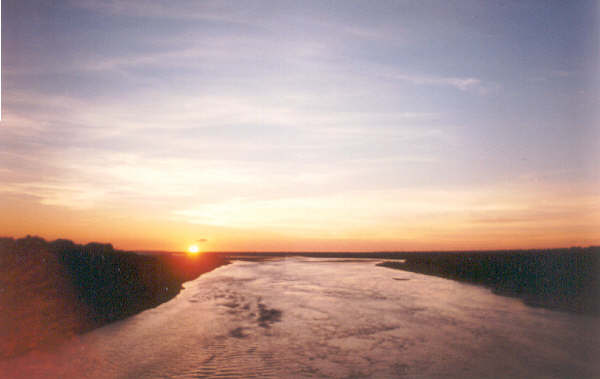

Location
- Country: Bolivia

Physical characteristics
- Source
  - location: Comunidad Rodeo, Chuquisaca Department, Bolivia
  - coordinates: 20°08′48″S 64°15′11″W
  - elevation: 1,485 m (4,872 ft)
- Mouth
  - location: Bañados de Izozog, Santa Cruz Department, Bolivia
  - coordinates: 18°02′26″S 61°38′40″W
  - elevation: 283 m (928 ft)
- Length: 500 km (310 mi)
- Basin size: 61,903 km^{2} (23,901 sq mi)
- Discharge
  - average: 80 m^{3}/s (2,800 cu ft/s)

Ramsar Wetland
- Official name: Bañados del Izozog y el río Parapetí
- Designated: 17 September 2001
- Reference no.: 1087

The Parapetí River is a river in Bolivia that has its source on the eastern side the Andes, flows through the Gran Chaco of Bolivia and ends in the marshes of the Bañados de Izozog depression. The drainage basin is 25,300 km^{2}, and with the inclusion of the Bañados of Izozog is 61,903 km^{2}.

== River course ==
The Parapetí River arises in the southeastern part of the Cordillera Central of Bolivia. It is formed by the confluence of four rivers, first the Portuguese River (Rio Portuguesa) and the Caravallo (Caraballo) River come together at 20°08′48″S 64°15′11″W. Within five kilometers thereafter it is joined by the Misco Mayu River from the right (south) and the Fernandez River from the left (north), whereafter it is known as the Parapetí. Its longest tributary, the western fork of the Caravallo River arises at an altitude of 2,679 m on the northeastern slopes of Tihu Kasa mountain, a summit about seven kilometers northeast of Torrecillas, the administrative centre of Las Casas Canton, Azurduy Municipality, Azurduy Province. After being joined by the Fernandez River at Comunidad Rodeo, the Parapetí flows south between the Serrania Alto Fernandez on the west and the Serrania Recete (Serrania Racete) on the east. At 20°20' South latitude it turns east and cuts through the Serrania Recete, meandering past San Juan del Pirai. At San Pablo de Huacareta the Parapetí turns northeast until it is joined by the Rio El Banado from the left (north), and turns generally eastward through Luis Calvo Province, and into the Cordillera Province of Santa Cruz Department. Once in Cordillera Province it turns northeast again forming the southern boundary of Lagunillas Municipality, then turns east into Camiri Municipality, cutting through the Serrania Choreti, past the town of Choreti. The Parapetí then turns south-southeast to the border between Camiri Municipality and Charagua Municipality, where it turns east and then northeast forming the eastern half of the southern border of Camiri Municipality. After the village of Oquita, the Parapetí River enters the Gran Chaco, flows east past San Antonio del Parapeti, and then northeast and then north into the marshes of the Bañados de Izozog.

=== Bañados del Izozog ===
The wetland of the Bañados del Izozog in the Bolivian department of Santa Cruz receives most of its water from the Parapetí River, but also has other smaller tributaries from a predominantly western direction. Much of the water in the Bañados del Izozog eventually evaporates due to the high year-round temperatures. However, in wet years during the rainy season, the marshes overflow and drain into both the Quimome River which flows into Concepción Lake, and via the Itonomas River into the Amazon River, and a large proportion via surface flow and infiltration takes a southeasterly direction and enters the catchment area of the Paraguay River in the Río de la Plata Basin.

On 17 September 2001, the wetlands of the Parapetí River and the Bañados del Izozog were designated under the Ramsar Convention and received international protection. Part of the wetlands was included within the Kaa-Iya del Gran Chaco National Park and Integrated Management Natural Area.
