= List of national parks of Bolivia =

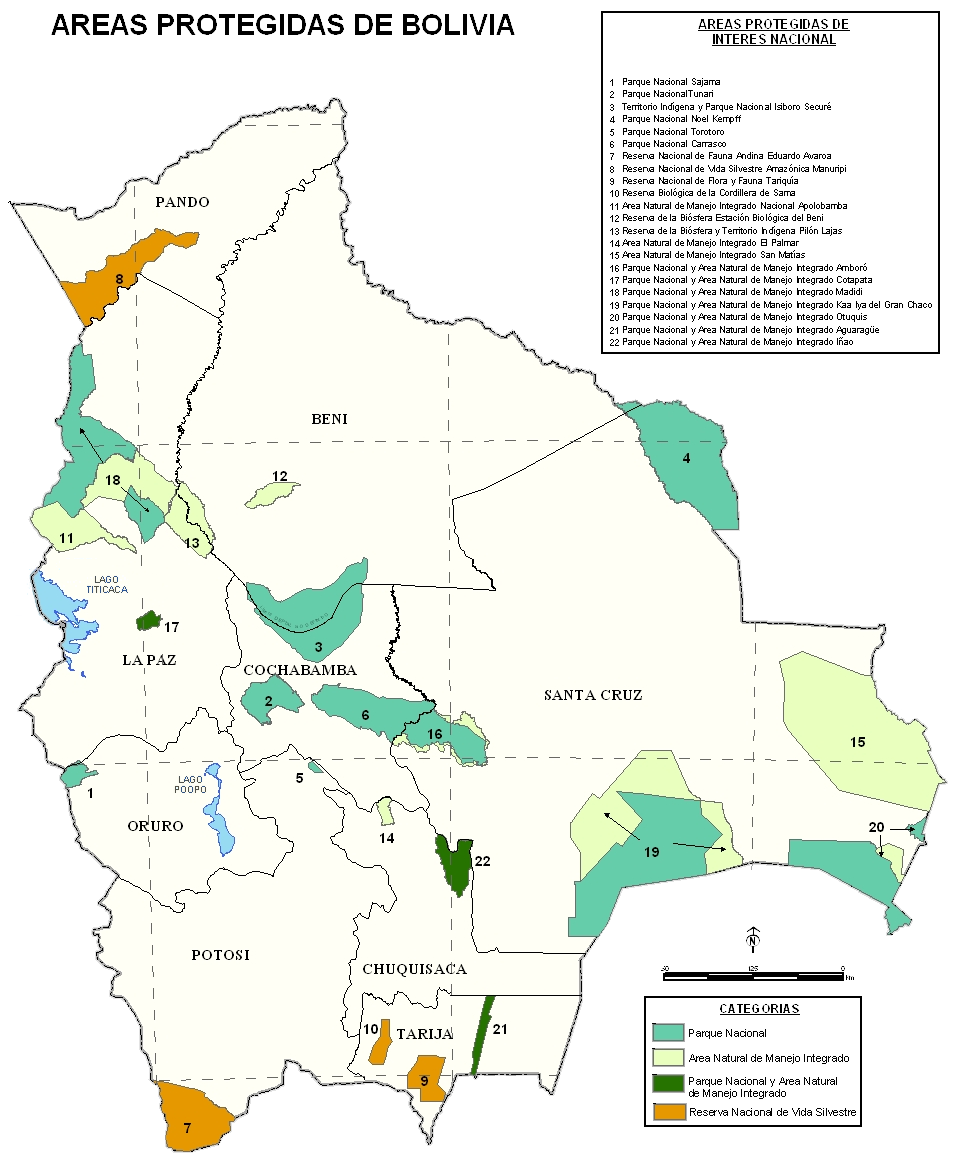
Map of protected areas of Bolivia

Bolivia has a system of protected areas that includes national parks and integrated management natural areas. The following tables list these protected areas, including their location by department, total area, and year of establishment.

Status as of 2008:

Name	Photo	Location	Area	Established
Carrasco		Cochabamba Department	6,226 km^{2} (2,404 sq mi)	1991
Isiboro Sécure		Beni Department	13,721.80 km^{2} (5,298 sq mi)	1965
Noel Kempff Mercado		Santa Cruz Department	15,234 km^{2} (5,882 sq mi)	1979
Sajama		Oruro Department	1,002 km^{2} (387 sq mi)	1939
Torotoro		Potosí Department	165.7 km^{2} (64 sq mi)	1989
Tunari		Cochabamba Department	3,090.91 km^{2} (1,193 sq mi)	1978

== National Parks and Integrated Management Natural Areas ==
Name	Photo	Location	Area	Established
Aguaragüe		Tarija Department	458.22 km^{2} (177 sq mi)	2000
Amboró		Santa Cruz Department	4,425 km^{2} (1,709 sq mi)	1973
Cotapata		La Paz Department	600 km^{2} (232 sq mi)	1993
Iñao		Chuquisaca Department	2,630.9 km^{2} (1,016 sq mi)	2004
Kaa-Iya del Gran Chaco		Santa Cruz Department	34,411 km^{2} (13,286 sq mi)	1995
Madidi		La Paz Department	18,957.5 km^{2} (7,320 sq mi)	1995
Otuquis National Park		Santa Cruz Department	10,059 km^{2} (3,884 sq mi)	1997
Serranías de Ig'embe		Chuquisaca Department	1,223.13 km^{2} (472 sq mi)	2020

== See also ==
- List of national parks (international)
