= Rana criolla =

Rana criolla literally means "Creole frog". It is a common name of some Leptodactylus frogs in Spanish-speaking countries, namely:

- Leptodactylus chaquensis
- Leptodactylus ocellatus
