= Baures Municipality =

Coordinates: 13.5°S 62.8333°W

- Municipality
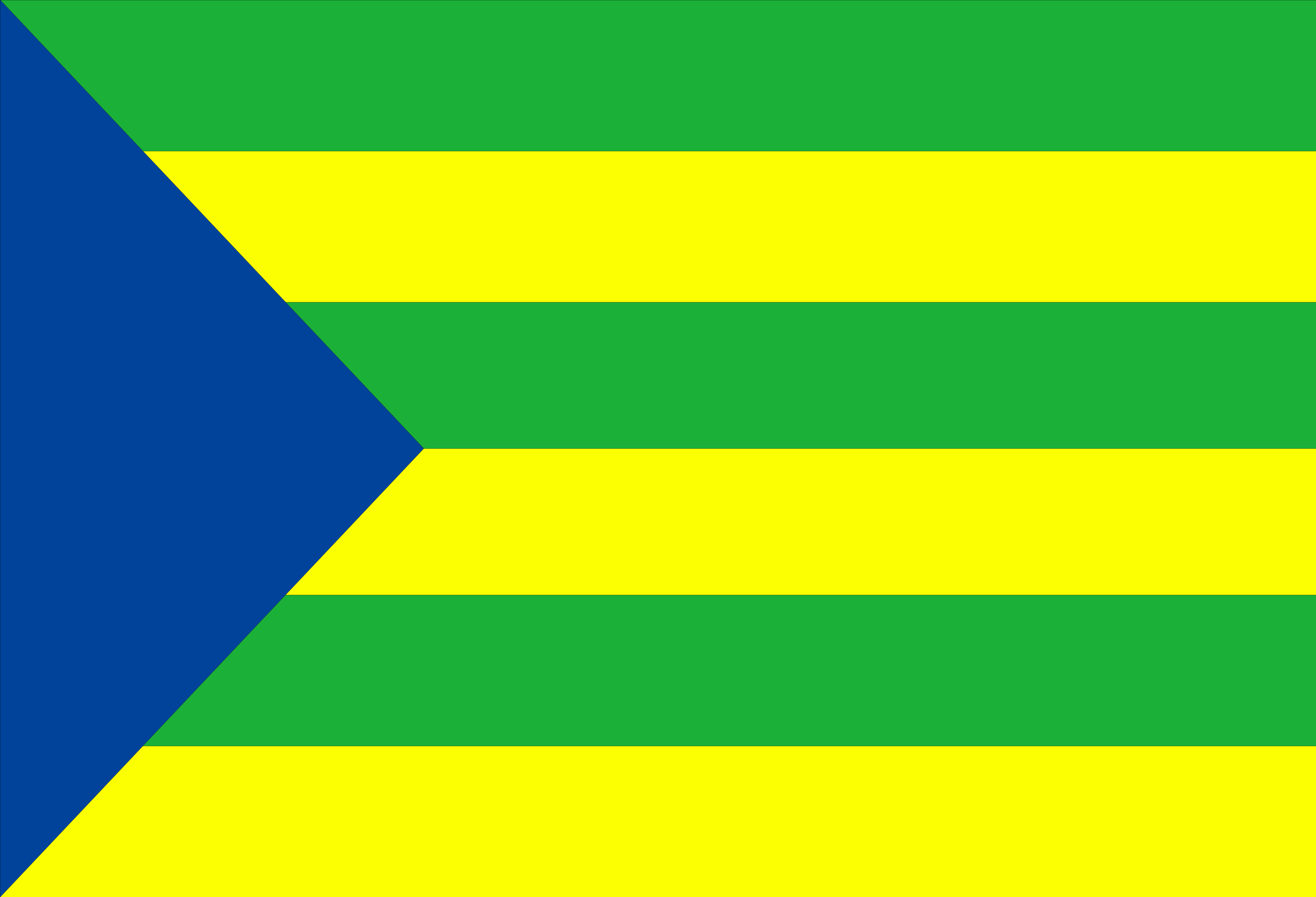
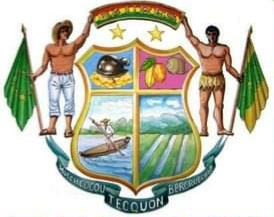
- Flag Coat of arms
- Interactive map of Baures Municipality
- Country: Bolivia
- Department: Beni Department
- Province: Iténez Province

Population (2012)
  - Total: 5,965
- Time zone: UTC-4 (BOT)

Baure residents photographed on the banks of the Blanco River in 1909.

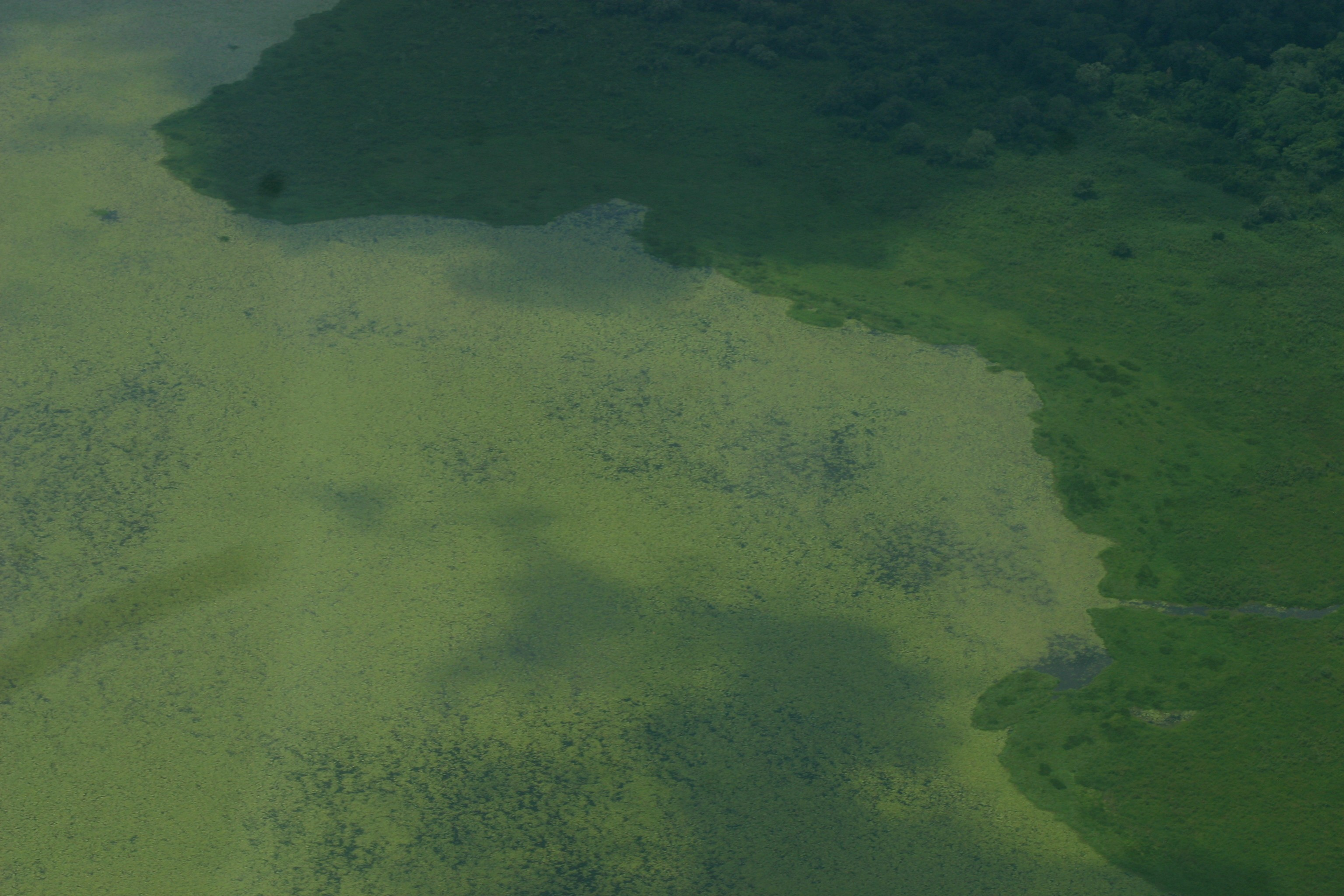
Aerial view of the Kenneth Lee Scientific, Ecological and Archaeological Reserve.

Baures is a town and municipality in Bolivia, located in the Iténez Province within the Beni Department. The municipality covers an area of 16,000 km² and has a population of 5,965 according to the 2012 INE Census.

A small part of the Noel Kempff Mercado National Park, established in 1979, is located in the eastern part of the municipality.

== History ==
Baures was founded as a Jesuit mission called Concepción by Father Lorenzo Legarda in 1708, as part of the Jesuit Missions of Moxos.

== Location ==
It is situated at an altitude of 150 meters above sea level on the left bank of the Río Negro, a tributary of the Río Iténez. Baures is located 70 kilometers southeast of the provincial capital Magdalena and 200 kilometers northeast of the departmental capital, Trinidad.

== Geography ==
The area is known for being home to the Kenneth Lee Scientific, Ecological, and Archaeological Reserve. The climate is tropical with a balanced temperature and minor variations; the average annual temperature is around 27°C. Annual precipitation exceeds 1,400 mm, marked by a wet season from November to March and a dry season from June to August.

The Serranía de San Simón, located at the eastern edge of the municipality, is noted for its veins of gold, manganese, and precious stones.

== Demography ==
The population is primarily composed of the Baure ethnic group and other local ethnic groups. According to the 2012 Bolivian census, the population of Baures in 2012 was 5,965, of which 2,127 lived in the urban area.
