= Serranías de Ig'embe Integrated Management Natural Area =

- Área Natural de Manejo Integrado Municipal Serranías de Igüembe
- Location: Bolivia; Department of Chuquisaca, Luis Calvo Province
- Nearest city: Villa Vaca Guzmán
- Area: 122,313 ha (472.25 sq mi)
- Established: 2020

Serranías de Ig'embe Integrated Management Natural Area is a protected area in the Department of Chuquisaca, Luis Calvo Province, Bolivia. It is characterized by the mountainous landscape brought on by the Cordillera Oriental mountain range. There are 7 communities of the Guaraní people, alongside an additional 7 villages.

== Creation ==
This protected area was created in 2020 due to the passing of a municipal law (No. 094/2020) by the nearby town of Villa Vaca Guzmán, which converted 122,313 hectares of its forests into protected land. The protection of water sources, protection against illegal settlements, illegal logging and illegal hunting were described as the reasons for the creation in 2020.
