= Magdalena Airport =

- IATA: MGD; ICAO: SLMG

Summary
- Airport type: Public
- Serves: Magdalena, Bolivia
- Elevation AMSL: 463 ft / 141 m
- Coordinates: 13°15′25″S 64°03′45″W

Map
- Location of Magdalena Airport in Bolivia

Runways
Direction	Length		Surface
Direction	m	ft	Surface
17/35	1,560	5,118	Grass
- Source: Landings.com Google Maps GCM

Magdalena Airport (IATA: MGD, ICAO: SLMG) is an airport serving Magdalena, a town on the Itonomas River in the Beni Department of Bolivia.

The runway is on the western edge of the town. The Magdalena non-directional beacon (Ident: MGD) is located on the field.

== See also ==
- Transport in Bolivia
- List of airports in Bolivia
