= BVK =

BVK can refer to:

- BVK - Bundesverband Kamera - German Society of Cinematographers
- Huacaraje Airport (IATA: BVK), Huacaraje, Bolivia
- Buckland Airport (FAA LID: BVK), Buckland, Alaska, United States
- Brasse Vannie Kaap, South African hip-hop group
