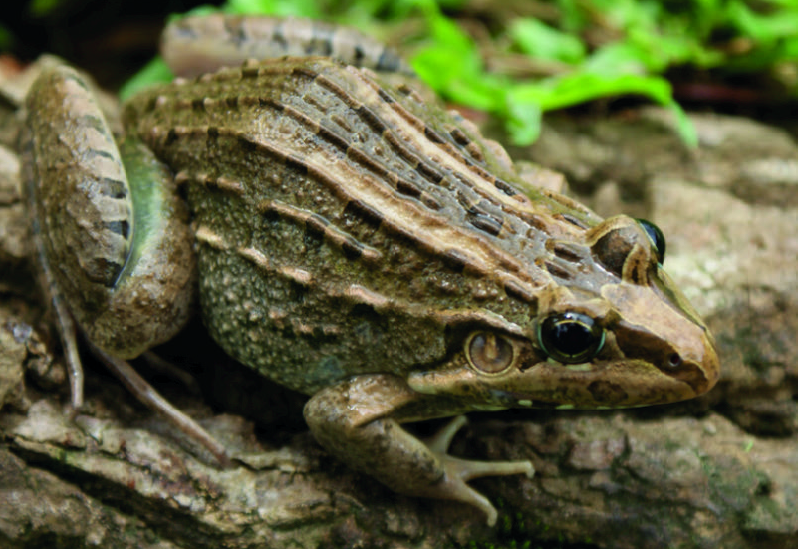
- Amapá, Brazil

Conservation status
- Least Concern (IUCN 3.1)

Scientific classification
- Kingdom: Animalia
- Phylum: Chordata
- Class: Amphibia
- Order: Anura
- Family: Leptodactylidae
- Genus: Leptodactylus
- Species: L. macrosternum

Binomial name
- Leptodactylus macrosternum Miranda-Ribeiro, 1926

Synonyms
- Leptodactylus ocellatus var. typica Cei, 1948; Leptodactylus chaquensis Cei, 1950

= Leptodactylus macrosternum =

Species of amphibian

Leptodactylus macrosternum is a species of frogs in the family Leptodactylidae. It is found in northern Argentina and adjacent eastern Bolivia, Paraguay, northern Uruguay, and southern and western Brazil. The specific name chaquensis refers to the area of Gran Chaco in Argentina. The common names Cei's white-lipped frog and Miranda's white-lipped frog have been coined for it, although this particular species lacks the light upper lip stripe common in the genus.

== Description ==
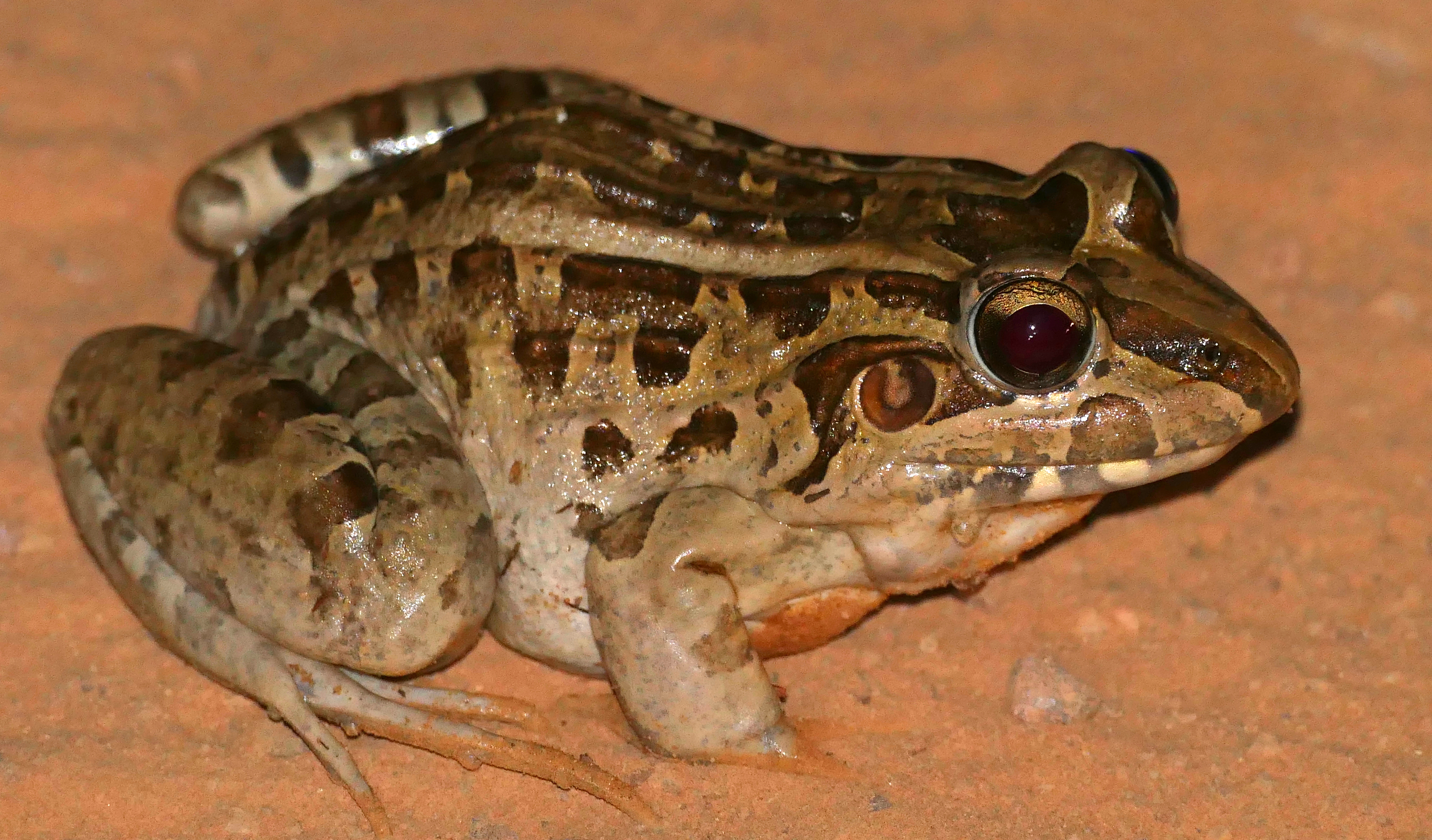
Mato Grosso, Brazil

Adult males measure 65–94 mm (2.6–3.7 in) and adult females 69–98 mm (2.7–3.9 in) in snout–vent length. No light upper lip stripe is present. The dorsum and the flanks have several well-developed pairs of skin folds. Toes have lateral fringes.

Sexually active males have a pair of keratinized thumb spines. They have three distinct advertisement calls: growls, grunts, and trills, of which the first one is the most frequent.

Tadpoles of Gosner stage 36 measure 42 mm (1.7 in) in total length.

== Habitat and conservation ==
Leptodactylus macrosternum is a ground-dwelling species occurring near ponds and flooded areas at elevations below 1,000 m (3,300 ft). The eggs are deposited in large foam nests over puddles and flooded areas in shallow water (<15 cm deep). Males call from the water's edge or from within the water.

This species is common and adapts well to anthropogenic disturbance. It was once hunted for sport and is still consumed as food in Argentina, which can lead to local declines. It occurs in many protected areas, including Chaco National Park, Mburucuyá National Park, Río Pilcomayo National Park, Parque Nacional Calilegua, Limoy Biological Reserve, Iberá Reserva Natural Provincial, Noel Kempff Mercado National Park, Kaa-iya del Gran Chaco, Otuquis National Park, Parque Nacional Da Serra Da Bodoquena, Parque Nacional da Serra do Divisor, Estação Ecológica Dos Caetetus, and Parque Estadual Do Morro Do Diabo.
