= Magdalena, Beni =

- Town
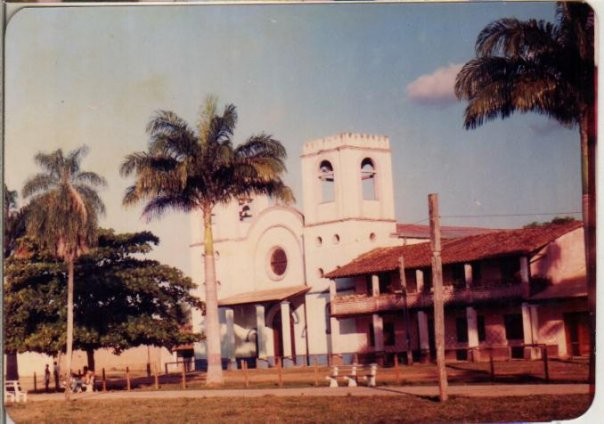
- Magdalena Mission Church in 1990

- Location of Magdalena, Beni town in Bolivia
- Coordinates: 13°15′38″S 64°03′10″W
- Country: Bolivia
- Department: Beni Department
- Province: Iténez Province
- Municipality: Magdalena Municipality
- Elevation: 466 ft (142 m)

Population (2001)
  - Total: 4,379
- Time zone: UTC-4 (BOT)
- Website: www.magdalenabeni.com

Magdalena is a town on the Itonomas River in the Beni Department in northern Bolivia, capital of the Iténez Province and the Magdalena Municipality.

It is served by Magdalena Airport.

== History ==
The Jesuit mission of Santa María Magdalena (or Santa Magdalena) was founded in 1720. Itonama people resided at the mission. Their language is now extinct.

== Climate ==
The yearly precipitation of the region is 1,600 mm, with a distinct dry season from May to September. Monthly average temperatures vary from 24 °C to 29 °C over the year. According to the Köppen classification system Magdalenas has a Tropical savanna climate, abbreviated "Aw".

Climate data for Magdalena, elevation 141 m (463 ft)
Month	Jan	Feb	Mar	Apr	May	Jun	Jul	Aug	Sep	Oct	Nov	Dec	Year
Record high °C (°F)	39.6 (103.3)	39.0 (102.2)	38.9 (102.0)	37.3 (99.1)	37.4 (99.3)	36.7 (98.1)	39.0 (102.2)	39.4 (102.9)	39.9 (103.8)	39.8 (103.6)	38.8 (101.8)	39.0 (102.2)	39.9 (103.8)
Mean daily maximum °C (°F)	31.5 (88.7)	31.2 (88.2)	31.7 (89.1)	31.8 (89.2)	30.9 (87.6)	30.8 (87.4)	31.7 (89.1)	33.4 (92.1)	33.7 (92.7)	33.7 (92.7)	32.5 (90.5)	31.8 (89.2)	32.1 (89.7)
Daily mean °C (°F)	27.0 (80.6)	26.9 (80.4)	27.1 (80.8)	26.9 (80.4)	25.6 (78.1)	24.6 (76.3)	24.4 (75.9)	25.8 (78.4)	26.9 (80.4)	27.7 (81.9)	27.2 (81.0)	27.1 (80.8)	26.4 (79.6)
Mean daily minimum °C (°F)	22.5 (72.5)	22.4 (72.3)	22.5 (72.5)	22.0 (71.6)	20.3 (68.5)	18.4 (65.1)	17.1 (62.8)	18.1 (64.6)	20.0 (68.0)	21.7 (71.1)	21.9 (71.4)	22.4 (72.3)	20.8 (69.4)
Record low °C (°F)	14.5 (58.1)	16.0 (60.8)	13.2 (55.8)	10.0 (50.0)	6.2 (43.2)	8.5 (47.3)	3.7 (38.7)	5.2 (41.4)	9.0 (48.2)	12.2 (54.0)	10.7 (51.3)	15.6 (60.1)	3.7 (38.7)
Average precipitation mm (inches)	243.6 (9.59)	237.1 (9.33)	236.7 (9.32)	118.3 (4.66)	57.0 (2.24)	19.0 (0.75)	13.4 (0.53)	23.0 (0.91)	59.6 (2.35)	126.8 (4.99)	186.3 (7.33)	220.9 (8.70)	1,541.7 (60.7)
Average precipitation days	14.9	14.1	13.0	8.0	4.8	2.1	1.5	1.9	4.2	8.0	10.0	13.0	95.5
Average relative humidity (%)	82.4	82.5	81.4	80.2	78.4	75.6	68.8	64.7	67.8	73.3	78.7	81.3	76.3
Source: Servicio Nacional de Meteorología e Hidrología de Bolivia
