= Baures Airport =

- IATA: BVL; ICAO: SLBU

Summary
- Airport type: Public
- Serves: Baures, Bolivia
- Elevation AMSL: 470 ft / 143 m
- Coordinates: 13°39′27″S 63°42′10″W

Map
- Location of the airport in Bolivia

Runways
Direction	Length		Surface
Direction	m	ft	Surface
17/35	1,440	4,724	Grass
- Sources: GCM Google Maps

Baures Airport (IATA: BVL, ICAO: SLBU) is an airport serving the village of Baures in the Beni Department of Bolivia. The runway is adjacent to the west side of the village.

== See also ==
- Transport in Bolivia
- List of airports in Bolivia
