= Irobi Airport =

Airport in Bolivia

Ibori Airport Bella Vista Airport
- IATA: none; ICAO: SLIR

Summary
- Airport type: Public
- Serves: Bella Vista, Bolivia
- Elevation AMSL: 532 ft / 162 m
- Coordinates: 13°16′10″S 63°41′30″W

Map
- Location of airport in Bolivia

Runways
Direction	Length		Surface
Direction	m	ft	Surface
17/35	1,080	3,543	Grass
- Source: Landings.com Google Maps GCM

Irobi Airport (ICAO: SLIR) is an airport serving the San Martin River town of Bella Vista, in the Beni Department of Bolivia. The runway is just east of the town.

== See also ==
- Transport in Bolivia
- List of airports in Bolivia
