= Baures =

- Location of Baures town in Bolivia
- Coordinates: 13°39′20″S 63°41′45″W
- Country: Bolivia
- Department: Beni Department
- Province: Iténez Province
- Municipality: Baures Municipality
- Elevation: 470 ft (140 m)

Population (2012)
  - Total: 2,127
- Time zone: UTC-4 (BOT)

Baures is a village in Iténez Province, Beni Department, in northern Bolivia. It is the capital of Baures Municipality.

It is served by Baures Airport.
