= Itonomas River =

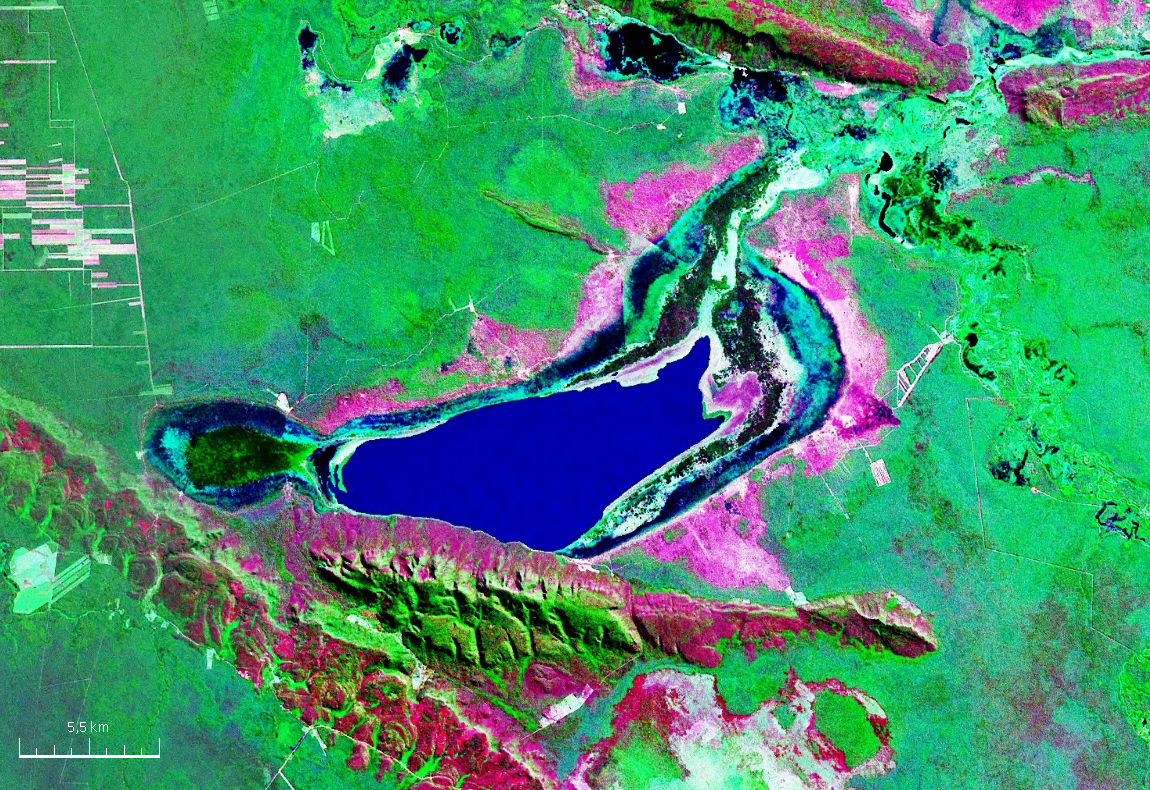
- Concepción Lake, a large lake in Santa Cruz Department that drains into the Itonomas River (at this point known as the San Julián River) near its headwaters.

Location
- Country: Bolivia

Physical characteristics
- Mouth: Machupo River
  - coordinates: 12°32′20″S 64°22′13″W
- Length: 1,493 km (928 mi)

The Itonomas River is a river of Bolivia that flows through the departments of Santa Cruz and Beni. It is a part of the Amazon River basin.

== Course ==
Originating near Concepción Lake at the confluence of the intermittent Quimome and Santa Maria Rivers as the San Julián River, the river flows northwards until it becomes the San Pablo River near the city of Ascensión de Guarayos, after which point it forms part of the border between the Beni and Santa Cruz Departments. It then continues into further north into the Beni Department, and after flowing past the small Lake El Bi, it becomes the San Luis River, a name it retains for a short distance until taking on the name Itonomas at its confluence with the Lopez River.

Despite its considerable length, the Itonomas is nominally considered to be a tributary of the shorter Machupo River, which in turn drains into the Iténez River only a short distance further downstream. Additionally, due to the situation of its headwaters at the eastern edge of the vast Bañados del Izozog, the Itonomas can be considered to be a hydrological continuation of the Parapetí River, which originates in the Bolivian Andes.

Over its course it receives tributaries such as the Quizer River.

== See also ==
- List of rivers of Bolivia
