= Huacaraje Airport =

- IATA: BVK; ICAO: SLHJ

Summary
- Airport type: Public
- Serves: Huacaraje, Bolivia
- Elevation AMSL: 453 ft / 138 m
- Coordinates: 13°36′20″S 63°52′46″W

Map
- Location of Huacaraje Airport in Bolivia

Runways
Direction	Length		Surface
Direction	m	ft	Surface
16/34	1,620	5,315	Grass
- Source: Landings.com Google Maps GCM

Huacaraje Airport (IATA: BVK, ICAO: SLHJ) is an airport adjacent to the town of Huacaraje in the Beni Department of Bolivia.

== See also ==
- Transport in Bolivia
- List of airports in Bolivia
