= Canichana people =

Ethnic group of Bolivia

Canichana
Total population
- 899 (2012)

Regions with significant populations
- Bolivia (Beni Department)

Languages
- Canichana language, Spanish

Religion
- Catholicism

The Canichana people are an ethnic group in the Beni Department of Bolivia. There were 899 of them in 2012.
