= Casarabe =

- Village
- Location of San Ignacio in Bolivia
- Coordinates: 14°51′12″S 64°28′48″W
- Country: Bolivia
- Department: Beni Department
- Province: Cercado Province
- Municipality: Trinidad Municipality
- Elevation: 554 ft (169 m)

Population (2012 Census)
  - Total: 915
- Time zone: UTC-4 (BOT)

Casarabe is a village in the Beni Department of northern Bolivia.
