= Villa Vaca Guzmán =

Coordinates: 19°53′S 63°45′W

- Town
- Interactive map of Villa Vaca Guzmán
- Country: Bolivia
- Department: Chuquisaca Department
- Province: Luis Calvo Province
- Municipality: Muyupampa Municipality
- Time zone: UTC-4 (BOT)

Villa Vaca Guzmán is a small town in Bolivia.

== Climate ==
Climate data for Villa Vaca Guzmán (Muyupampa), elevation 1,090 m (3,580 ft)
| Month | Jan | Feb | Mar | Apr | May | Jun | Jul | Aug | Sep | Oct | Nov | Dec | Year |
|---|---|---|---|---|---|---|---|---|---|---|---|---|---|
| Mean daily maximum °C (°F) | 30.3 (86.5) | 29.2 (84.6) | 28.2 (82.8) | 26.3 (79.3) | 24.4 (75.9) | 24.1 (75.4) | 25.0 (77.0) | 27.2 (81.0) | 28.7 (83.7) | 30.2 (86.4) | 30.0 (86.0) | 30.3 (86.5) | 27.8 (82.1) |
| Daily mean °C (°F) | 23.5 (74.3) | 22.8 (73.0) | 22.1 (71.8) | 20.0 (68.0) | 17.4 (63.3) | 15.6 (60.1) | 15.5 (59.9) | 17.1 (62.8) | 19.0 (66.2) | 22.0 (71.6) | 22.3 (72.1) | 23.2 (73.8) | 20.0 (68.1) |
| Mean daily minimum °C (°F) | 16.7 (62.1) | 16.5 (61.7) | 15.9 (60.6) | 13.6 (56.5) | 10.2 (50.4) | 6.9 (44.4) | 5.8 (42.4) | 6.9 (44.4) | 10.4 (50.7) | 13.8 (56.8) | 14.8 (58.6) | 15.8 (60.4) | 12.3 (54.1) |
| Average precipitation mm (inches) | 148.3 (5.84) | 122.2 (4.81) | 97.2 (3.83) | 37.2 (1.46) | 16.0 (0.63) | 5.9 (0.23) | 5.4 (0.21) | 6.0 (0.24) | 22.6 (0.89) | 49.8 (1.96) | 89.2 (3.51) | 135 (5.3) | 734.8 (28.91) |
| Average precipitation days | 8.9 | 7.7 | 7.2 | 4.8 | 4.1 | 2.1 | 1.4 | 1.3 | 2.8 | 5.4 | 7.5 | 7.8 | 61 |
| Average relative humidity (%) | 73.0 | 74.0 | 75.8 | 75.8 | 76.1 | 72.1 | 64.0 | 55.8 | 53.1 | 58.5 | 65.2 | 68.2 | 67.6 |
Source: Servicio Nacional de Meteorología e Hidrología de Bolivia
