= Magdalena Municipality, Beni =

Magdalena Municipality
- Municipality
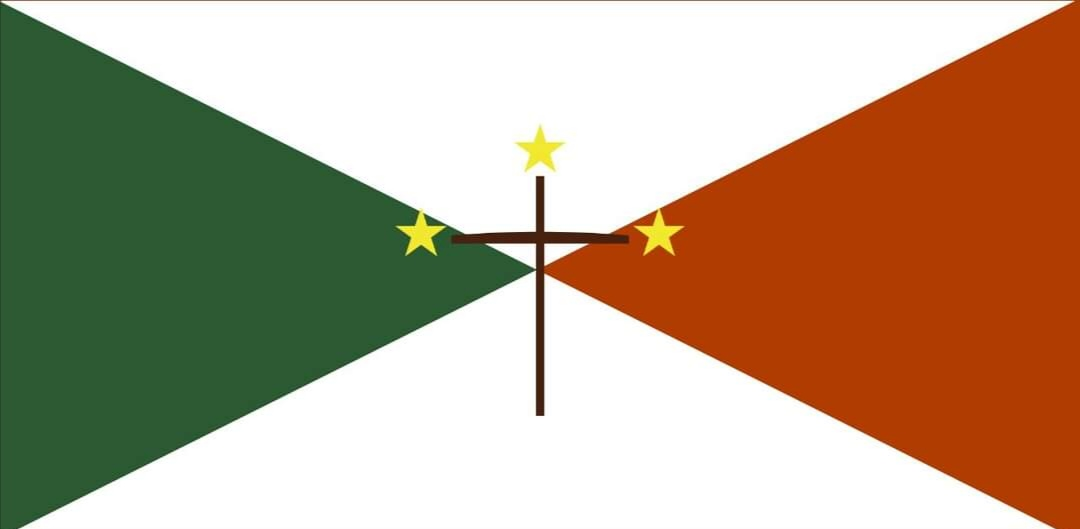
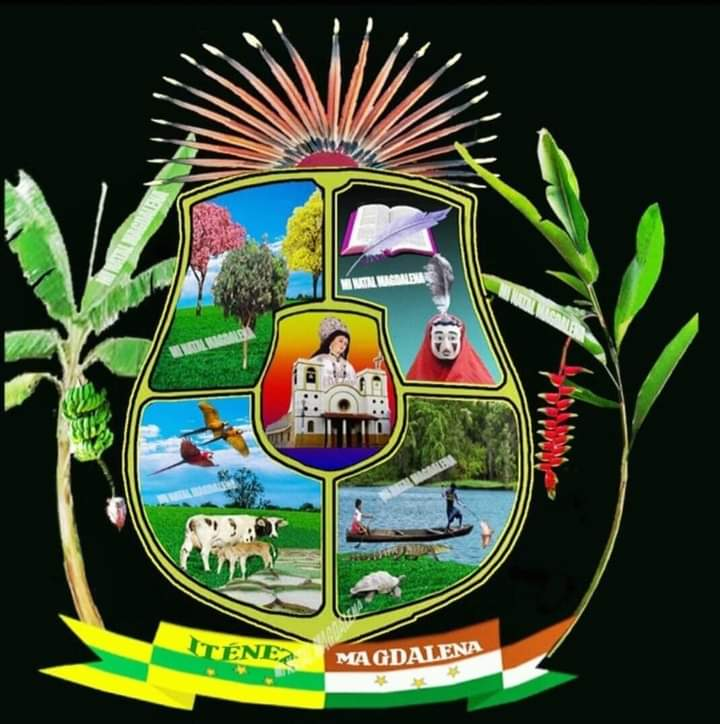
- Flag Coat of arms

- Location within Bolivia
- Coordinates: 13°00′S 63°50′W
- Country: Bolivia
- Department: Beni Department
- Province: Iténez Province
- Seat: Magdalena
- Time zone: UTC-4 (BOT)

Magdalena Municipality is the first municipal section of the Iténez Province in the Beni Department in Bolivia. Its seat is Magdalena.
