= Otuquis National Park and Integrated Management Natural Area =

National park in Bolivia

- IUCN category II (national park)
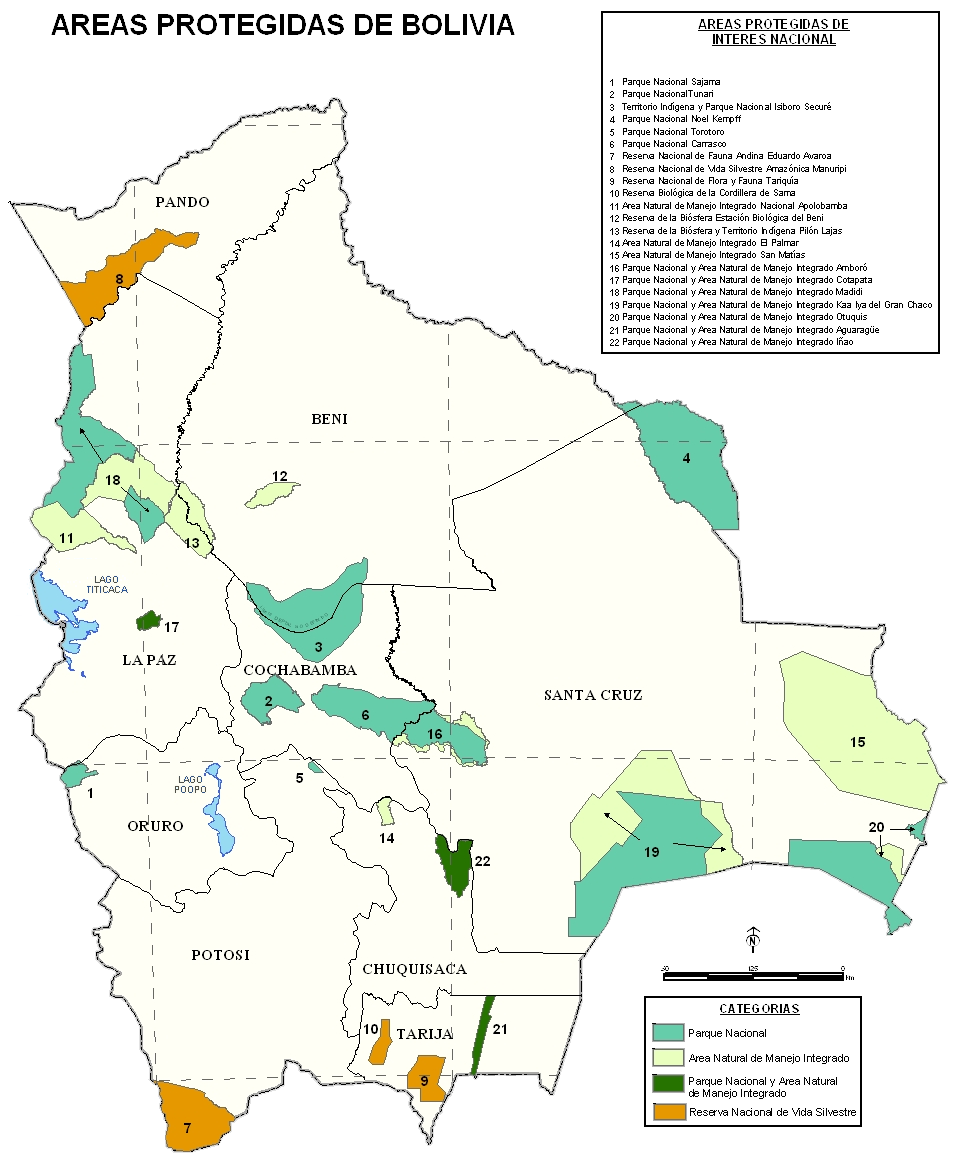
- National parks and reserves in Bolivia; Otuquis is No. 20

- Location within Bolivia
- Location: Santa Cruz Department, Bolivia
- Coordinates: 19°20′0″S 58°45′0″W
- Area: 1,005,950 ha (2,485,800 acres)
- Established: 1997

Otuquis National Park and Integrated Management Natural Area, (Parque Nacional y Área Natural de Manejo Integrado Otuquis (PN-ANMI Otuquis) or Parque Nacional y ANMI Pantanal de Otuquis), is a national park in the Pantanal ecoregion of southeastern Bolivia. It is named after the Otuke indigenous people who inhabit the region.

== Geography ==
It is located in the extreme southeast of the Santa Cruz Department on the borders with Brazil and Paraguay, within the provinces Germán Busch and Cordillera. It comprises a total area of 1,005,950 hectares (2,485,800 acres), 903,350 hectares (2,232,200 acres) corresponding to the category national park and 102,600 hectares (254,000 acres) to the category "Integrated Management Natural Area".

== Nature ==
This park is known for its sightings of marsh deer, capybara, spectacled caiman, caiman lizards and the yellow anaconda. Jaguars, pumas, pampas cats, ocelots, lesser anteaters and other mammals also found here in healthy populations. Otuquis National Park is popular for birders when millions of birds flock here to feed on huge schools of bait fish.

== See also ==
- Pantanal ecoregion topics
- List of national parks of Bolivia
