= Itonama people =

Bolivian ethnic group

- Itonama family photographed in 1914 by Erland Nordenskiöld

Total population
- 16158 (2010 census)

Languages
- Spanish, formerly Itonama

The Itonama people are an ethnic group in northeastern Bolivia. They numbered 16,158 in 2012 with 1,249 people speaking the Itonama language natively. Their language was considered to be extinct by 2023.
