= Luis Calvo =

- Province
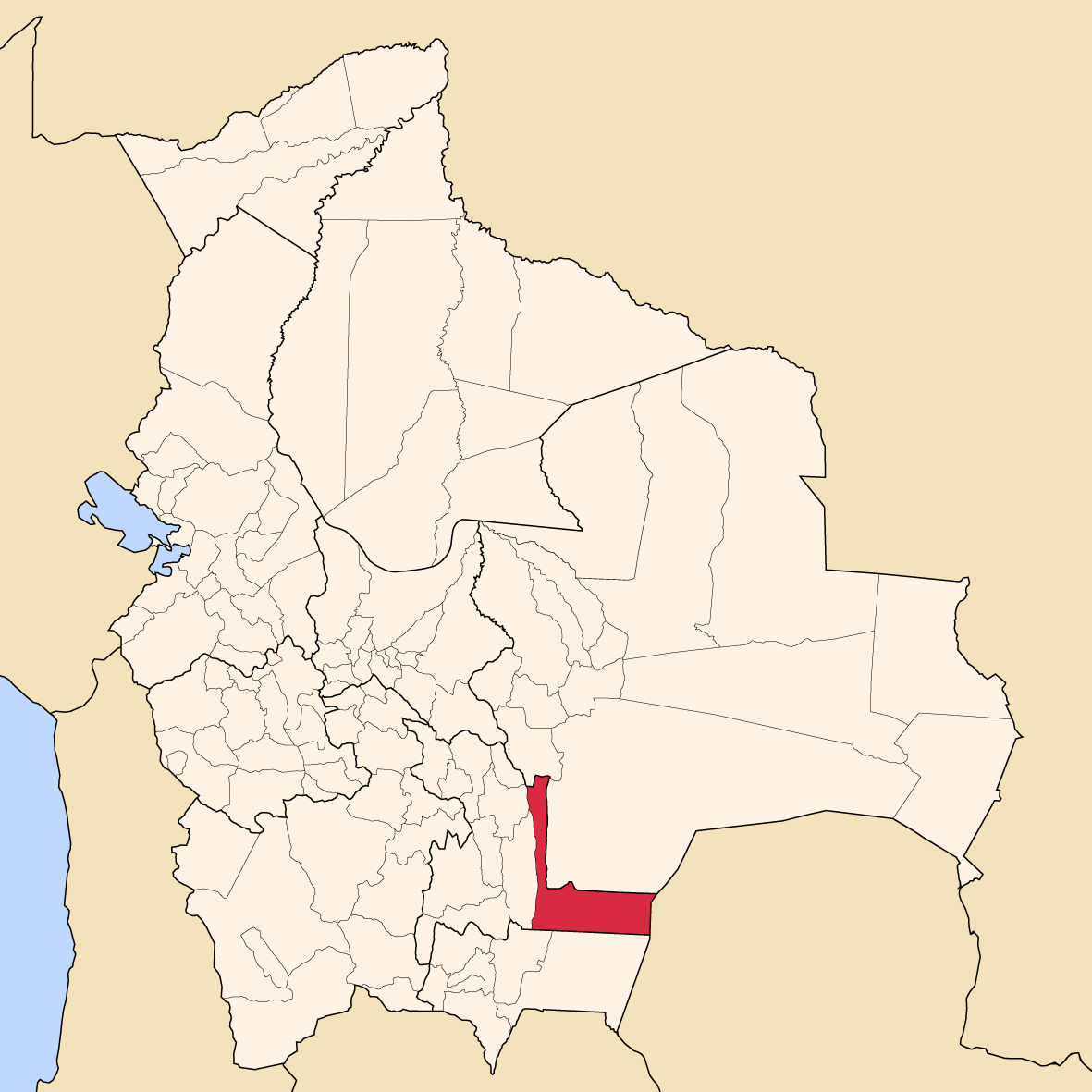
- Location of Luis Calvo Province within Bolivia
- Coordinates: 20.667°S 63.583°W
- Country: Bolivia
- Department: Chuquisaca

Area
  - Total: 12,798 km^{2} (4,941 sq mi)

Population
  - Total: 22,987
  - Density: 1.7961/km^{2} (4.6520/sq mi)
- Time zone: UTC-4 (Bolivia Time)

Luis Calvo is a province in the Bolivian department of Chuquisaca. It had a population of 22,987 as of 2024.

== Subdivision ==
The province is divided into three municipalities which are further subdivided into cantons. The municipalities with their seats are:

Section	Municipality	Seat
1st	Muyupampa Municipality / Villa Vaca Guzmán Municipality	Villa Vaca Guzmán
2nd	Huacaya Municipality	Huacaya
3rd	Macharetí Municipality	Macharetí
