= Concepción Lake =

Lake in Santa Cruz Department, Bolivia

Concepción
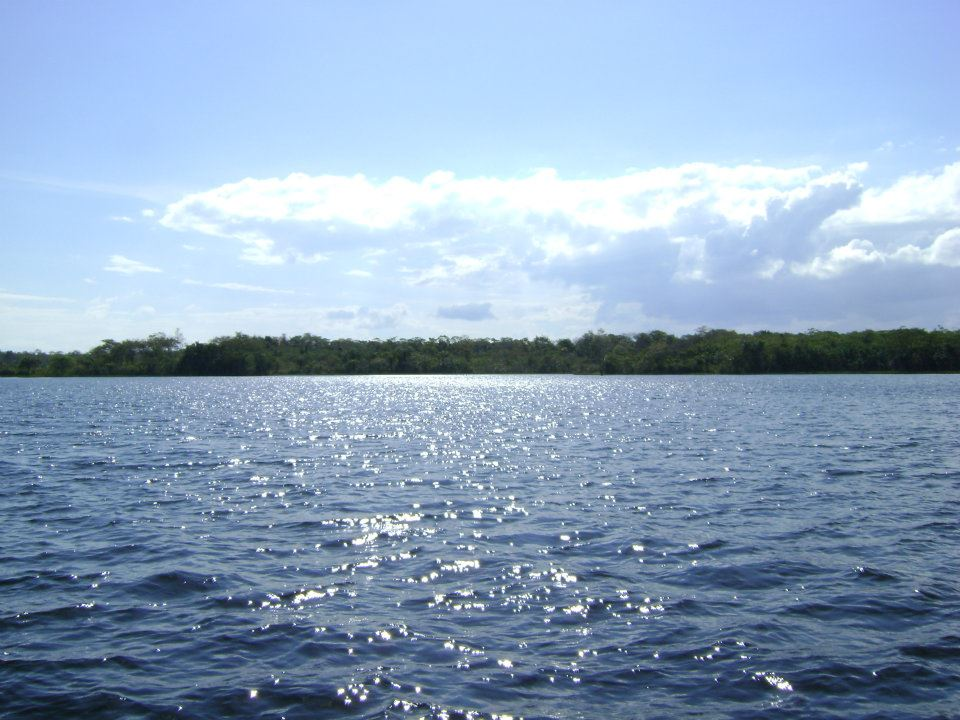
- Concepción Lake

- Location within Bolivia Location within Brazil Location within South America
- Interactive map of Concepción
- Location: Chiquitos Province, Santa Cruz Department
- Coordinates: 17°30′30″S 61°25′30″W
- Primary inflows: Quimome
- Primary outflows: San Julian, San Pablo
- Basin countries: Bolivia
- Surface area: 58 to 158 km^{2} (22 to 61 sq mi)
- Surface elevation: 248 m (814 ft)

Ramsar Wetland
- Official name: Laguna Concepción
- Designated: 6 May 2002
- Reference no.: 1175

Concepción is a lake in Chiquitos Province, Santa Cruz Department, Bolivia. At an elevation of 248 m, its surface area is 58 to 158 km^{2}.
