= Machupo River =

Coordinates: 12°27′12″S 64°22′39″W

- Location within Bolivia

Location
- Country: Bolivia
- Department: Beni Department

The Machupo River is a river in Beni Department, Bolivia, a tributary of the Amazon. It rises in the foothills of the Andes and flows east and northeast into the Guaporé River (Rio Itenez) just to the east of Forte Principe da Beira.
