= Iténez Province =

Coordinates: 13.500°S 63.333°W

Iténez
- Province
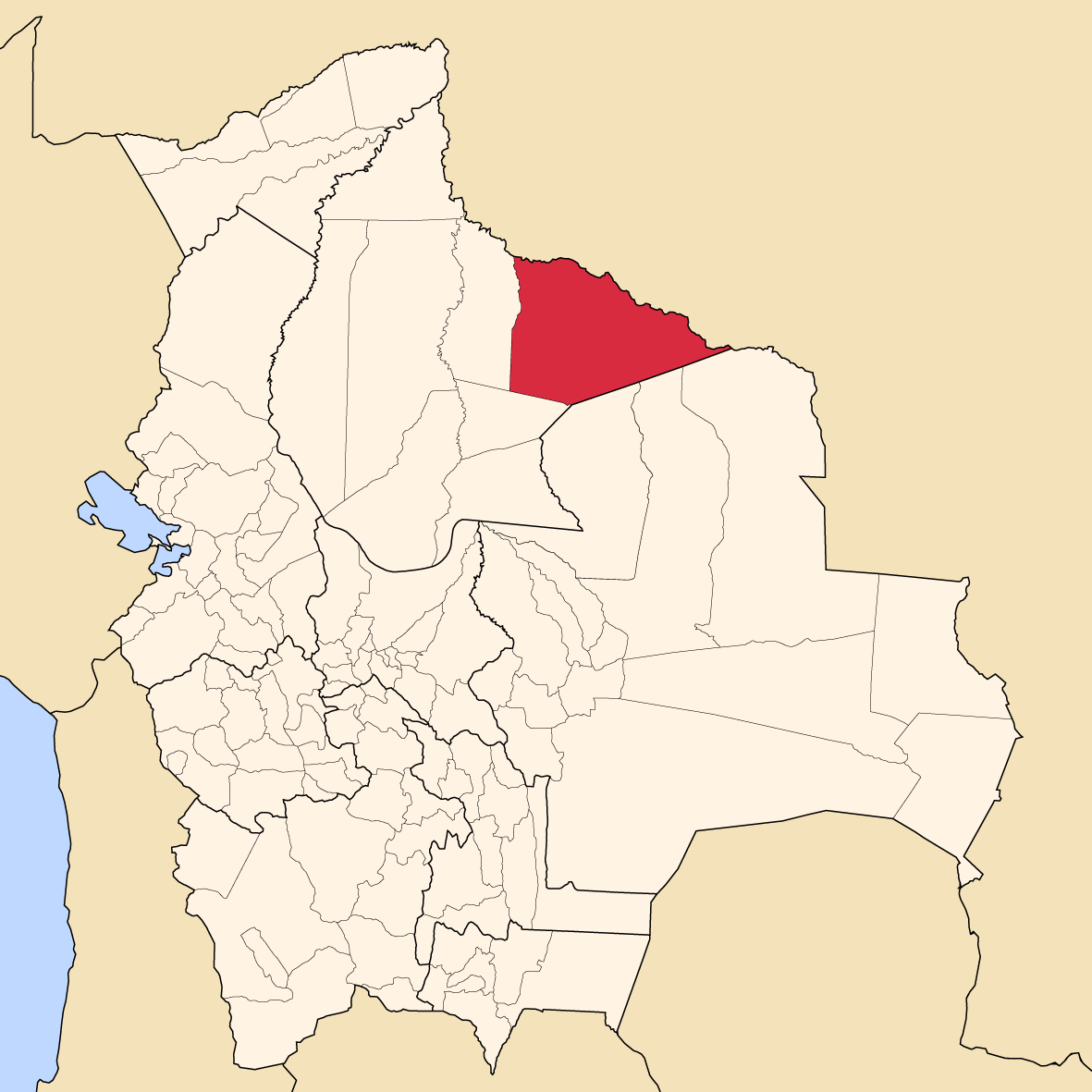
- Map of Bolivia highlighting the province of Iténez.

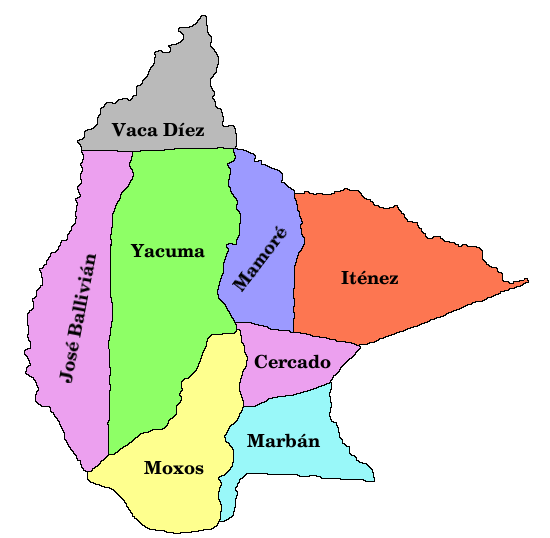
- Provinces of the Beni Department
- Country: Bolivia
- Department: Beni
- Settlements: List: Magdalena; Baures; Huacaraje

Area
  - Total: 14,122 sq mi (36,576 km^{2})

Population (2024 census)
  - Total: 23,961
  - Density: 1.6967/sq mi (0.65510/km^{2})
- Time zone: UTC-4 (BOT)

Iténez is a province in the Beni Department, Bolivia.
