= TAC Colombia =

Colombian airline

IATA	ICAO	Call sign
—	TCC	TAC
- Founded: 1995
- Hubs: Alfonso Bonilla Aragón International Airport; Enrique Olaya Herrera Airport
- Fleet size: 7
- Destinations: 10
- Headquarters: Cali, Colombia
- Website: taccolombia.com

TAC (acronym of Transporte Aéreo de Colombia) is a charter airline based at Alfonso Bonilla Aragón International Airport in Cali, Colombia.

== History ==
The airline was founded in Manizales, Caldas; as TAC (Taxi Aéreo de Caldas). In 2008, the company was renamed Transporte Aéreo de Colombia.

== Destinations ==
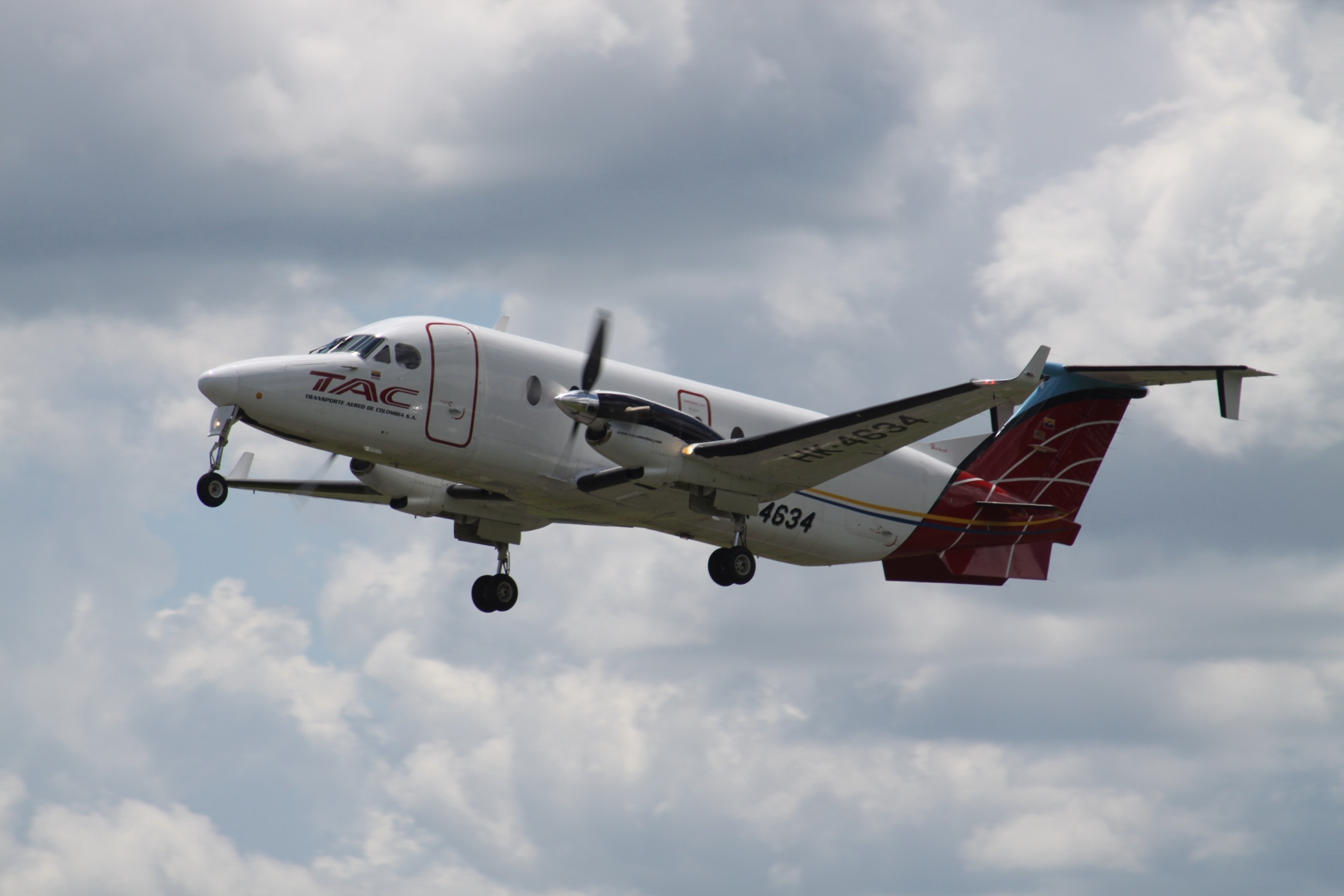
A TAC Colombia Beechcraft 1900D

Country	City	Airport	Notes/Refs
Colombia	Cali	Alfonso Bonilla Aragón International Airport	Hub
Colombia	Bogota	El Dorado International Airport	
Colombia	El Charco	El Charco Airport	
Colombia	Guapi	Guapi Airport	
Colombia	Ipiales	San Luis Airport	
Colombia	Medellin	Enrique Olaya Herrera Airport	Hub
Colombia	Pasto	Antonio Nariño Airport	
Colombia	Quidbo	El Caraño Airport	
Colombia	Timbiqui	Timbiqui Airport	
Colombia	Tumaco	La Florida Airport	

== Fleet ==
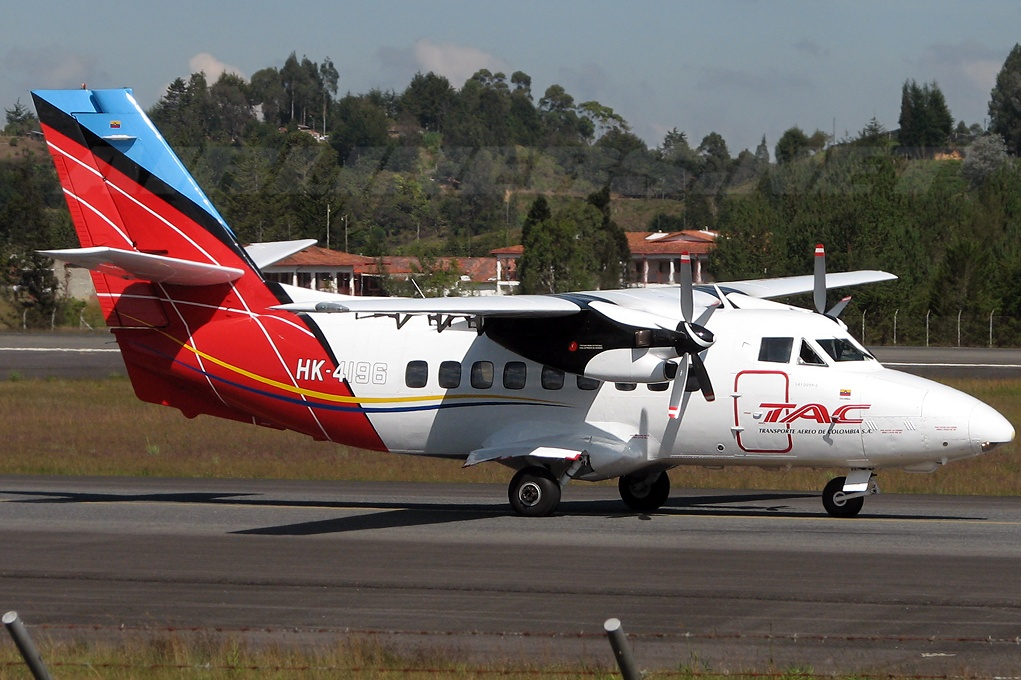
A TAC Colombia Let L-410

TAC Colombia operates the following aircraft (at September 2020):a

TAC Colombia fleet
Aircraft	Total	Orders	Passengers
Beechcraft 1900D	2 (as of August 2025)	—	19
Piper PA-31 Navajo	2	—	8
Let L-410	3	—	19
Total	7	—	

TAC Colombia are also looking at getting Embraer Phenom 300's in the future.

== Accidents and incidents ==
- On 14 December 1977, Vickers Viscount HK-1267 was damaged beyond repair at Palo Negro International Airport, Bucaramanga.
- On 26 June 2009, a TAC LET-410 UVP overran the runway upon landing at Capurganá Airport, Chocó. All 21 survived; 3 crew, 18 passengers.
