= LATAM Airlines Colombia =

Airline of Colombia

IATA	ICAO	Call sign
4C	ARE	LAN COLOMBIA
- Founded: 2 October 1980; 46 years ago(as AIRES)
- Commenced operations: 3 December 2011; 14 years ago (as LAN Colombia); 5 May 2016; 10 years ago (as LATAM Colombia)
- Hubs: Bogotá
- Focus cities: Medellín–JMC
- Frequent-flyer program: LATAM Pass
- Fleet size: 36
- Destinations: 21
- Parent company: LATAM Airlines Group
- Headquarters: Bogotá, Colombia
- Key people: Santiago Alvarez (CEO)
- Website: www.latam.com/es_co

LATAM Airlines Colombia (formerly known as LAN Colombia) is a Colombian airline based in El Dorado International Airport in Bogotá. It is the second-largest air carrier in Colombia, after Avianca. It operates scheduled regional domestic passenger services, as well as a domestic cargo service. Its main hub is El Dorado International Airport in Bogotá.

== History ==
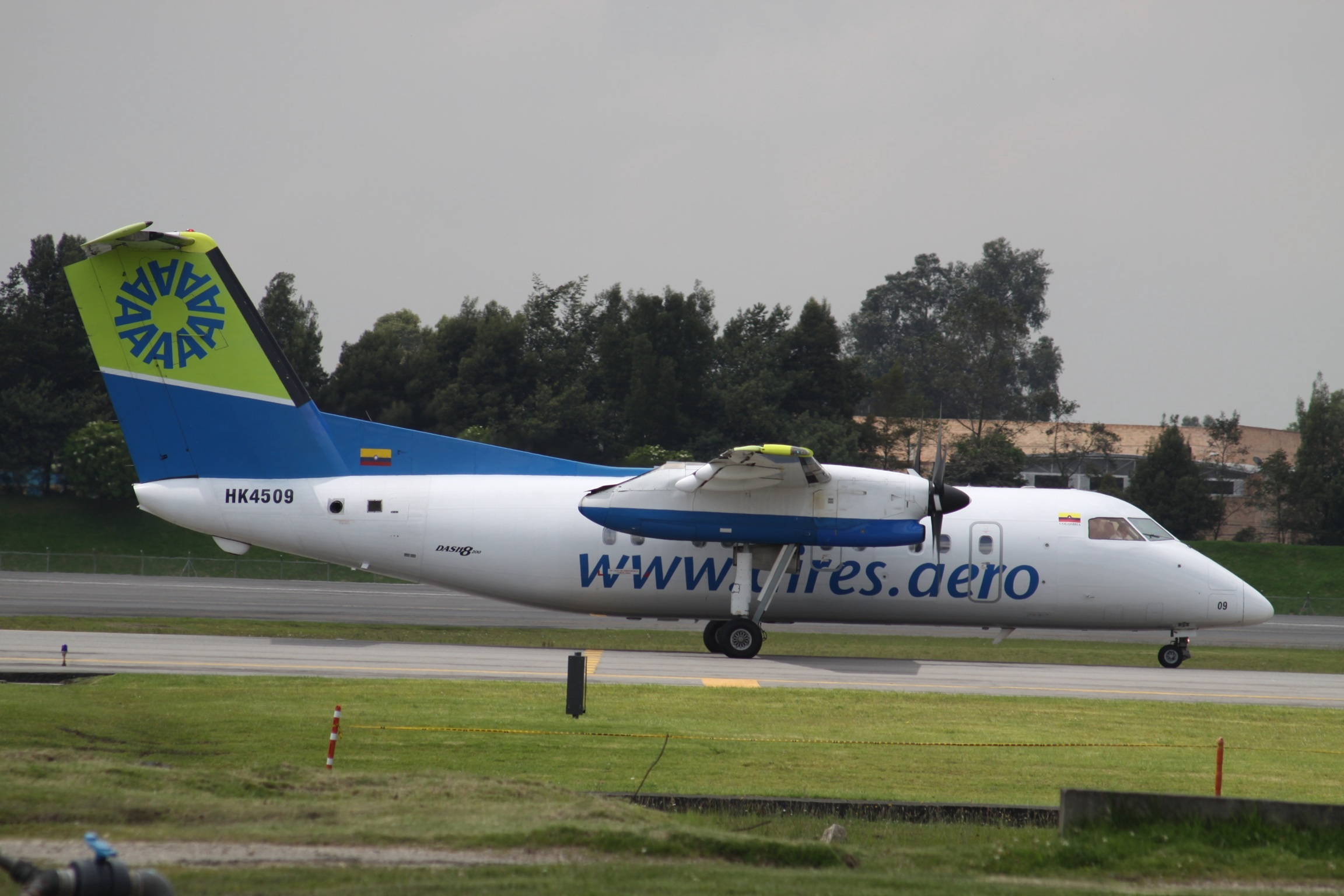
A former AIRES Bombardier Dash 8 Q200 taxiing at El Dorado International Airport in 2011

The airline was founded on 2 October 1980 as AIRES, starting operations on 23 February 1981, with a few small planes, until they acquired some Embraer 110 Bandeirante and Fairchild F27. In 1990, the airline registered a 9% decrease in passenger transport.

With the rise of competition with AeroRepública in November 1992, AIRES made small expansions, mostly adding service to the neighboring countries of Venezuela and Ecuador.

In November 1998, the airline began its coverage in the Caribbean Region, opening a base of operations in Barranquilla, from where flights began to: Cartagena, Santa Marta, Valledupar, Corozal among other cities in the north of the country.

On 13 December 2000, the airline began its internationalization with the opening of the Barranquilla-Oranjestad, Aruba route, flying twice a week, later it began operations to Willemstad, Curaçao.

In 2004, the company made a corporate image change, as well as a change in the stationery, said the investment had a cost of close to 1,000 million pesos.

In 2009, with the beginning of the trunk routes, a new era began and thus rubbed shoulders with Avianca and AeroRepública, and this was done by incorporating Jet aircraft and breaking the tariff scheme by becoming a low-cost airline.

On 28 October 2010, it was announced that 98% of the shares in the previous airline AIRES had been acquired by Chilean carrier LAN Airlines. On 26 November 2010, LAN Airlines announced that it completed the purchase of 98.9% of AIRES' shares, assuming its total debt and including it in the LAN holding company as a subsidiary of the group. On 3 December 2011, AIRES was renamed and started operations as LAN Colombia, becoming a member of the aeronautical holding LATAM Airlines Group.

== Destinations ==
LATAM Colombia serves the following destinations:

Country	City	Airport	Notes	Refs
Aruba	Oranjestad	Queen Beatrix International Airport		
Brazil	São Paulo	São Paulo–Guarulhos International Airport		
Colombia	Apartadó	Antonio Roldán Betancourt Airport	Terminated	
Colombia	Armenia	El Edén International Airport		
Colombia	Barrancabermeja	Yariguíes Airport	Terminated	
Colombia	Barranquilla	Ernesto Cortissoz International Airport		
Colombia	Bogotá	El Dorado International Airport	Hub	
Colombia	Bucaramanga	Palonegro International Airport		
Colombia	Buenaventura	Gerardo Tobar López Airport	Terminated	
Colombia	Cali	Alfonso Bonilla Aragón International Airport		
Colombia	Cartagena	Rafael Núñez International Airport		
Colombia	Caucasia	Juan H. White Airport	Terminated	
Colombia	Cúcuta	Camilo Daza International Airport		
Colombia	Florencia	Gustavo Artunduaga Paredes Airport	Terminated	
Colombia	Guapi	Guapi Airport	Terminated	
Colombia	Ibagué	Perales Airport		
Colombia	Ipiales	San Luis Airport	Terminated	
Colombia	Leticia	Alfredo Vásquez Cobo International Airport		
Colombia	Manizales	La Nubia Airport	Terminated	
Colombia	Medellín	Olaya Herrera Airport	Terminated	
Colombia	Medellín	José María Córdova International Airport	Focus city	
Colombia	Montería	Los Garzones Airport		
Colombia	Neiva	Benito Salas Airport		
Colombia	Pasto	Antonio Nariño Airport		
Colombia	Pitalito	Contador Airport	Terminated	
Colombia	Pereira	Matecaña International Airport		
Colombia	Popayán	Guillermo León Valencia Airport	Terminated	
Colombia	Puerto Leguizamo	Caucaya Airport	Terminated	
Colombia	Quibdó	El Caraño Airport	Terminated	
Colombia	Riohacha	Almirante Padilla Airport		
Colombia	San Andrés Island	Gustavo Rojas Pinilla International Airport		
Colombia	San Vicente del Caguán	Eduardo Falla Solano Airport	Terminated	
Colombia	Santa Marta	Simón Bolívar International Airport		
Colombia	Sogamoso	Alberto Lleras Camargo Airport	Terminated	
Colombia	Tame	Gabriel Vargas Santos Airport	Terminated	
Colombia	Tumaco	La Florida Airport	Terminated	
Colombia	Valledupar	Alfonso López Pumarejo Airport	Terminated	
Colombia	Villavicencio	La Vanguardia Airport	Terminated	
Colombia	Yopal	El Alcaraván Airport		
Curaçao	Willemstad	Curaçao International Airport		
Dominican Republic	Punta Cana	Punta Cana International Airport	Terminated	
Ecuador	Quito	Mariscal Sucre International Airport		
Mexico	Cancún	Cancún International Airport	Terminated	
Peru	Lima	Jorge Chávez International Airport		
United States	Fort Lauderdale	Fort Lauderdale–Hollywood International Airport	Terminated	
United States	Miami	Miami International Airport		
United States	New York City	John F. Kennedy International Airport	Terminated	
United States	Orlando	Orlando International Airport		
Venezuela	Caracas	Simón Bolívar International Airport		
Venezuela	Maracaibo	La Chinita International Airport	Terminated	

=== Codeshare Agreements ===
- Lufthansa

== Fleet ==
=== Current fleet ===
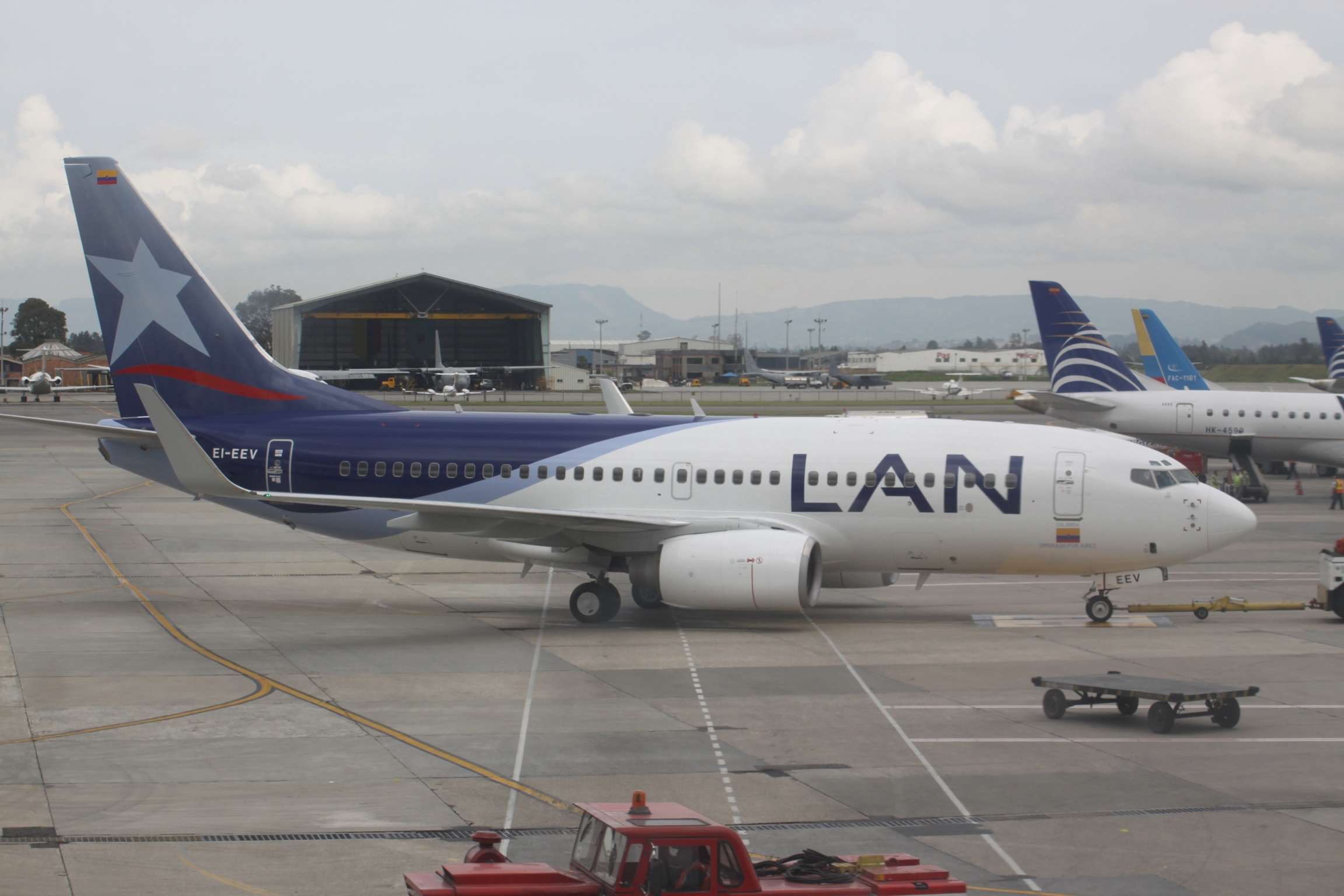
Former LAN Colombia Boeing 737-700 at El Dorado International Airport in 2012

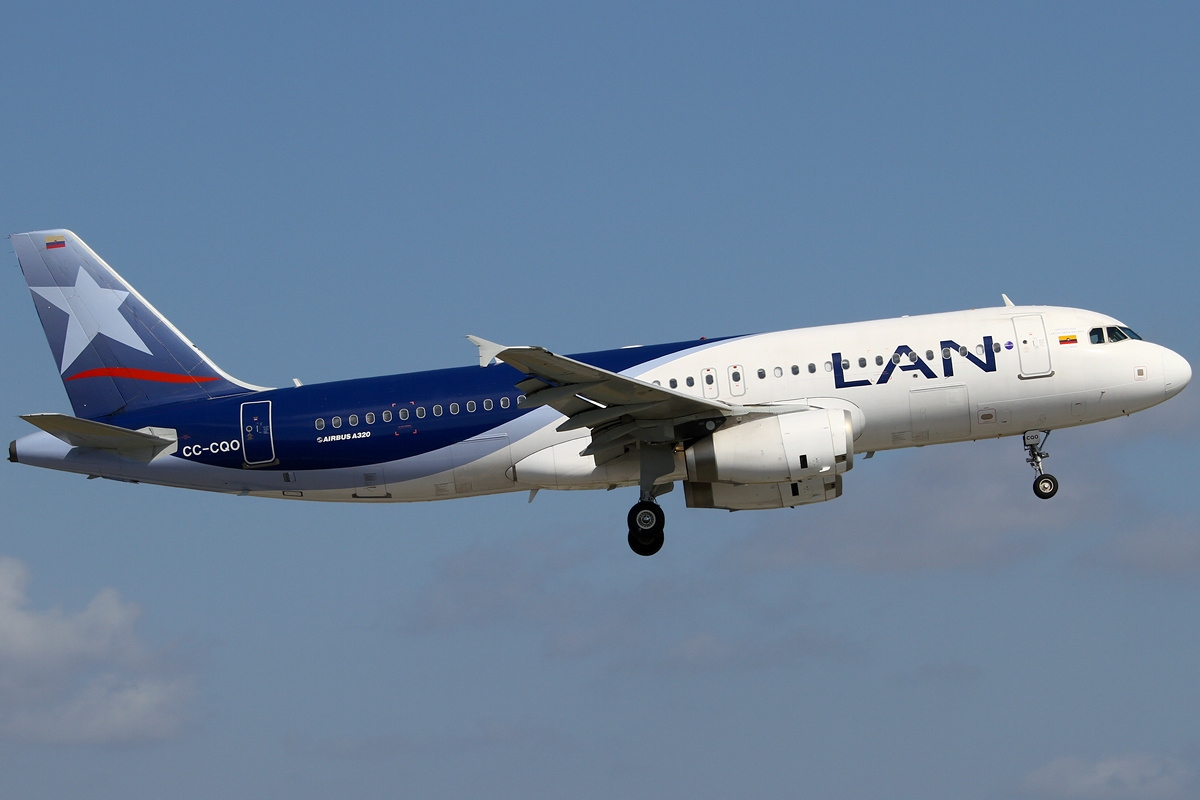
LAN Colombia Airbus A320-200 in 2013

As of July 2026, LATAM Airlines Colombia operates the following aircraft:

LATAM Colombia fleet
Aircraft	In service	Orders	Passengers			Notes
Aircraft	In service	Orders	J	Y	Total	Notes
Airbus A320	36	—	–	174	174	
Total	36	—				

=== Former fleet ===
As of August 2025, LATAM Colombia operated 29 Airbus A320

The airline also previously operated the following aircraft:

LATAM Colombia former fleet
Aircraft	Total	Introduced	Retired	Notes
Airbus A319-100	6			
Boeing 737-700	10	2009	2014	One written off as Flight 8250
Boeing 767-300ER	3	2012	2016	Operated by LAN Airlines
De Havilland Canada DHC-6-300 Twin Otter	1	1987	1988	
De Havilland Canada Dash 8-100	4	1994	2009	
De Havilland Canada Dash 8-200	12	2003	2015	
De Havilland Canada Dash 8-300	4	1994	2011	
De Havilland Canada Dash 8-400	4	2010	2014	Purchased from Jeju Air
Embraer EMB 110 Bandeirante	6	1981	2001	
Fairchild F-27	4	1987	1997	

== Accidents and incidents ==
- On 23 January 1985, AIRES Flight 585, a Embraer EMB 110 Bandeirante (registered HK-2638), crashed into a mountain of Cerro Tesorito, killing all 17 on board.
- On 14 August 1995, AIRES Flight 413, an Embraer EMB 110 Bandeirante (registered HK-2594), crashed into a mountain of the Nevado del Huila, Colombia. All 6 passengers and 2 pilots were killed.
- On 20 February 2002, a Bombardier Dash 8-300 (registered HK-3951X), en route from Neiva to Bogotá, was hijacked by 4 brigands, forcing them to land in a town and kidnapped a senator who was on board.
- On 28 January 2008, AIRES Flight 053, Bombardier Dash 8-200 (registered HK-3997), overran the runway at El Dorado International Airport, en route from Maracaibo, Venezuela after the left gear collapsed. The probable cause of the crash was that the aircraft was carrying out a landing with an unresolved fault in the left engine, which prevented the aircraft from being able to stop within the length of runway available, causing a runway excursion. A contributing factor was the failure to correct the maintenance reports in a satisfactory manner and the failure to properly follow up on repetitive entries. None of the 41 occupants were injured. The aircraft was substantially damaged and written off.
- On 23 August 2008, AIRES Flight 051, a Bombardier Dash 8-300 (registered HK-3952), sustained substantial damage after the right-hand main landing gear collapsed on landing at Ernesto Cortissoz International Airport. The crew noticed a vibration of the right gear. None of the 31 occupants were injured, but the aircraft was damaged beyond repair and was written off.
- On 16 August 2010, AIRES Flight 8250 crashed on landing at Gustavo Rojas Pinilla International Airport, in San Andrés, Colombia, after reportedly being struck by lightning during a thunderstorm. The death of one person was reported as a result of a heart attack on the way to the hospital and another 129 were injured. One of the injured occupants later died. The cause was later determined to be a pilot error.
- On 29 March 2022, LATAM Colombia Flight 4292, an Airbus A320-200 (registered CC-BAS) bound for Rafael Núñez International Airport in Cartagena, had to return and make an emergency landing at José María Córdova International Airport in Medellín after its nosewheel was discovered to be rotated ninety degrees. All the passengers and crew were unharmed.

== See also ==
- List of airlines of Colombia
