= Aerolínea de Antioquia =

Regional airline in Colombia, 1987–2019

IATA	ICAO	Call sign
-	ANQ	ANTIOQUIA
- Founded: 1987; 39 years ago
- Ceased operations: March 29, 2019; 7 years ago
- Hubs: Olaya Herrera Airport
- Focus cities: Barranquilla; Caucasia; Quibdó
- Fleet size: 4
- Destinations: 14
- Headquarters: Olaya Herrera Airport, Medellín, Colombia
- Website: www.ada-aero.com

ADA S.A., operating as Aerolínea de Antioquia (ADA), was a regional airline headquartered at the Olaya Herrera Airport in Medellín, Colombia. It started operations in 1987. It ceased all operations on March 29, 2019. At its peak, the airline operated scheduled domestic services from Medellín to over 20 destinations. Its main base was in Olaya Herrera Airport.

== History ==
Old logo

The beginning of operations of Aerolínea de Antioquia dates back to 1987, when it was established for the executive charter service. In 1998, it began its transformation process by connecting Medellín with regional destinations.

At the start of its regular operation, ADA had 4 Twin Otter type aircraft that had been operated by ACES, and only covered short routes within the department of Antioquia. In March 2002, it acquired a Twin Otter fleet from ACES Colombia. It contracted with that company for the training of its crews and maintenance of its aircraft; ACES in turn contracted with ADA for the operation of some of its regional routes such as Caucasia, Puerto Berrío and Armenia until it ceased operations in 2003.

In 2003, ADA became a commercial air service company of the Regular Public Transport, in their Secondary Category. This new stage allowed the airline to access new routes. ADA transported players from Atlético Nacional to the Copa Libertadores and journalists to the World Cup in Brazil in 2014.

In 2006, ADA further consolidated its corporate social responsibility policy with the "Making the dream of flying come true" program. With it, hundreds of passengers from different municipalities of the country could travel by plane for the first time in their lives and enjoy a flight over their regions of origin. In 2012, ADA strengthened its services by adding the Dornier 328 to their fleet. In March 2019, ADA suspended its operations, due to financial losses of more than 400 million pesos.

== Destinations ==
Aerolínea de Antioquia served the following destinations (as of March 2019):

City	Country	IATA	ICAO	Airport	Notes	Ref
Acandí	Colombia	ACD	SKAD	Alcides Fernández Airport		
Apartadó	Colombia	APO	SKLC	Antonio Roldán Betancourt Airport		
Armenia	Colombia	AXM	SKAR	El Edén International Airport		
Bahía Solano	Colombia	BSC	SKBS	José Celestino Mutis Airport		
Barranquilla	Colombia	BAQ	SKBQ	Ernesto Cortissoz International Airport	Focus city	
Cali	Colombia	CLO	SKCL	Alfonso Bonilla Aragón International Airport		
Caucasia	Colombia	CAQ	SKCU	Juan H. White Airport	Focus city	
Corozal	Colombia	CZU	SKCZ	Las Brujas Airport		
El Bagre	Colombia	EBG	SKEB	El Bagre Airport		
Medellín	Colombia	EOH	SKMD	Enrique Olaya Herrera Airport	Hub	
Montería	Colombia	MTR	SKMR	Los Garzones Airport		
Pereira	Colombia	PEI	SKPE	Matecaña International Airport		
Quibdó	Colombia	UIB	SKUI	El Caraño Airport	Focus city	
Tolú	Colombia	TLU	SKTL	Golfo de Morrosquillo Airport		

== Fleet ==
=== Final fleet ===
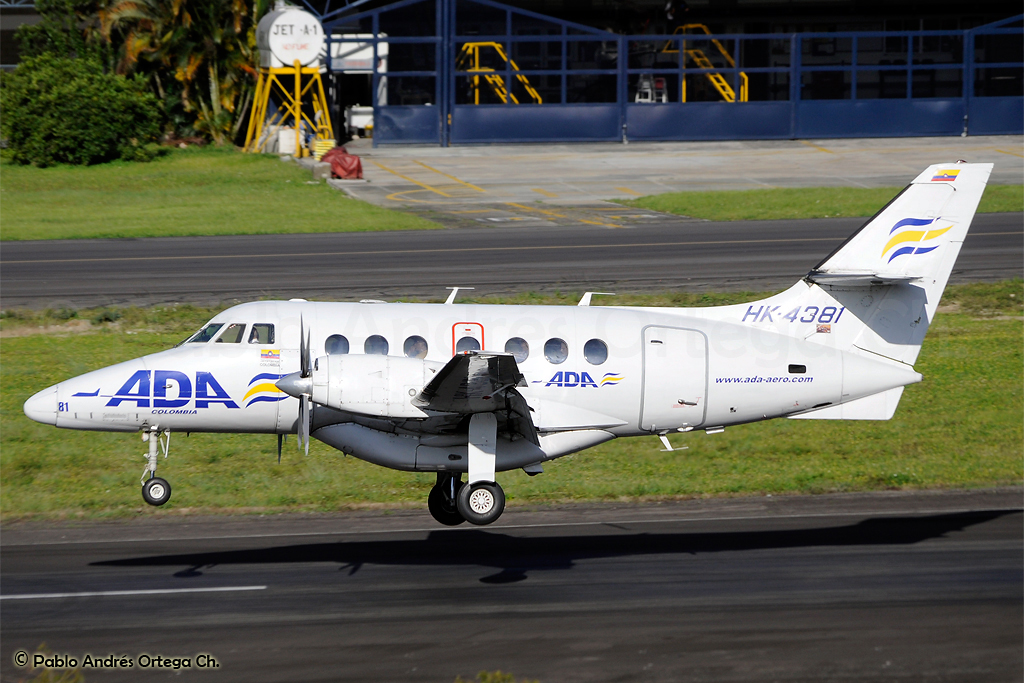
An ADA Jetstream 31 landing

The Aerolínea de Antioquia fleet included the following aircraft (as of March 2019):

Eastern Airlines fleet
Aircraft	In service	Orders	Passengers	Notes
Dornier 328-110	3	—	32	Purchased from VIP Ecuador
Dornier 328-120	1	—	32	Purchased from SATENA
Total	4	—		

=== Former fleet ===
The airline previously operated the following aircraft:

- British Aerospace Jetstream 32
- Cessna 303
- de Havilland Canada DHC-6 Twin Otter

== See also ==
- List of defunct airlines of Colombia
