= San Jeronimo Airport =

Airport in Colombia

San Jeronimo Airport Aeropuerto de San Jeronimo
- IATA: SJM; ICAO: none

Summary
- Airport type: Public, Defunct
- Operator: city of Montería
- Serves: Montería
- Opened: 1937
- Closed: 1974
- Focus city for: Lansa
- Elevation AMSL: 52 ft / 16 m
- Coordinates: 8°44′49.14″N 75°52′47.75″W

Map

Runways
| Direction | Length | | Surface |
| Direction | ft | m | Surface |
|---|---|---|---|
| none | 3,459 | 1,054 | concrete(Closed) |

San Jeronimo Airport was the old airport of Montería, Colombia. It is now The Hospital of Saint Jeronimo in the downtown area of the town.

== Historical Airlines and destinations ==
| Airlines | Destinations |
|---|---|
| Avianca | Lorica, Medellín–Olaya Herrera, |

== Accidents and incidents ==
- On March 15, 1961, a Douglas DC-3 operated by Avianca overshoot the runway due bad weather and the runway being too short. It was landing after a flight from Medellin. There were 2 crew members and 14 passengers, everyone survived, but there were two minor injuries.
- On May 8, 1971, flight 706, a Douglas DC-4 operated by Avianca was hijacked on a flight to Barranquila several minutes after taking off from the airport. A young Colombian carried a gun and demanded to be flown to Maracaibo. The plane successfully landed in Maracaibo and the man confessed that he was diagnosed with skin cancer and could not be treated in Colombia.
