= Medellín Airport =

Medellín Airport can refer to:

- José María Córdova International Airport
- Enrique Olaya Herrera Airport
