= La Florida Airport =

La Florida Airport may refer to:

- La Florida Airport (Chile) in La Serena, Chile
- La Florida Airport (Colombia) in Tumaco, Colombia
