= Alcides Fernández Airport =

Alcides Fernández Airport Acandí Airport
- IATA: ACD; ICAO: SKAD

Summary
- Airport type: Public
- Operator: Aerocivil
- Location: Acandí, Colombia
- Elevation AMSL: 50 ft / 15 m
- Coordinates: 8°30′00″N 77°16′28″W

Map
- Location of the airport in Colombia

Runways
Direction	Length		Surface
Direction	m	ft	Surface
17/35	1,189	3,901	Asphalt
- Source: GCM Google Maps

Alcides Fernández Airport (IATA: ACD, ICAO: SKAD) is a commercial airport on the Caribbean coast serving to town of Acandí in the Choco Department of Colombia. The airport is considered by residents of the town of Acandí to be an important link between that community and the rest of Colombia as well as neighboring Panama.

The airport was closed for some time during the early 2000s, as tourism to Acandí suffered a downturn. Acandí's mayor paid $30,000,000 Colombian pesos (approximately US$12,500) to enlarge the airport's runway and build better terminal facilities. The Colombian government paid a total of $1,500,000,000 Colombian pesos (approximately US$630,500) to aide in the renovation of the airport as part of Plan Colombia. In 2003, Colombian transportation minister Andres Uriel Gallego and Colombia's Civil Aeronautics minister Juan Carlos Velez re-opened the airport to public flights after renovation was completed.

Prior to its closing, the airport was served by Aerolínea de Antioquia and West Caribbean Airways both of which flew 19 seat passenger aircraft to the airport.

== Airlines and destinations ==
Airlines	Destinations
SATENA	Medellín–Olaya Herrera

== See also ==
- Transport in Colombia
- List of airports in Colombia
