= Condoto =

Coordinates: 5°06′N 76°39′W

- Municipality and town
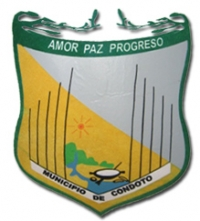
- Flag Coat of arms

- Location of the municipality and town of Condoto in the Chocó Department of Colombia.
- Country: Colombia
- Department: Chocó Department

Area
  - Municipality and town: 888 km^{2} (343 sq mi)

Population (2015)
  - Municipality and town: 14,660
  - Density: 16.5/km^{2} (42.8/sq mi)
  - Urban: 10,324
- Time zone: UTC-5 (Colombia Standard Time)

Condoto is the third most important municipality in the Chocó Department, after Quibdó and Istmina. It is situated in the south of the department and its main economical activity is mining (it is rich in gold and platinum) and agriculture. Condoto is also known as the "Platinum Capital of Colombia".

== Climate ==
Condoto has an extremely wet tropical rainforest climate (Af).

Climate data for Condoto (Mandinga Airport), elevation 66 m (217 ft), (1981–2010)
Month	Jan	Feb	Mar	Apr	May	Jun	Jul	Aug	Sep	Oct	Nov	Dec	Year
Mean daily maximum °C (°F)	29.9 (85.8)	30.3 (86.5)	30.6 (87.1)	30.7 (87.3)	30.8 (87.4)	30.8 (87.4)	30.7 (87.3)	30.7 (87.3)	30.5 (86.9)	30.2 (86.4)	29.9 (85.8)	29.7 (85.5)	30.4 (86.7)
Daily mean °C (°F)	26.0 (78.8)	26.1 (79.0)	26.3 (79.3)	26.3 (79.3)	26.5 (79.7)	26.3 (79.3)	26.3 (79.3)	26.1 (79.0)	26.1 (79.0)	25.9 (78.6)	25.7 (78.3)	25.4 (77.7)	26.1 (79.0)
Mean daily minimum °C (°F)	22.6 (72.7)	22.2 (72.0)	22.7 (72.9)	22.5 (72.5)	22.6 (72.7)	22.4 (72.3)	22.4 (72.3)	22.5 (72.5)	22.4 (72.3)	22.4 (72.3)	22.5 (72.5)	22.5 (72.5)	22.5 (72.5)
Average precipitation mm (inches)	618.6 (24.35)	574.6 (22.62)	554.4 (21.83)	619.8 (24.40)	694.2 (27.33)	585.2 (23.04)	601.5 (23.68)	677.8 (26.69)	650.9 (25.63)	650.5 (25.61)	547.8 (21.57)	624.6 (24.59)	7,399.9 (291.33)
Average precipitation days	25	21	22	24	24	24	25	25	25	24	23	23	277
Mean monthly sunshine hours	80.6	70.6	74.4	75.0	102.3	99.0	111.6	105.4	87.0	89.9	90.0	80.6	1,066.4
Mean daily sunshine hours	2.6	2.5	2.4	2.5	3.3	3.3	3.6	3.4	2.9	2.9	3.0	2.6	2.9
Source: Instituto de Hidrologia Meteorologia y Estudios Ambientales
