= Golfo de Morrosquillo Airport =

Golfo de Morrosquillo Airport Aeropuerto de Golfo de Morrosquillo
- IATA: TLU; ICAO: SKTL

Summary
- Airport type: Public
- Owner/Operator: Aerocivil
- Location: Tolú, Colombia
- Elevation AMSL: 16 ft / 5 m
- Coordinates: 9°30′35″N 75°35′10″W

Map
- Location of airport in Colombia

Runways
Direction	Length		Surface
Direction	m	ft	Surface
17/35	1,350	4,429	Asphalt
- Sources: GCM Google Maps

Golfo de Morrosquillo Airport (IATA: TLU, ICAO: SKTL) is a commercial airport serving the Caribbean coast municipality of Tolú in the Sucre Department of Colombia. The airport is on the coast south of the town, and north approaches and departures are over the water.

The airport was refurbished in 2010 extending its terrain and runway. Currently, Aerolínea de Antioquia and SATENA are the only airlines that serve this airport.

Aerolínea de Antioquia is the most prominent airlines at the airport, operating Dornier 328s, and SATENA began operations in early March, 2017, operating ATR 42s.

== Airport renovation ==
The Special Administrative Unit of Civil Aeronautics of Colombia invested 4,425,000,000 COP (US$2,500,000 app) to expand the airport in 2010. The airport lengthened its runway from 850 metres (2,790 ft) to 1,350 metres (4,430 ft)

== Airlines and destinations ==
Airlines	Destinations
Clic	Medellín–Olaya Herrera
SATENA	Bogotá, Medellín–Olaya Herrera

== See also ==
- Transport in Colombia
- List of airports in Colombia
