= Mandinga Airport =

Mandinga Airport Condoto Airport
- IATA: COG; ICAO: SKCD

Summary
- Airport type: Public
- Serves: Condoto, Colombia
- Elevation AMSL: 213 ft / 65 m
- Coordinates: 5°04′20″N 76°40′35″W

Map
- Location of the airport in Colombia

Runways
Direction	Length		Surface
Direction	m	ft	Surface
09/27	1,213	3,980
- Sources: GCM Google Maps

Mandinga Airport (IATA: COG, ICAO: SKCD) is an airport serving the platinum mining town of Condoto in the Chocó Department of Colombia.

The airport is 3 kilometres (1.9 mi) southwest of the town. The Condoto non-directional beacon (Ident: CDT) is located on the field.

== Airlines and destinations ==
Airlines	Destinations
SATENA	Cali, Medellín–Olaya Herrera

== See also ==
- Transport in Colombia
- List of airports in Colombia
