= Capurganá Airport =

Airport in Colombia

- IATA: CPB; ICAO: SKCA

Summary
- Airport type: Public
- Elevation AMSL: 49 ft / 15 m
- Coordinates: 8°37′50″N 77°21′05″W

Map
- Location of the airport in Colombia

Runways
Direction	Length		Surface
Direction	m	ft	Surface
04/22	800	2,625	Asphalt
- Sources: GCM Google Maps HERE Maps

Capurganá Airport (IATA: CPB, ICAO: SKCA) is an airport serving the Caribbean coastal town of Capurganá in the Chocó Department of Colombia. No roads go to Capurganá, so boats and aircraft are the primary means in and out.

The runway is 2 kilometres (1.2 mi) east of Colombia's border with Panama, with high terrain off the southern end. North arrivals and departures are over the water.

== Airlines and destinations ==
Airlines	Destinations
Pacifica de Aviacion	Medellín–Olaya Herrera
SEARCA	Medellín–Olaya Herrera

== See also ==
- Transport in Colombia
- List of airports in Colombia
