= Contador Airport =

Airport in Colombia

Pitalito Airport Contador Airport
- IATA: PTX; ICAO: SKPI

Summary
- Airport type: Public
- Serves: Pitalito, Colombia
- Elevation AMSL: 4,212 ft / 1,284 m
- Coordinates: 1°51′25″N 76°05′15″W

Map
- Location of the airport in Colombia

Runways
Direction	Length		Surface
Direction	m	ft	Surface
07/25	1,500	4,921	Asphalt
- Source: GCM Google Maps

Pitalito Airport (IATA: PTX, ICAO: SKPI) is an airport serving the town of Pitalito in the Huila Department of Colombia. The runway is 4 kilometres (2.5 mi) west of the town.

== Airlines and destinations ==
Airlines	Destinations
Clic Air	Bogotá
SATENA	Bogotá, Cali

== See also ==
- Transport in Colombia
- List of airports in Colombia
