= Alfonso Bonilla Aragón International Airport =

Airport in Colombia

Alfonso Bonilla Aragón International Airport Palmaseca International Airport
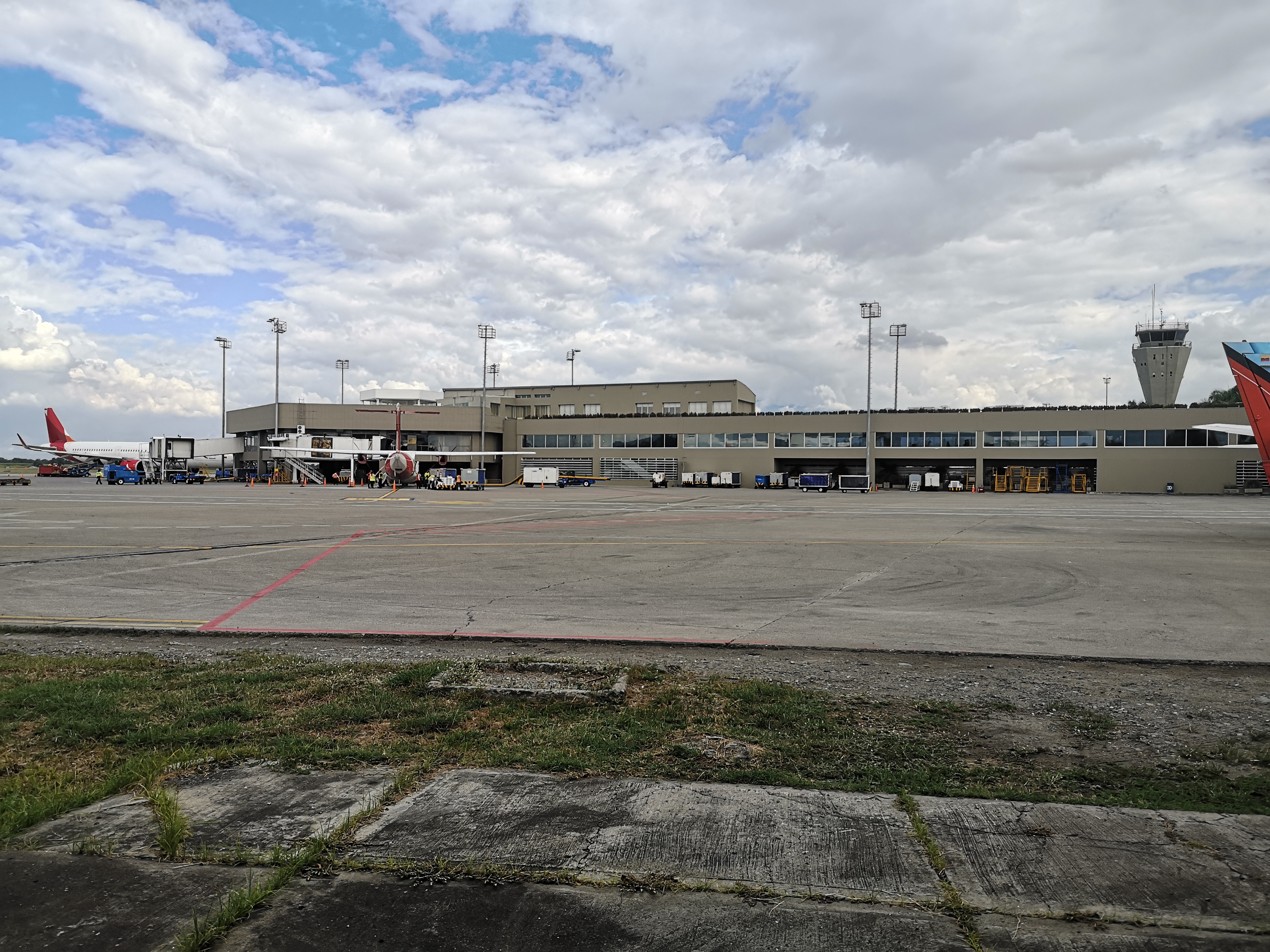
- IATA: CLO; ICAO: SKCL

Summary
- Airport type: Public
- Owner: Aeronáutica Civil
- Operator: Aeronáutica Civil
- Serves: Santiago de Cali, Palmira, Colombia
- Hub for: Avianca; TAC Colombia
- Focus city for: Aerosucre
- Elevation AMSL: 3,162 ft (964 m)
- Coordinates: 3°32′30″N 76°22′55″W
- Website: aeropuertocali.aerocivil.gov.co

Map
- Location within Valle del Cauca Department Location within Colombia

Runways
Direction	Length		Surface
Direction	m	ft	Surface
02/20	3,000	9,843	Asphalt

Statistics (2019)
- Aircraft operations: 81,420
- Passengers: 5,686,212
- Cargo tonnage: 44,362
- Sources: GCM Google Maps

Alfonso Bonilla Aragón International Airport (IATA: CLO, ICAO: SKCL), formerly known as Palmaseca International Airport, is an international airport located between Palmira and Cali, the capital of Valle del Cauca Department, Colombia. It is Colombia's fourth-busiest airport in passenger volume, with 5,600,000 people using the airport in 2016, and the third largest in area and construction. The airport often serves as the alternate airport for Bogotá - El Dorado Int'l Airport and other Colombian airports.

The airport lies in the center of the wide and fertile Cauca River valley, which runs north–south between the Western and Central Colombian Andes ranges. It is approximately a five-hour flight from Santiago de Chile, 50 minutes from Quito, Ecuador, and about three hours, 18 minutes from Miami.

The airport is one of the very few secondary airports in Latin America that operates 24 hours a day. This is made possible by the year-round stable meteorological conditions, and its distance from both Cali and Palmira, which means it is not subject to any noise restrictions, allowing aircraft to take off and land at any time of day. The airport has non-stop flights to the United States, Spain, Panama, Ecuador, Dutch Antilles, Mexico and Chile.

== History ==
On April 21, 1921, Ferruccio Guicciardi flew his Italian-made Macchi-Hanriot HD-1 (named "Telegraph I") from Guayaquil, Ecuador, to Cali, with stops in Quito and Pasto, Colombia. This was the first aircraft ever to land in Cali. He claimed the $9,500 peso prize offered by the Department of Valle and the Cali City Council to the first pilot who landed in the city. This event marked the birth of aviation activity in the capital of Valle del Cauca.

=== SCADTA ===
Following the war with Peru in 1932, President Enrique Olaya Herrera sought the help of SCADTA engineers and pilots to find a suitable site for an airport capable of providing air support to military operations. After evaluating several alternatives, the German pilot Herbert Boy chose an area called "El Guabito" because of its location, proximity to the city and an extension of Juanchito Avenue. After levelling the land with bulldozers a fledgling Air Force Base and Air National Guard station were built and operations began on September 21, 1933. Eventually, the number of airlines operating from the airport grew to include TACA de Colombia and VIARCO SAETA along with the already established SCADTA Panagra.

However, Panagra began looking for a suitable place for an airport in order to link South America with Panama through Cali, as well as its domestic flights operated by Avianca. To this end, they acquired land in the municipality of Candelaria, 18 miles from the center of Cali. On April 17, 1947, the modern facilities at "Calipuerto" were inaugurated. The airport passed to the Colombian state in the 1950s and was subsequently taken over by the Civil Aeronautics Department in 1968.

In 1946, the company VIARCO Valle, under the management of Ricardo A. Deeb, implemented an expansion policy including the construction of its own airport in Cali. The airport would be open to all airlines in the country except Avianca. In November 1946, the Aviation Authority requested an inspection of the new "El Limonnar" airport, located in the Pasoancho area of the city. In early 1947, the works were completed at the airport, which was put in service and equipped with the most modern facilities and equipment at that time. LANSA and other smaller companies also moved operations to this airport from the military airport at El Guabito, later renamed the Marco Fidel Suarez AFB. El Limonar was closed in 1954 following a merger between LANSA and Avianca and the subsequent transfer of operations to Calipuerto. The city of Cali, like Bogotá, at that time had three active airports in operation. When the new Palmaseca Airport opened the old Calipuerto buildings and runways were adapted and expanded to house Cavasa, an agricultural and food products distribution centre.

=== Palmaseca International Airport ===
The history of the new airport is directly linked to the 1971 Pan American Games, which were held in Cali. The infrastructure required to host an event of this magnitude made both the local and national government agencies broaden their horizons and commit to building the long-awaited and much-needed facility. The Civil Aeronautics Agency had already purchased a large plot of land from Hacienda Palmaseca in the neighbouring town of Palmira. The project was beset by operational and financial difficulties, and the central government had to inject a further US$35 million in order to complete the physical construction and meet international aviation safety standards. Furthermore, new roads linking the airport to the industrial city of Yumbo and the main Cali - Palmira highway were also built as part of the project.

Palmaseca International Airport was inaugurated on July 24, 1971, during the government of President Misael Pastrana Borrero. It had a 3000m long runway, taxiways, a parking apron, and a main terminal building for domestic and international flights. The terminal was equipped with airline service counters, restaurants, shops, a small hotel and even a nondenominational prayer chapel for nervous passengers. Although some critics initially claimed it was unnecessarily large and expensive for the city's needs at the time, air operations and passenger numbers quickly grew, justifying the size and cost of the project. The electronic, communications and safety equipment at the airport was recognized when it was designated as the alternate for Bogotá's El Dorado International. Airport.

In June 1989 local authorities renamed the airport after Alfonso Bonilla Aragón, a local civic leader and journalist who played a prominent role in the approval and construction of the airport. This decision proved highly unpopular with the people of Cali, and there were serious efforts made to reverse the decision. Even the Business Guilds and the Cali Chamber of Commerce formally requested that the government intercede and force the Civil Aeronautics Agency to change the name back to "Palmaseca".

== Reform and Privatisation ==
At the beginning of 1982, Álvaro Uribe Vélez, Director of Civil Aeronautics (then President of Colombia), made the decision to decentralize the management of two important international airports: Palmaseca in Cali and Olaya Herrera in Medellín. Palmaseca would be administered by a mixed economy company, proposed by the Permanent Business Committee of Valle del Cauca and the Cali Chamber of Commerce. The entity that would have to abide by the rules of public establishments would be 90% economically backed by state capital and 10% by private capital. The shareholders included Empresas Públicas de Cali, Palmira, Cortuvalle, C.V.C and Corporación Financiera del Transporte. This decentralization was never carried out and only years later the privatization process began

In the mid-1980s, part of the international terminal satellite collapsed, causing many criticisms of the design and construction firms of the building. In 1986 Civil Aeronautics had to assume the reconstruction of the international terminal satellite, together with the reinforcement of the rest of the structure.

The mid-1980s saw the construction of the cargo terminal, the general aviation area and a new airport fire station. In mid-1989 the main runway was repaved, which had deteriorated along 700 meters of the 3000 total meters in length. The general aviation area was also built, which soon became a clandestine center for drug trafficking operations.

For this reason, the Aeroclub del Pacifico decided to acquire a large plot of land near the Free Trade Zone, adjacent to header 1–9 to build its new facilities with direct access to the taxiway.

Years later the National Museum of Transport was built in that area.

== Structure and capacity ==
- Loading facilities feature a 747 freighter dock, bonded warehouse, in-transit area, free trade zone, cargo loading and unloading vehicles and equipment, public health officials, secure storage for valuables, and express and messenger center.
- Avianca has an Executive Lounge on the top floor of the Domestic Satellite Terminal, offering free Wi-Fi, cable TV, a wet bar and snacks counter, free newspapers and charging ports for mobile devices.

== Airlines and destinations ==
Map of domestic flights

=== Passenger ===
The following airlines operate regular scheduled and charter flights at the airport.

Airlines	Destinations
Aeroméxico	Mexico City–Benito Juárez
American Airlines	Miami
Avianca	Barranquilla, Bogotá, Cartagena, Fort Lauderdale, Madrid, Medellín–JMC, Miami, Pasto, Santa Marta; Seasonal: New York–JFK, San Andrés Island
Clic	Bogotá, Guapi, Medellín–Olaya Herrera, Neiva, Pasto, Puerto Asís, Quibdó, Tumaco, Villavicencio
Copa Airlines	Panama City–Tocumen
JetBlue	Fort Lauderdale
JetSmart Colombia	Bogotá, Cartagena, Medellín–JMC, Punta Cana, San Andrés Island, Santa Marta
JetSmart Chile	Antofagasta, Santiago de Chile
LATAM Colombia	Bogotá, Cartagena, Medellín–JMC, San Andrés Island
SATENA	Bahía Solano, Condoto, Florencia, Guapi, Ipiales, Neiva, Nuquí, Pitalito, Pizarro, Puerto Asís, Timbiquí, Tumaco
Wingo	Bogotá, Panama City–Balboa; Seasonal: Aruba
Venezolana	Seasonal charter: Porlamar
World2Fly	Madrid

=== Cargo ===
Airlines	Destinations
Aerosucre	Bogotá
Avianca Cargo	Medellín-JMC, Miami
LATAM Cargo Colombia	Miami

== Accidents and incidents ==
- On 21 January 1974, a Vickers Viscount of Aeropesca Colombia was hijacked and diverted to Cali.
- On 6 June 1992, Copa Airlines Flight 201 from Panama City to Bonilla Aragón Airport crashed in the Darién Gap due to spatial disorientation caused by instrument malfunction.
- On 20 December 1995, American Airlines Flight 965 from Miami to Bonilla Aragón Airport crashed into a mountain near Cali due to pilot error resulting from misinterpretation of waypoints meant to guide the plane into Bonilla. It remains the deadliest air disaster in Colombia.

== See also ==
- Transport in Colombia
- List of airports in Colombia
