= Gustavo Rojas Pinilla International Airport =

Gustavo Rojas Pinilla International Airport Aeropuerto Internacional Gustavo Rojas Pinilla
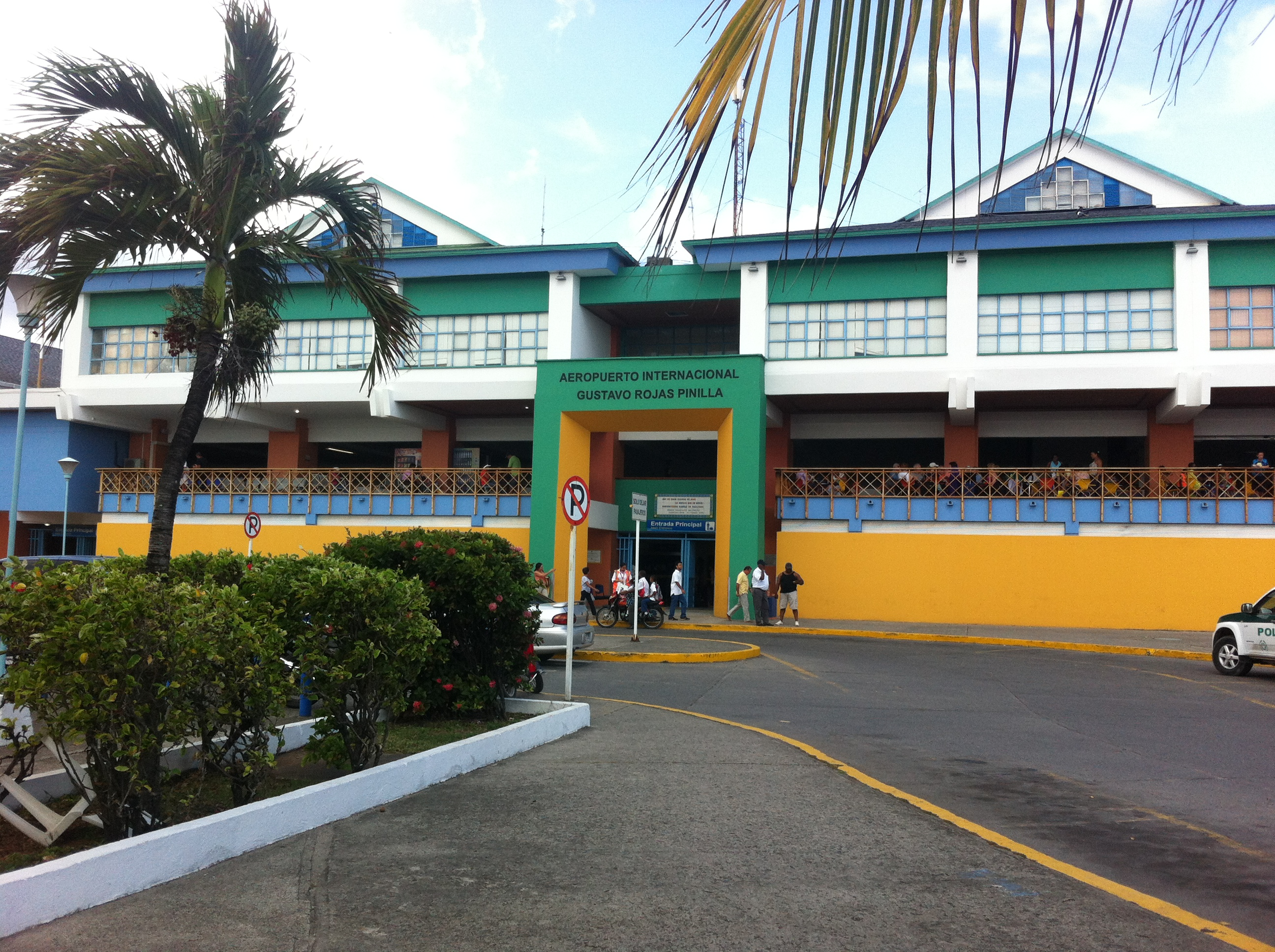
- IATA: ADZ; ICAO: SKSP; WMO: 80001

Summary
- Airport type: Public
- Owner: Aerocivil
- Location: San Andrés, Colombia
- Elevation AMSL: 19 ft (5.8 m)
- Coordinates: 12°35′00″N 81°42′40″W

Map
- Location within Isla de San Andrés (Colombia) Location within San Andrés y Providencia Location within Colombia

Runways
Direction	Length		Surface
Direction	m	ft	Surface
06/24	2,375	7,792	Asphalt

Statistics (2018)
- Passengers movement: 2.115.377
- Cargo movement: 6.822 T
- Air operations: 14.993
- Source: GCM

Gustavo Rojas Pinilla International Airport Spanish: Aeropuerto Internacional Gustavo Rojas Pinilla (IATA: ADZ, ICAO: SKSP) (formerly Sesquicentenario Airport) is the main airport in the archipelago of San Andrés, Providencia and Santa Catalina, one of the departments of Colombia. It is able to receive large aircraft and to accommodate seasonal and charter flights.

== History ==
The air terminal was renamed in honor of General Gustavo Rojas Pinilla (1900–1975), former president of Colombia, who ordered the airport to be built in the mid-1950s in order to link the Caribbean island with the continental territory of Colombia. The original name of the airport was Sesquicentenario Airport.

== Description ==
The airport is the sixth busiest airport in Colombia in terms of passengers, with 995,661 in 2011. Most of these passengers come from the continental part of the country, due to poor international direct service to the island. Many international tourists have to fly to one of Colombia's or Panama's largest airports (Bogotá, Medellín, Cali, Cartagena, Barranquilla or Panama City) to be able to reach the islands, although Copa Airlines maintains flights to Panama City. Aircraft up to the size of the Airbus A340-200 can land at the airport.

== Airlines and destinations ==
The following airlines operate regular scheduled and charter flights at the airport:

Airlines	Destinations
Avianca	Bogotá, Medellín–JMC; Seasonal: Cali
Copa Airlines	Panama City–Tocumen
JetSmart Colombia	Bogotá, Cali, Medellín–JMC
LATAM Colombia	Bogotá, Barranquilla, Cali, Cartagena, Medellín–JMC
SATENA	Providencia
WestJet	Seasonal: Montréal–Trudeau, Quebec City
Wingo	Barranquilla, Cartagena

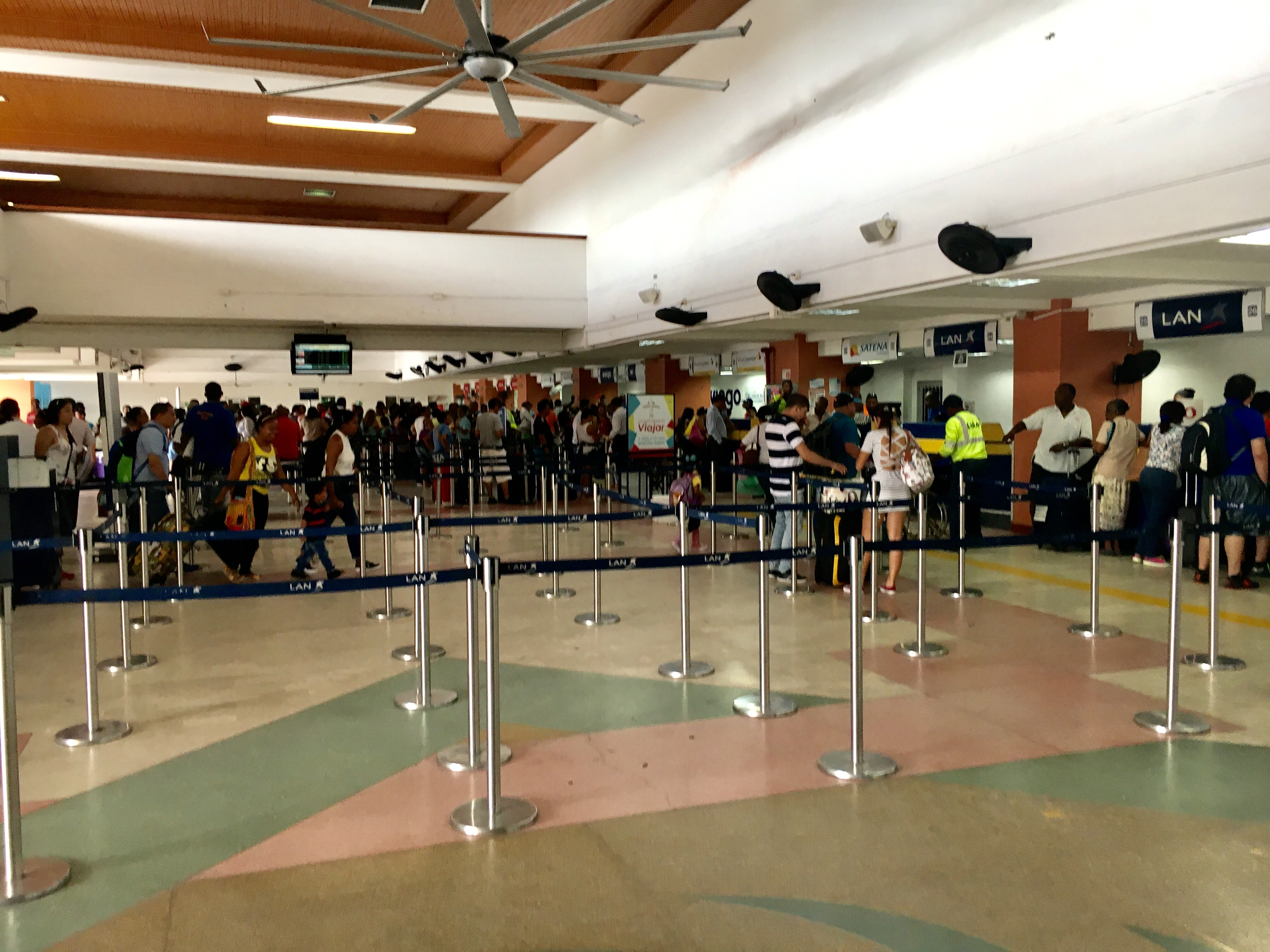
Check in and ticketing hall at San Andres Gustavo Rojas Pinilla International Airport (ADZ)

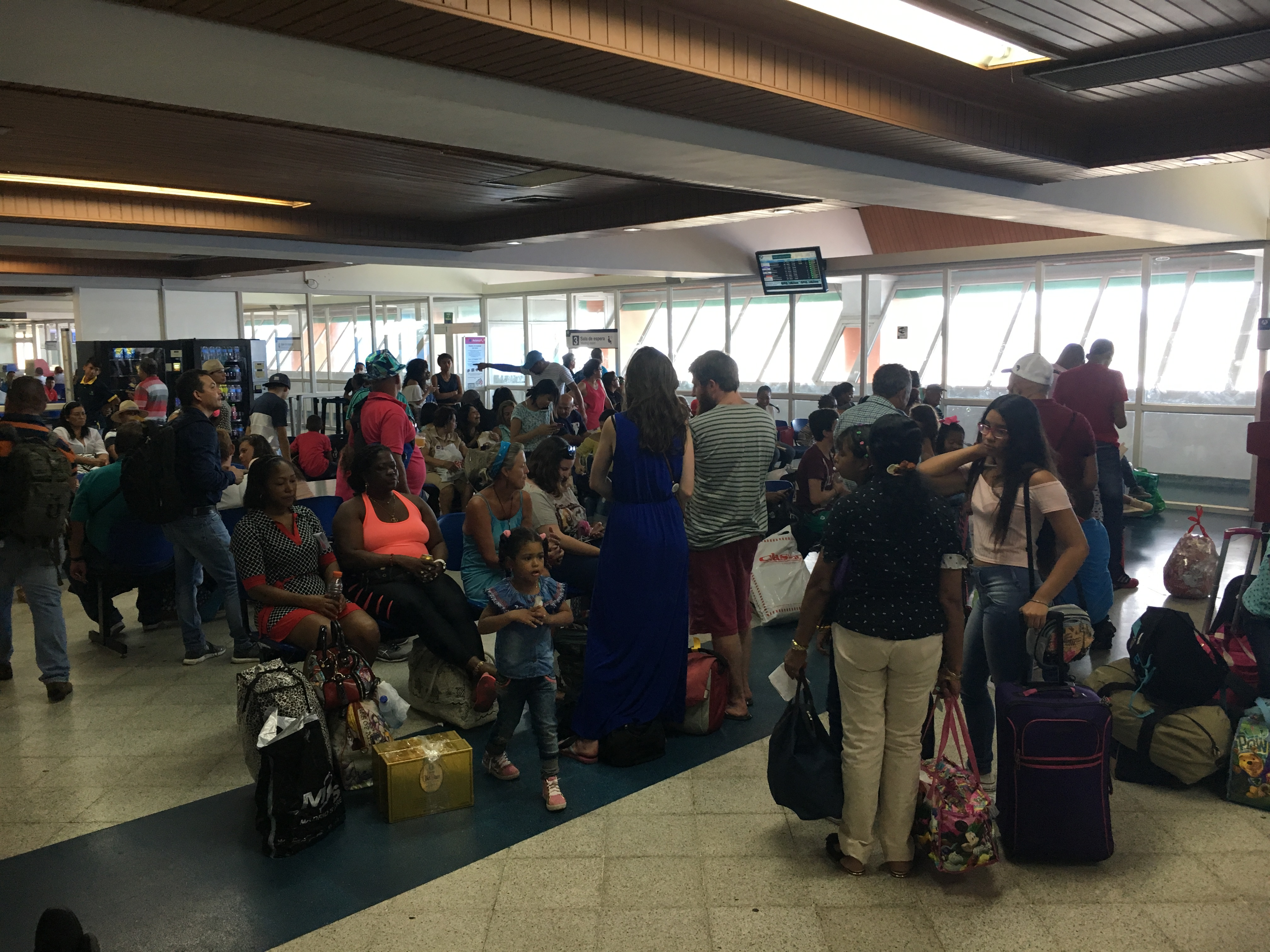
One of the boarding gate areas at ADZ San Andres airport

== Accidents and incidents ==
On January 27, 1982, a Boeing 727 plane travelling from Bogotá, Colombia to Pereira, Colombia was hijacked by armed members of the guerilla group M-19. After returning to Bogotá, they demanded to be flown to Cali, Colombia. A number of passengers were released, but after troops attempted to gain access to the plane a gun battle ensued. The hijackers were later allowed to depart on a jet. The Boeing departed, refuelling in San Andrés.

On August 16, 2010, AIRES Flight 8250, crashed when landing short of the runway on approach to Gustavo Rojas Pinilla International Airport, due to poor weather conditions. Two of the 125 passengers and 6 crew on board died.

On September 19, 2013, American Airlines Flight B752 from San Jose, Costa Rica, made an emergency landing at the San Andres Airport after reporting smoke in the cockpit. All 179 passengers were said to be safe and continued to Miami, their final destination, on a second plane. The aircraft involved in the incident was a Boeing 757.

== See also ==
- Transport in Colombia
- List of airports in Colombia
