= José María Córdova International Airport =

International airport in Rionegro, Colombia

José María Córdova International Airport Aeropuerto Internacional José María Córdova
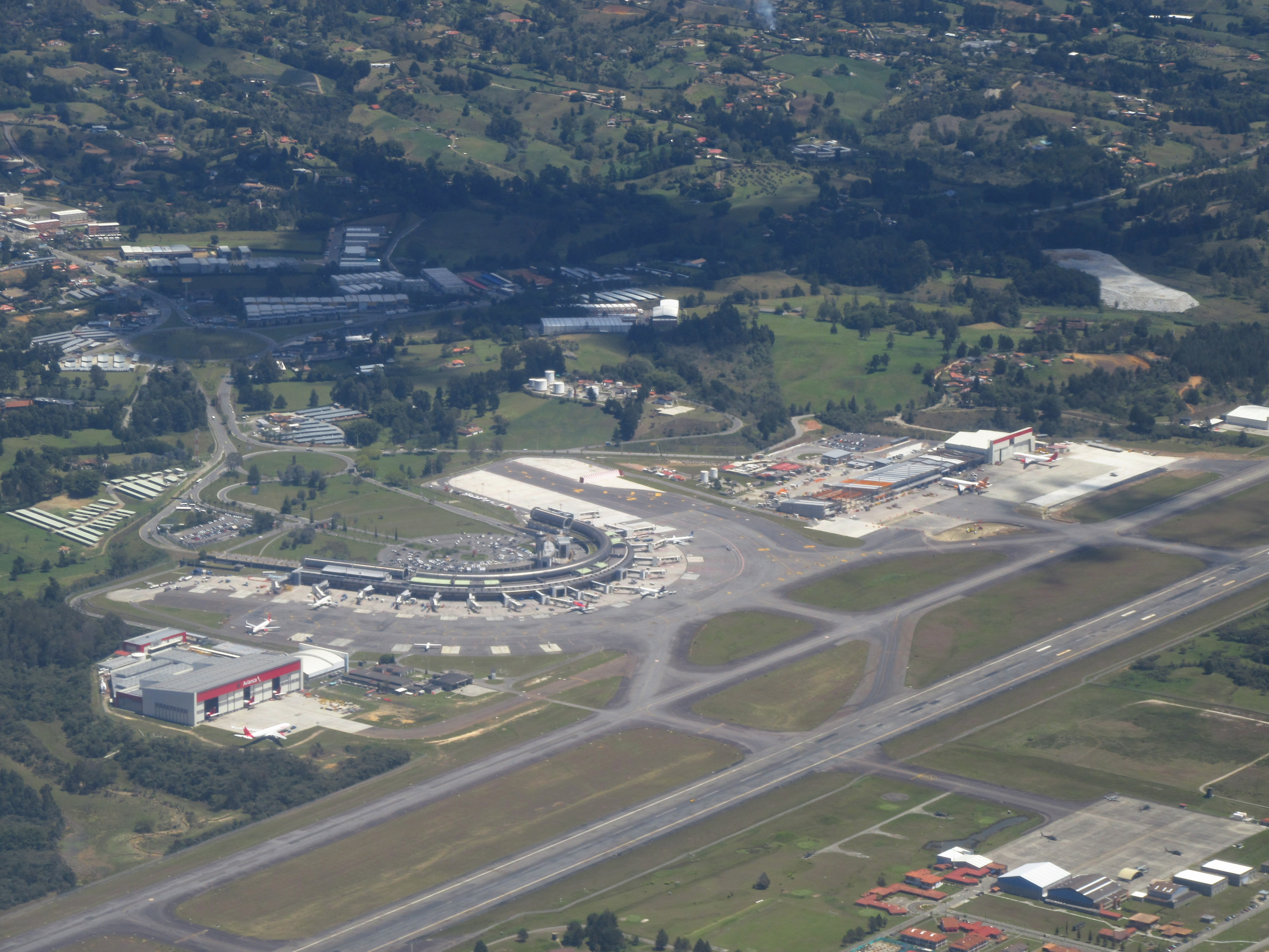
- IATA: MDE; ICAO: SKRG

Summary
- Airport type: Public
- Operator: Airplan MDE
- Serves: Medellín Metropolitan Area
- Location: Rionegro
- Opened: August 29, 1985; 41 years ago
- Elevation AMSL: 2,142 m (7,028 ft)
- Coordinates: 06°10′02″N 75°25′36″W
- Website: www.aeropuertorionegro.co

Map
- Location within Antioquia Department Location within Colombia

Runways
Direction	Length		Surface
Direction	m	ft	Surface
01/19	3,557	11,670	Asphalt

Statistics (2023)
- Total passengers: 11,779,828
- Source: Grupo Aeroportuario del Sureste

José María Córdova International Airport (IATA: MDE, ICAO: SKRG) is an international airport located in the city of Rionegro, 20 kilometres (12 mi) south-east of Medellín, and is the second largest airport in Colombia after El Dorado International Airport of Bogotá in terms of infrastructure and passenger service. The airport is named after José María Córdova (sometimes spelled "Córdoba"), a Colombian army general who was a native of Ríonegro. The airport is managed by Grupo Aeroportuario del Sureste.

It serves the Medellín Metropolitan Area and is the most important airport in the Antioquia Department. It was also the main hub for low-cost airline Viva Air Colombia until the airline ceased operating in February 2023. It serves several international destinations, one of the busiest being the route to Miami International Airport. It also serves the most flown route within Colombia: Medellín–Bogotá, which is mainly operated by Avianca and LATAM Colombia.

== Description ==
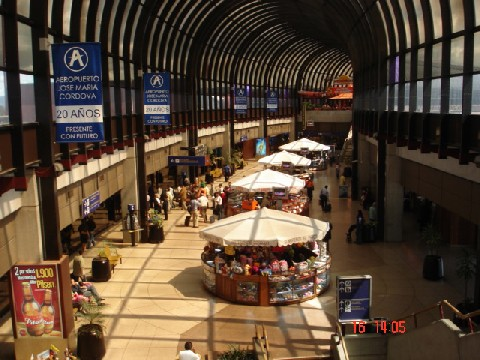
Terminal interior in 2005

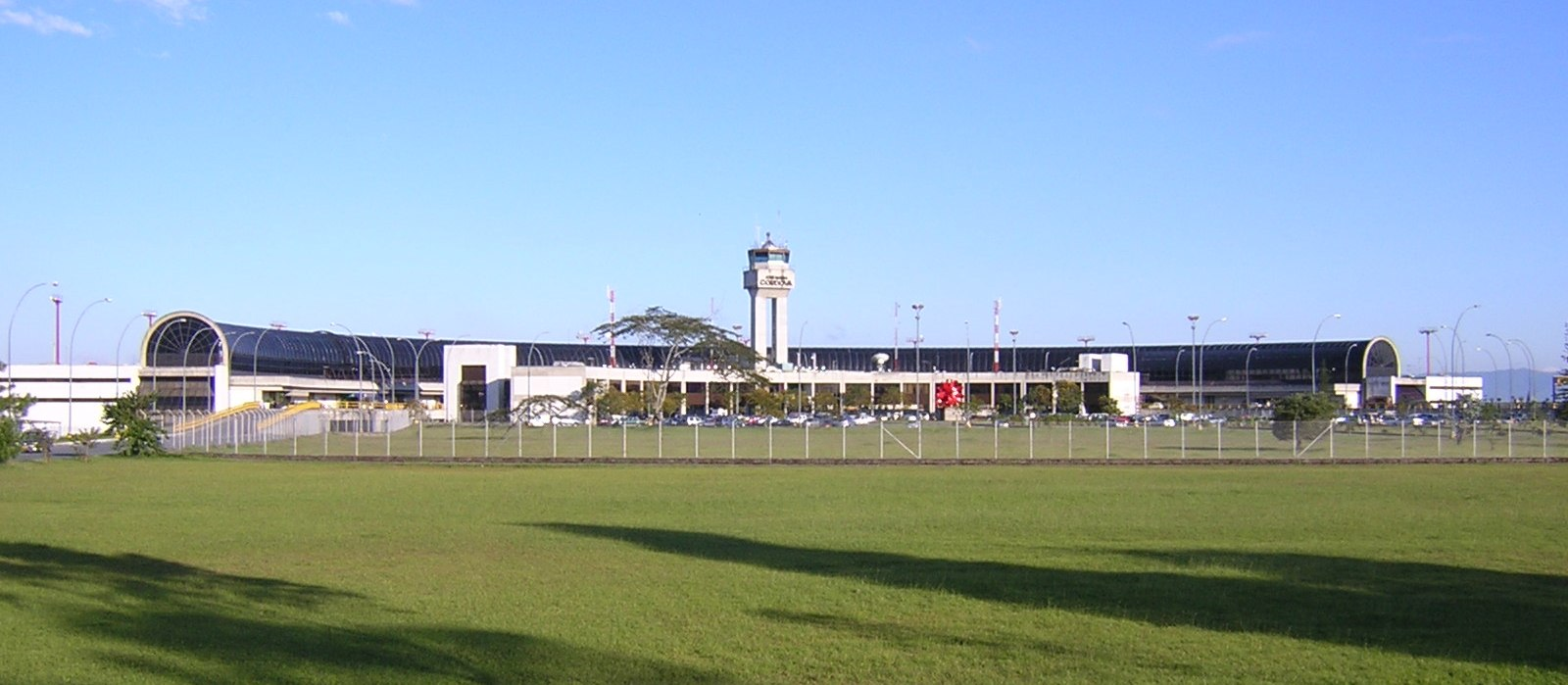
Terminal view

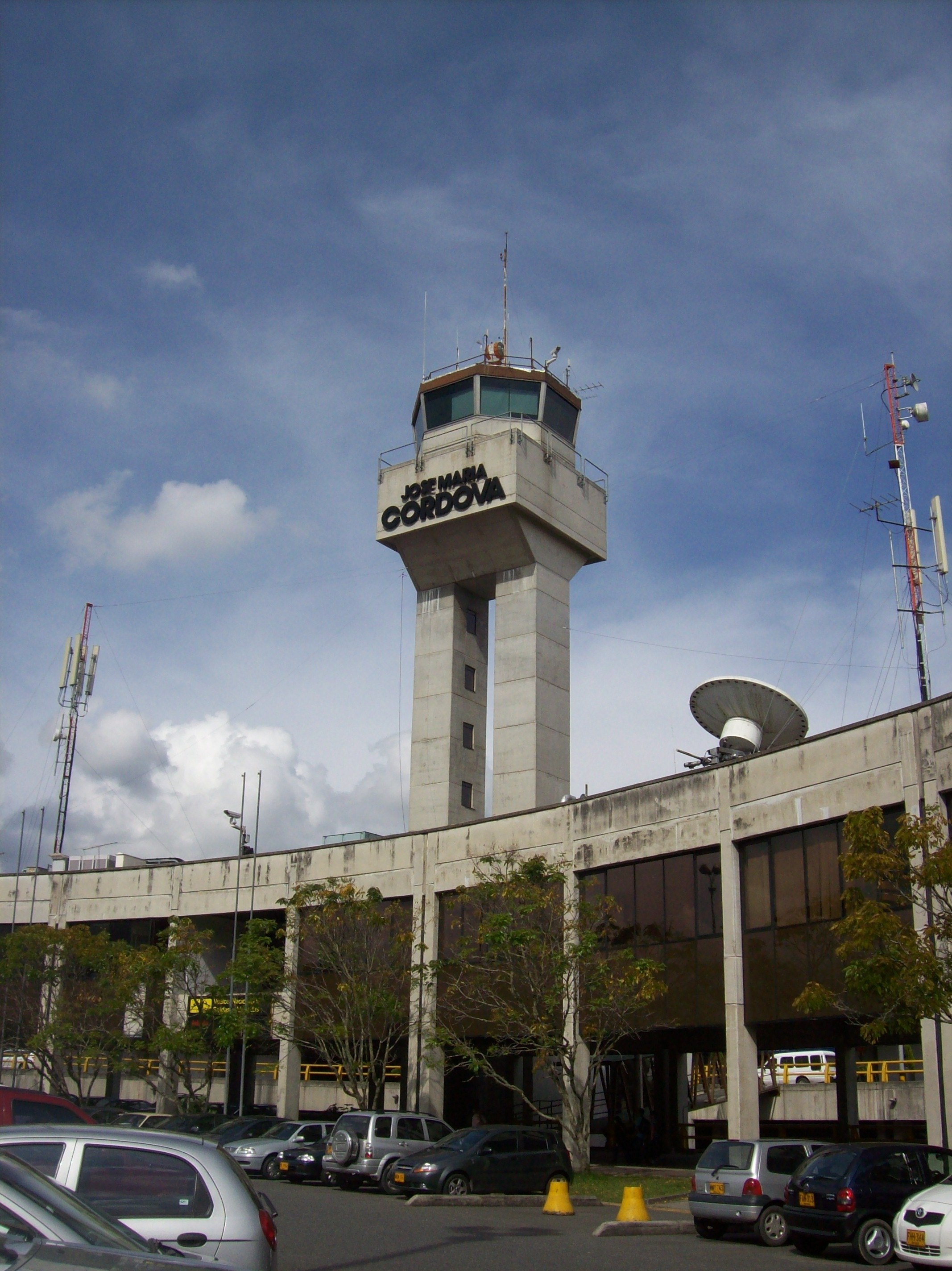
Control tower

The airport serves all major international and some minor domestic routes for the Medellín metro area, in contrast to the in-town yet much smaller Olaya Herrera Airport, which serves the Medellín area with domestic flights only. The airport is about a 30 minute drive from Medellín proper.

The runway is also used by the nearby military base of the Colombian Air Force located in Rionegro, named Air Combat Command No. 5 (CACOM 5), where all types of military and national police aircraft arrive and depart.

The airport has air navigation aids such as VOR, NDB, and ILS, which makes navigation and landings safer in bad weather.

Antioquia's exports, mostly flowers and local products from the region, depart to international destinations from the airport. The cargo operator, Avianca Cargo, has its main base at the airport, and operates flights to countries in South, Central and North America.

The airport was built with a dome shaped roof and has two stories. The airport has 17 gates: 10 domestic and 7 international, with four mixed-use gates. There are a number of restaurants and shops, including a duty-free shop airside of security. There are also banks, money exchange, and car rental services. Avianca has a VIP room, and there are also several VIP lounges operated by Global Lounge Network. Outside the main building is a parking lot and garage, which includes an area for motorcycles.

== History ==
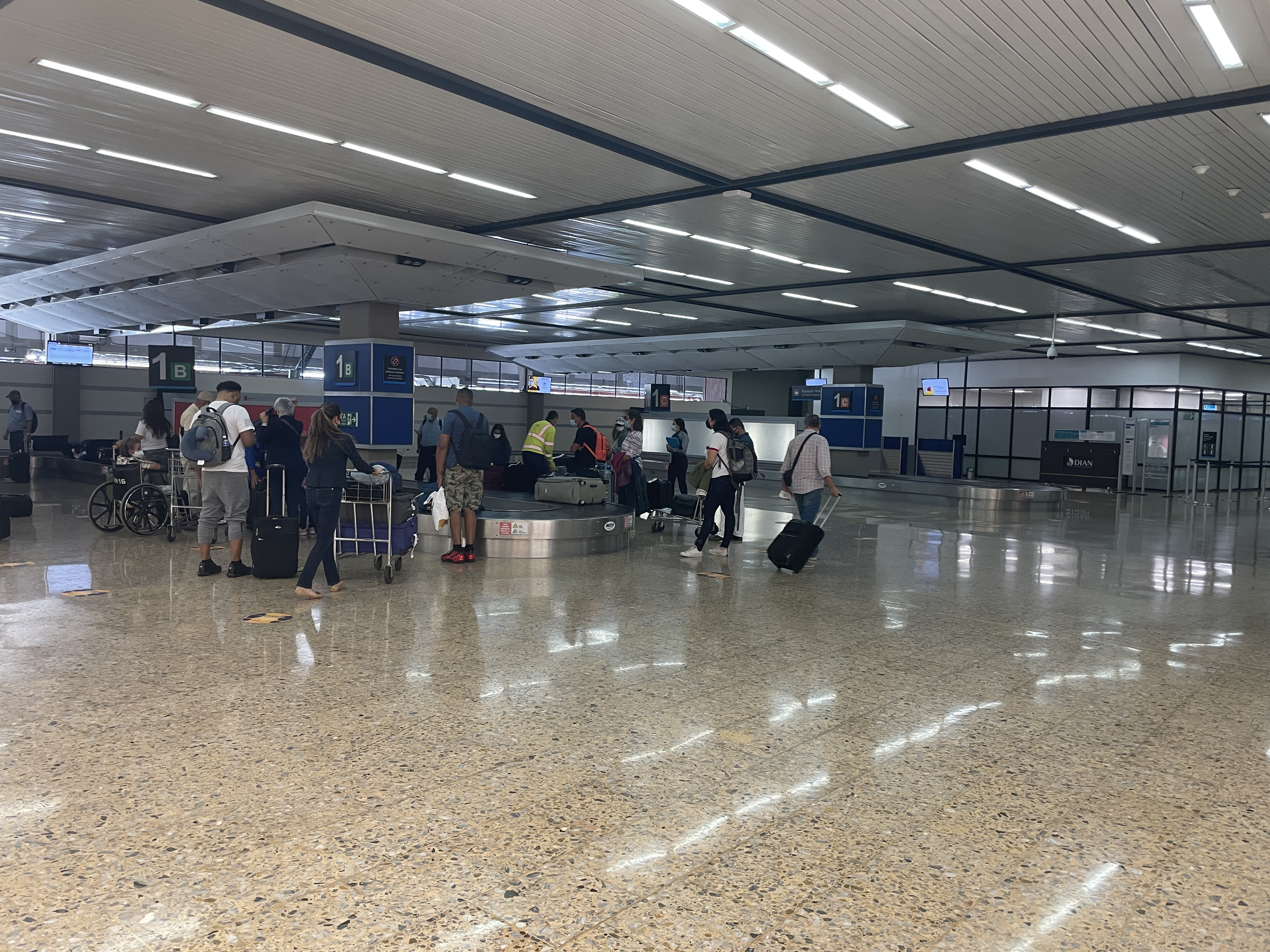
Baggage claim area in 2021

In the 1970s, the need for a larger airport for the Antioquia province arose due to the limitations of the Olaya Herrera Airport caused by insufficient space to expand. Two sites were proposed for the new airport: one in the vicinity of the municipality of Barbosa northeast of the city, and another in the valley of San Nicolas in Rionegro, east of the city. The latter was selected and construction began.

The airport opened on August 29, 1985. During the same year, Avianca conducted test flights of its Boeing 747, first on the original runway at Olaya Herrera Airport, and then at the new José María Córdova. During this time the airport had significant movement of cargo and passengers, as the Olaya Herrera airport was closed from 1986 until 1991. Today, the Olaya Herrera Airport still has significant passenger movements, because it is a main hub for domestic flights within Colombia and the preferred option for domestic flights out of Medellín.

In January 2006, an Airbus A380 landed at the airport to conduct technical tests of the engines. This was the first time a plane of that type had landed on Colombian soil, and also the first time it happened in South America.

In 2016, the airport handled 7,376,160 passengers, and 6,892,104 in 2017.

In August 2019, a new highway opened, which cut the traveling time from the airport to Medellín from almost an hour to just 20 minutes. The route includes a tunnel called "Túnel de Oriente". The total cost of the project was 1.1 trillion pesos.

== Renovation and expansion ==
The airport underwent an expansion and renovation that enlarged the domestic terminal from 41,350 square metres (445,100 sq ft) to 50,000 square metres (540,000 sq ft) and added five new gates to it, along with three new gates for the international terminal. The expansion increased the passenger handling capacity to 11 million annually. Other improvements included more food and shopping options, more digital displays with flight information, more car rental options, better airport connectivity with the parking lot, better airport connectivity to the parking garage, and the addition of a duty-free shop. The total cost of the works was 350 US$350,000,000, and were completed in December 2017.

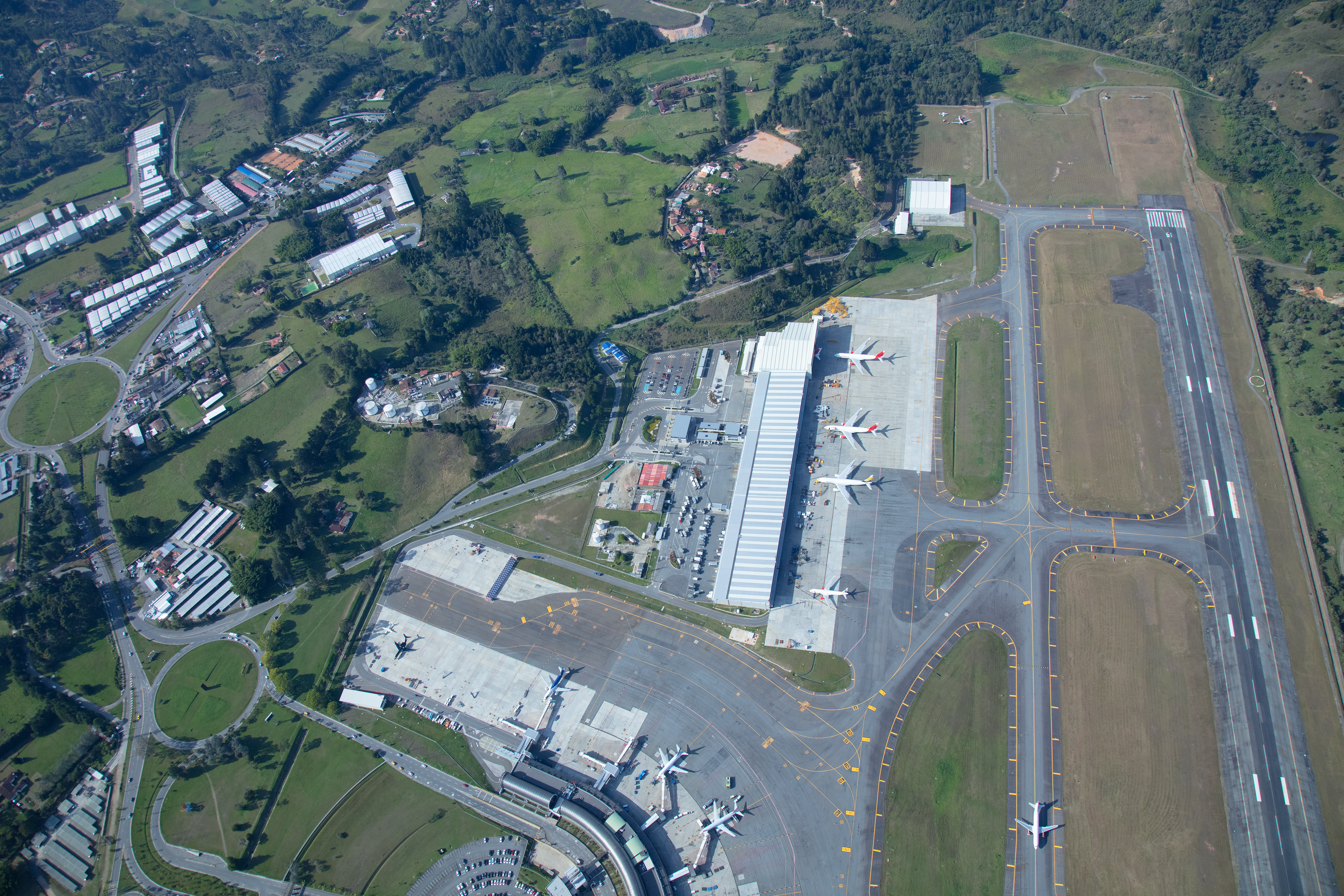
Aerial view of the international terminal, apron and cargo area at the airport

The cargo terminal expansion was completed in February 2020 at a cost of around $110 million pesos. The terminal went from 14,000 square metres (150,000 sq ft) to 16,000 square metres (170,000 sq ft).

== Airlines and destinations ==
=== Passenger ===
The following airlines operate regular scheduled and charter flights at the airport.

Airlines	Destinations
Aeroméxico	Mexico City–Benito Juárez
Air Europa	Madrid
Air Panama	Charter: Panama City–Albrook
Air Transat	Toronto–Pearson; Seasonal: Montréal–Trudeau
American Airlines	Miami
Arajet	Punta Cana, Santo Domingo–Las Américas
Avianca	Armenia, Barranquilla, Bogotá, Bucaramanga, Buenos Aires–Ezeiza (ends December 1, 2026), Cali, Cartagena, Cúcuta, Fort Lauderdale, Madrid, Mexico City, Miami, Montería, New York–JFK, Pasto, Pereira, Punta Cana, San Andrés Island, San Juan, Santa Marta; Seasonal: Orlando
Avianca Costa Rica	San José (CR)
Avianca El Salvador	San Salvador
Avianca Ecuador	Guayaquil, Quito
Avior Airlines	Barcelona (VE), Caracas
Copa Airlines	Panama City–Tocumen
Frontier Airlines	Orlando (begins 10 December 2026)
JetBlue	Fort Lauderdale, San Juan
JetSmart Chile	Santiago de Chile
JetSmart Colombia	Barranquilla, Bogotá, Buenos Aires–Ezeiza, Cali, Cartagena, Cúcuta, Montería, Pereira, Punta Cana, San Andrés Island, Santa Marta
JetSmart Perú	Lima
LATAM Colombia	Barranquilla, Bogotá, Cali, Montería, Pereira, San Andrés Island
LATAM Perú	Lima
Turpial Airlines	Valencia (VE)
United Airlines	Houston–Intercontinental
Viva	Mexico City–Felipe Ángeles
Volaris	Guadalajara (begins December 2, 2026)
Wingo	Aruba, Barranquilla, Bogotá, Bucaramanga, Cancún, Caracas, Cartagena, Curaçao, Guatemala City, Montego Bay, Panama City–Balboa, Punta Cana, San José (CR), Santa Marta, Santo Domingo–Las Americas; Seasonal: Porlamar
Z Air	Curaçao

=== Cargo ===
Airlines	Destinations
Aero Union	Miami
Amerijet International	Miami
Avianca Cargo	Lima, Miami, Quito, San José (CR)
FedEx Express	Miami
LATAM Cargo Brasil	Miami

== Statistics ==
Busiest domestic routes (round trip) out of Jose Maria Cordova International Airport (Jan.-Dec. 2016)
Rank	City	Passengers	Top carriers
1	Bogotá, Cundinamarca	3,590,548	Avianca, LATAM Colombia, Viva Colombia
2	Cali, Valle del Cauca	739,954	Avianca, Viva Colombia
3	Cartagena, Bolívar	735,408	Avianca, Viva Colombia, LATAM Colombia
4	Barranquilla, Atlántico	365,086	Avianca, Viva Colombia
5	San Andrés, San Andrés	329,274	LATAM Colombia, Viva Colombia
6	Santa Marta, Magdalena	276,684	Avianca, Viva Colombia
7	Montería, Córdoba	125,534	Avianca, Viva Colombia
8	Bucaramanga, Santander	65,888	Avianca

Busiest international routes (round trip) out of José María Córdova International Airport (Jan.-Dec. 2016)
Rank	City	Passengers	Top carriers
1	Panamá, Panama	386,499	Copa Airlines Colombia
2	Miami, United States	249,167	American Airlines, Avianca, Viva Colombia
3	Fort Lauderdale, United States	172,929	JetBlue Airways, Spirit Airlines
4	Madrid, Spain	85,894	Avianca, Iberia
5	San Salvador, El Salvador	63,614	Avianca El Salvador
6	New York, United States	63,475	Avianca
7	Lima, Peru	63,276	Avianca Perú
8	Mexico City, Mexico	62,774	Aeromexico
9	Atlanta, United States	56,857	Delta Air Lines
10	Panama City-Balboa, Panama	53,809	Viva Colombia, Wingo
11	Panama City–Albrook, Panama	46,873	Air Panama
12	Valencia, Venezuela	40,174	Avior Airlines
13	Willemstad, Curaçao	13,995	Insel Air
14	Oranjestad, Aruba	6,082	Insel Air Aruba

== Accidents and incidents ==
- On May 19, 1993, SAM Colombia Flight 501 crashed into Mt. Paramo Frontino while making an approach to the airport. The crash killed all 132 people on board, and this was the worst accident of the year 1993.
- On December 21, 1996, an Antonov An-32B aircraft (registration HK-4008X) operated by SELVA Colombia crashed while on final approach to runway 36. The aircraft had taken off from Bogotá for its usual cargo flight to José María Córdova Airport with 6 tons of cargo. During the approach phase, the plane veered three miles to the left of the glide slope, then turned sharply right, finally crashing more than five miles from the south end of the airport. The crash killed all four occupants of the aircraft.
- On December 22, 1998, an Antonov An-32B aircraft (registration HK-3930X) crashed while approaching the runway. The aircraft had taken off from Bogotá for a cargo flight to the airport. The accident occurred at dawn and weather conditions were very bad due to the dense fog that was present in the area. The accident killed all five occupants of the aircraft. A similar incident had occurred two years earlier, with a plane of the same company in similar circumstances.
- On October 15, 2004, a Douglas DC-3 (registration HK-1503) belonging to the company Aerovanguardia took off from La Vanguardia Airport in Villavicencio for a cargo flight to the airport. Shortly after takeoff, ATC informed the pilots that the airport was closed due to poor visibility caused by fog. The pilot decided to fly to the alternate Olaya Herrera Airport, but the aircraft collided with power cables during descent, crashing in a wooded area near the town of Santa Elena, west of Rionegro, and killing all three occupants of the aircraft.
- On June 7, 2006, a Tradewinds Airlines Boeing 747-200F (registration N922FT) had an engine failure on takeoff. The pilot aborted the takeoff but the plane overran the runway by 150m. None of the six on board was injured, but the plane was substantially damaged, with the nose gear being completely sheared off.
- On January 3, 2009, American Airlines Flight 924, a Boeing 737-800, took off from Jose Maria Cordova Airport and had to make an emergency landing due to fire in one of its engines. Upon landing, the pilot was forced to use maximum braking, causing the brakes to overheat and one of the tires to explode. The airport was closed for four hours, but none of the 148 passengers on board were injured in the crash.
- On November 28, 2016, LaMia Airlines Flight 2933, a Avro RJ85, crashed on its approach to the airport. The plane was carrying members of the Chapecoense football team who were on their way to compete in the 2016 Copa Sudamericana finals. There were 71 fatalities and six survivors in the accident.

== See also ==
- Transport in Colombia
- List of airports in Colombia
