= San Luis Airport (Colombia) =

San Luis Airport Aeropuerto San Luis
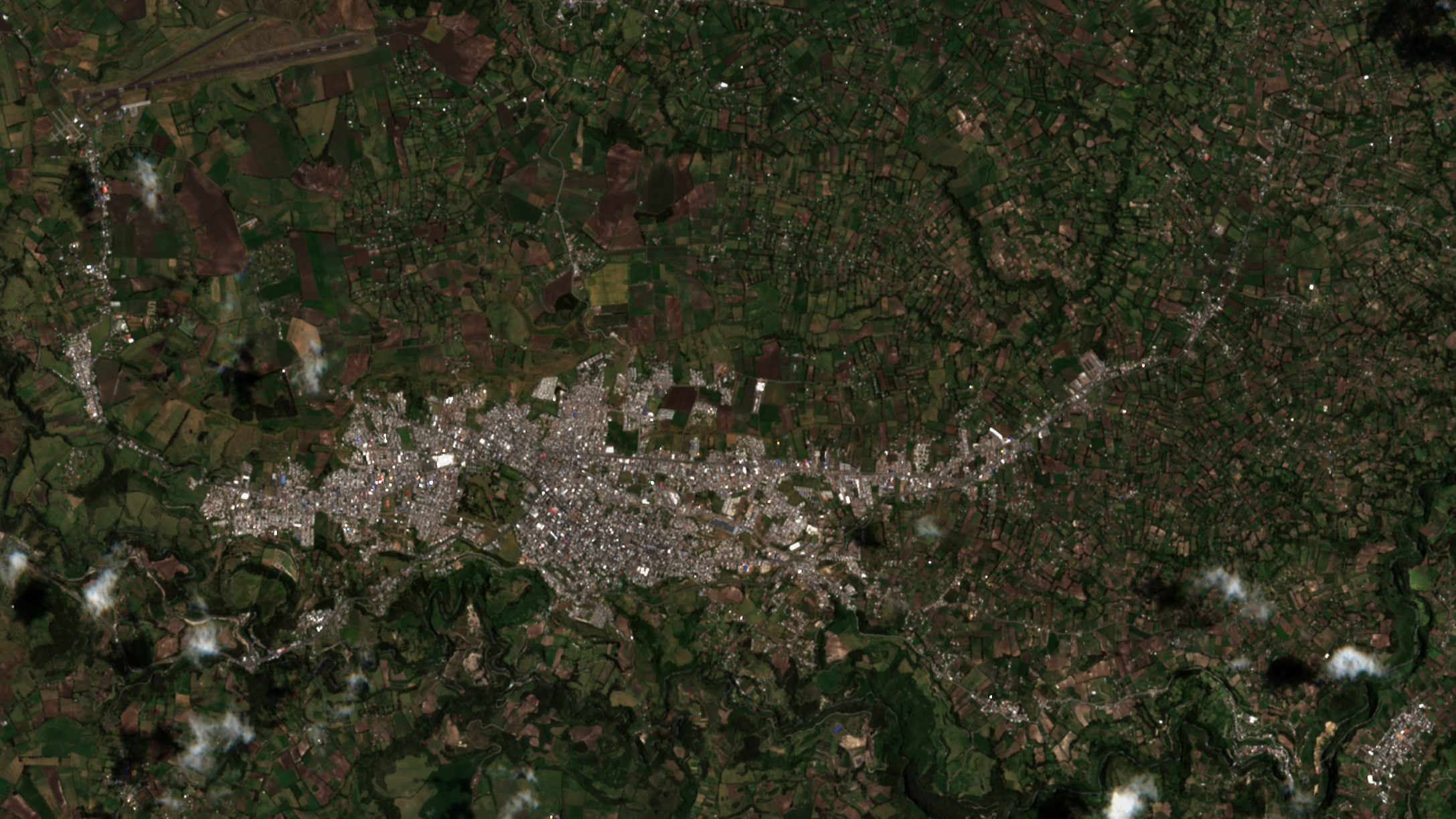
- IATA: IPI; ICAO: SKIP

Summary
- Airport type: Public
- Operator: Government
- Serves: Ipiales, Colombia
- Elevation AMSL: 9,761 ft / 2,975 m
- Coordinates: 0°51′45″N 77°40′15″W

Map
- Location of the airport in Colombia

Runways
Direction	Length		Surface
Direction	m	ft	Surface
08/26	2,500	8,202	Asphalt
- Source: WAD GCM

San Luis Airport (Spanish: Aeropuerto San Luis) (IATA: IPI, ICAO: SKIP) is a high-elevation airport serving Ipiales, a city in the Nariño Department of Colombia. The airport is 4 kilometres (2.5 mi) north of the city.

== Airlines and destinations ==
Airlines	Destinations
Avianca	Bogotá
SATENA	Bogotá, Cali

== Accidents and incidents ==
- On 22 August 1975, Douglas C-49J HK-1517E of TANA was reported to have been damaged beyond economic repair.

== See also ==
- Transport in Colombia
- List of airports in Colombia
