= Ernesto Cortissoz International Airport =

Airport serving Barranquilla, Colombia

Ernesto Cortissoz International Airport Aeropuerto Internacional Ernesto Cortissoz
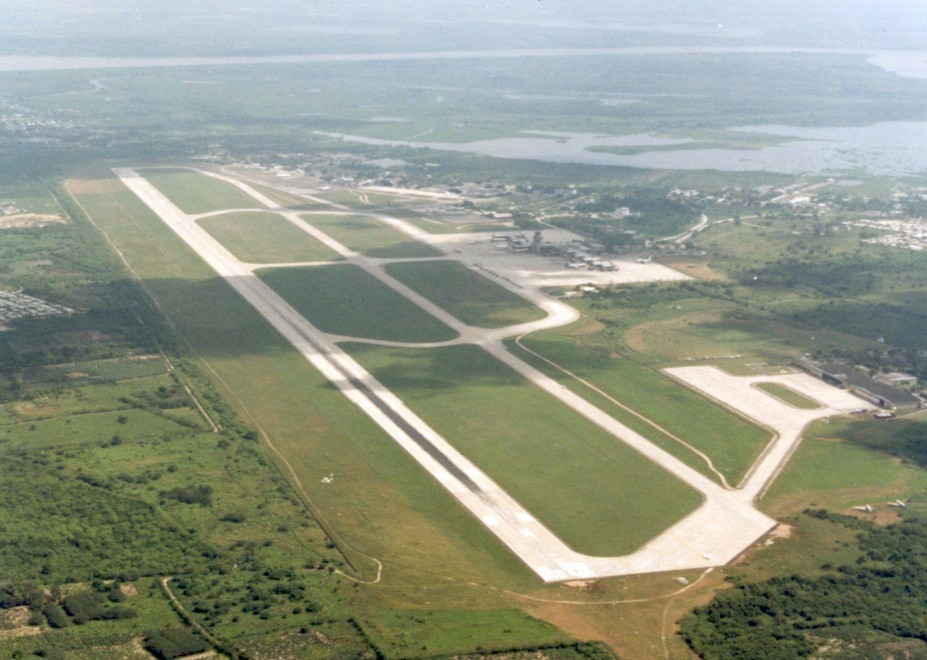
- IATA: BAQ; ICAO: SKBQ

Summary
- Airport type: Public/military
- Operator: Operadora Aeroportuaria del Caribe S.A.S. (BAQ Cortissoz)
- Serves: Barranquilla, Colombia
- Location: Soledad, Atlántico
- Opened: April 7, 1981; 45 years ago
- Focus city for: Aerosucre; Avianca
- Elevation AMSL: 30 m (98 ft)
- Coordinates: 10°53′22″N 074°46′50″W
- Website: aerobarranquilla.aerocivil.gov.co

Map
- Location of airport in Colombia

Runways
Direction	Length		Surface
Direction	m	ft	Surface
05/23	3,000	9,843	Asphalt

Statistics (2016)
- Air operations: 40,321
- Passenger movement: 2,911,703
- Cargo movement (T): 34,527
- Source: AIP Colombia at UAEAC

Ernesto Cortissoz International Airport (Spanish: Aeropuerto Internacional Ernesto Cortissoz) (IATA: BAQ, ICAO: SKBQ) is an international airport serving the area of Barranquilla, the capital city of the Atlántico department in Colombia. The airport is located in the suburban municipality of Soledad. It owes its name to one of the pioneers of Colombian aviation, Ernesto Cortissoz.

The airport serves as a focus city for Avianca, the flag carrier of Colombia. It is capable of accepting widebody aircraft such as the Boeing 747, Boeing 767, and Airbus A350. It is the most important airport in terms of infrastructure in the northern part of the country and the first in terms of cargo movements.

== Description ==
The airport is located in the municipality of Soledad, 12 km (7 mi) from the center of Barranquilla. It is capable of receiving widebody aircraft such as the Boeing 747, McDonnell Douglas DC-10, and Airbus A350. In fact, it was once the largest airport in Colombia. Currently, the airport is fifth in number of passengers and cargo in the country. The airport has two terminals: the domestic terminal, with gates 6-13, and international, with gates 1-5 and 5A. In July 2007, the Aeronautica Civil gave the airport "open skies" designation, meaning that any airline in the world could fly to Barranquilla on any route with any frequency. This action was taken largely to promote tourism as Barranquilla is a key access point to the Caribbean.

== History ==
In the early 1930s, SCADTA based its main hub at Veranillo Airport which was a seaplane port on the Magdalena River which had been operating since 1919, the year of the airline's inception. The airline operated several Fokker Universals and Sikorsky S-38s from the main terminal at the seaplane port to many different parts of Colombia. Since 1929, it had also been an important stopover point for Pan American World Airways, which operated Sikorsky S-42s to parts of Panama and Venezuela. However, during this period SCADTA was expanding its fleet to land-based aircraft, such as Ford Trimotors and Boeing 247s and the current seaplane terminal could not accommodate the new aircraft. In response to this, a new airport was planned by SCADTA to replace the seaplane terminal. When it eventually opened, the old seaplane port was sold to the government to be used as a port for the Colombian Navy.

The new aerodrome opened in 1936, located in the municipality of Soledad, Atlántico. It was thus named Soledad International Airport. The airport included a short paved runway, an office building, and a small terminal building. The two airlines operating from the airport mainly used Boeing 247s and DC-2s. By 1937, the airport was already busy, and there were not enough facilities to deal with the newer aircraft. In response to this, the airport's first hangar opened in 1938. DC-3s had been gaining in popularity at the time, and in 1939 SCADTA acquired and began operating the type. Pan Am also began flying DC-3s to the airport, and by the beginning of 1940, it became the first major air hub in the country. By the summer of 1940, SCADTA had reorganized into Avianca, and Barranquilla became its first major hub. At the dawn of commercial aviation in Colombia, airport construction was delegated to airlines wishing to serve that particular city. Thus, the construction of major airports in Colombia mainly fell to SCADTA, among these being Soledad International Airport.

Soledad Airport soon became the main center of operations and maintenance of SCADTA for their domestic operations. International services were operated by Pan American Airways, which maintained scheduled DC-3 service, later supplemented by Boeing 307 Stratoliners, to Panama City, Kingston, and Miami. In 1946, international service at Soledad Airport resumed with Avianca DC-4s, first to Miami and later to Kingston and New York.

British South American Airways also began operating to Barranquilla 1946, using Lancastrians to provide a once-weekly flight to London via Bermuda. The service took 26 hours and was referred to as "The Lightning Route to Europe". Also that year, a number of special flights with DC-4 aircraft were operated from Barranquilla to Miami and New York under contract with the airline Transocean Air Lines. KLM (Department of the West Indies) began operating in Barranquilla with DC-4 aircraft, giving passengers the opportunity to connect with scheduled flights to Curaçao, Netherlands Antilles, Jamaica, Haiti, Dominican Republic, Venezuela and Trinidad. In the early fifties LANSA inaugurated a service from Barranquilla to Havana, but never won permission to fly to Miami. However, in the sixties, TAXADER established a service to Miami, but only for a few months.

Soledad Airport soon established itself as the premier international airport in Colombia and the first hub in the country. In the mid-50s, Avianca built one of the most important aviation maintenance shops in Latin America at the airport, two large hangars that were built to house several aircraft at once. There were workshops for propellers, hydraulics, tools, electro-mechanical systems, and metal rolling. The maintenance facility also included a painting workshop, a warehouse of spare parts, and a technical school. The workshop was certified by the Civil Aeronautics Board (CAB) of the United States for the repair and overhaul of all types of domestic and foreign aircraft.

Also, in the early 1950s, a unique system was built for loading and unloading passengers and cargo from DC-4s that drastically reduced the time required by a claimed 50%. With this system, the DC-4 taxied to where it was in a certain spot and then electric carts on rails that were flush with the runway surface moved the aircraft sideways to the unloading gangways.

With the opening of the El Dorado International Airport in Bogotá in December 1959, Soledad was relegated to secondary importance in the country. It was only upon the delivery of the first Boeing 727 to Avianca in 1966 that the runway was extended. However, in order to appropriately handle modern jet airliners, and the resulting increase in passenger traffic, there became a need to build a new international airport with a more modern terminal, more stands, and larger runways and taxiways. There was hope that this project would put Barranquilla back on the map as an airport served by major international carriers.

In December 1968, the present 3,000-metre runway was constructed, and in 1969, Colombia's Law 32 (1969) renamed Barranquilla International Airport to Ernesto Cortissoz International Airport. It was dedicated to Colombian businessman and pioneer of South American commercial aviation Ernesto Cortissoz (1884 - 1924).

Finally, on the afternoon of April 7, 1981, Julio Cesar Turbay, president of the Republic, and Alvaro Uribe Velez, Chief of the Aeronáutica Civil dedicated Barranquilla's new international airport Ernesto Cortissoz. The new terminal, with an area of 35,000 square meters, along with its new control tower, apron, taxiways, and runway (now 3,000 meters long by 45m wide), were built north of the old Soledad Airport. The design was by architect Aníbal González Moreno-Ripoll and the new terminal was built by the firm Paredes, Fuentes, y Vasquez Ltda. The new terminal had seven domestic gates and four international gates each with its own waiting area. The premises of the former terminal building became the cargo area.

Formerly, the company Caribbean Airports S. A. "ACSA" was the operator of airport concession. ACSA was incorporated in the month of December 1996 and its main activity is the administration and economic exploitation of Ernesto Cortissoz International Airport. This status was granted by the State through the renewable concession contract, number 001-CON-97, concluded with the Special Administrative Unit of Civil Aeronautics for a term of 15 years. Under this contract, ACSA assumed operations on March 1, 1997. According to the contract award, administration and economic exploitation include the provision of all airport services, maintenance, and management of the terminal, runway, ramp, airport facilities, visual aids for approach and access roads. Aeronáutica Civil reserved management and responsibility for control and monitoring functions of en-route air traffic and the proper functioning of air navigation aids, including approach, communications, and other equipment intended and necessary for the proper air traffic control.

== Physical characteristics ==
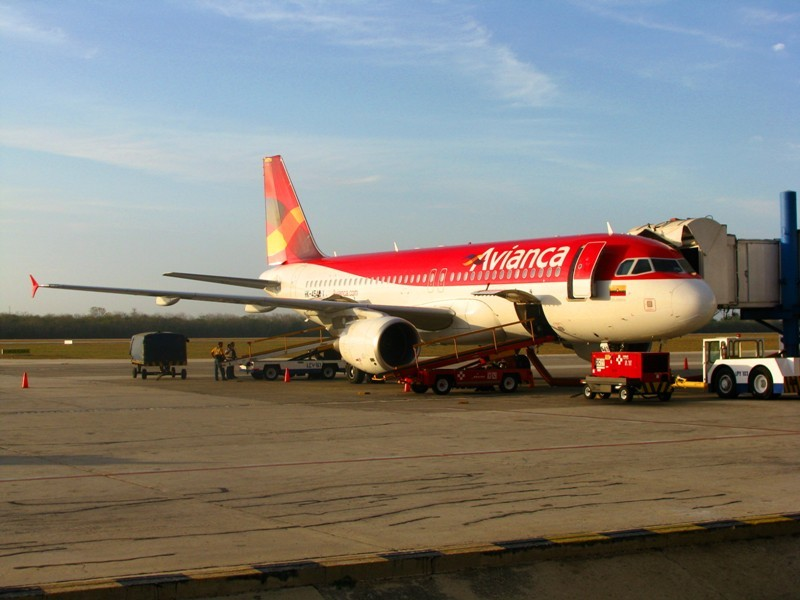
Avianca Airbus A320 at gate 5 arriving from Miami

=== Field ===
The runway is made of asphalt and has a length of 3,000 m (9,842 ft) and a width of 45 m (148 ft). The approaches to both ends of the runway are categorized for instrument flight operations in precision category I.

The airport has a taxiway parallel to the runway in order to reach both ends. The three turn-offs near the center of the runway connect with the taxiway and the ramp; they are 22.5 m wide and are made of concrete.

=== Ramps ===
The airport has three ramps for parking aircraft, they are for use by commercial passenger aircraft, cargo aircraft and military aircraft. The ramp for commercial passenger aircraft is located opposite the passenger terminal building and has 16 parking spaces. The Cargo ramp is located north of the passenger terminal, near the head of runway 23.

=== Passenger terminal ===
The airport terminal is currently undergoing renovations. Renovations were to be complete somewhere around the first quarter of 2020, but due to the COVID-19 pandemic, it has been moved. The airport has one passenger terminal building to handle all of the airport's commercial traffic. There are 36 check posts, a series of shops, including a Duty-free shop, and passenger cafes and restaurants. There are two restricted areas for passengers, depending on the destination of the flight (domestic or international). On the side for domestic flights are located the gates 6, 7, 8, 9, 10, 11, 12, and 13, each with a waiting area for passengers. For access to aircraft, four gates (6, 7, 8, and 9) have boarding bridges, each with two degrees of freedom, while aircraft at gates 10, 11, 12, and 13 are accessed by walking onto the ramp.

In the international area are gates 1, 2, 3, 4, and 5, each with a waiting area for passengers. Aircraft are accessed via jet bridges at all gates except for gate 1. The bridges at gates 2, 3, 4, and 5 have three degrees of freedom. Passengers claim their luggage in a room used for that purpose on the first level, it has two conveyor belts. International passengers receive their luggage in this same room after passing through the immigration area. After leaving the terminal building you can access the public area which houses the offices of rental car companies and the taxi waiting area.

=== Cargo terminal ===
The cargo terminal is the former passenger terminal building, located northeast of the passenger terminal and with an area of 9,000 m^{2}. The loading dock can accommodate up to two aircraft simultaneously. Current use of the cargo terminal does not exceed 30% capacity.

== Airlines and destinations ==
=== Passenger ===
Airlines	Destinations
Air Europa	Madrid (begins December 18, 2026)
American Airlines	Miami
Avianca	Bogotá, Cali, Fort Lauderdale, Medellín–JMC, Miami, New York–JFK (resumes February 2, 2027)
Clic	Medellín–Olaya Herrera, Montería, Valledupar
Copa Airlines	Panama City–Tocumen
JetBlue	Fort Lauderdale
JetSmart Colombia	Bogotá, Medellín–JMC
LATAM Colombia	Bogotá, Medellín–JMC, San Andrés Island
SATENA	Aguachica, Cúcuta, Medellín–Olaya Herrera, Riohacha
Wingo	Aruba, Bogotá, Bucaramanga, Medellín–JMC, Panama City–Balboa, San Andrés Island
Z Air	Curaçao

== Incidents ==
- On September 30, 1975, a Boeing 727 operated by Avianca Cargo crashed on final approach due to poor visibility. All four crewmembers were killed.
- On March 17, 1995, an Intercontinental DC-9 was destroyed by fire while it was parked in the apron, no one was on the plane.
- On November 19, 2006, a DC-10 operated by Cielos Airlines overran the runway while landing in bad weather, All 6 crew were injured.
- On November 21, 2006, Avianca Flight 9522, which was inbound from Bogotá, also overran the runway. All 135 people survived.
- On August 23, 2008, Aires Flight 0051 was inbound from Curaçao when it overran the runway because a problem with a landing gear. All 25 people survived.
