= Olaya Herrera Airport =

Secondary airport in Medellín, Colombia

Olaya Herrera Airport Aeropuerto Olaya Herrera
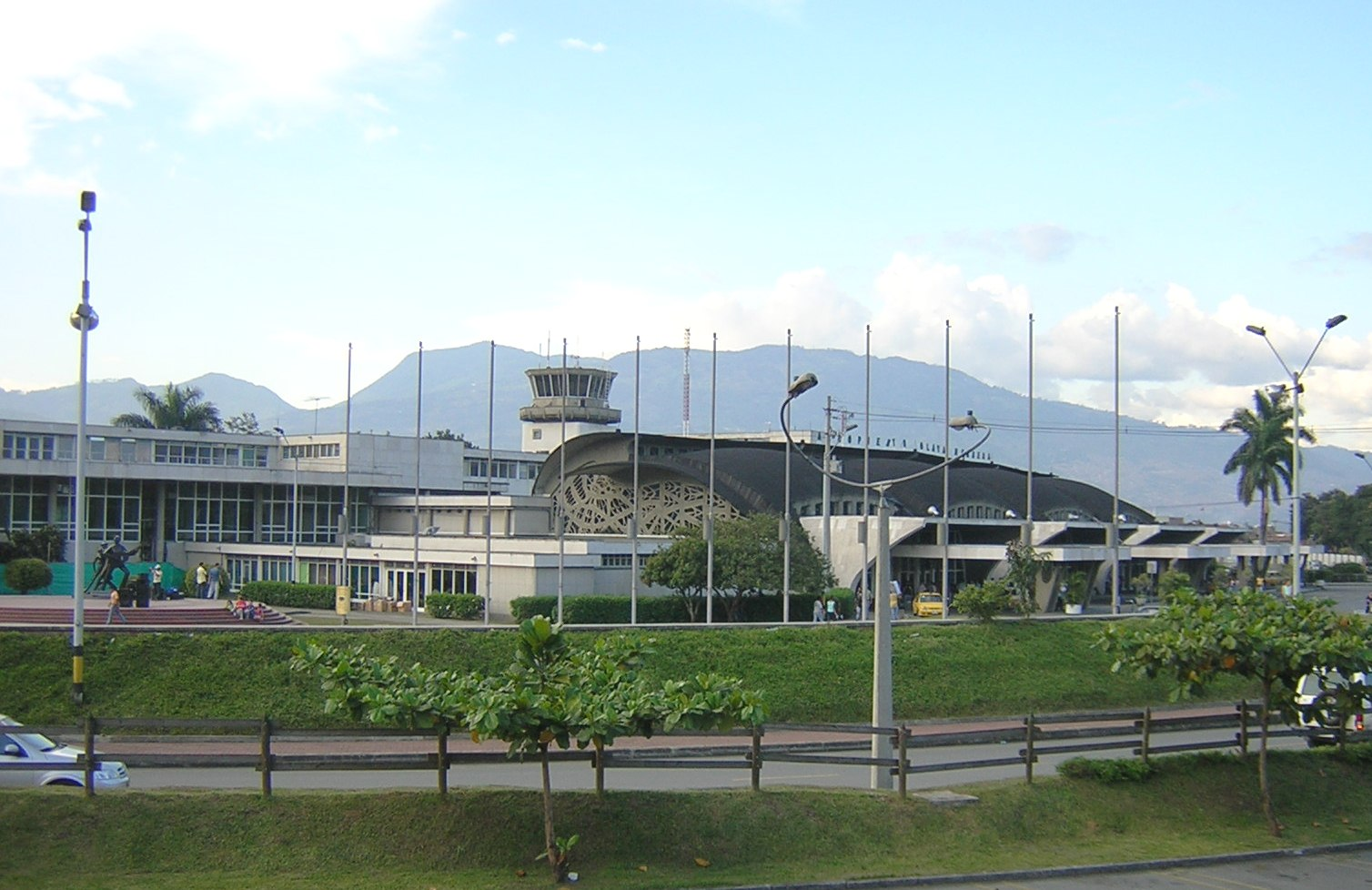
- IATA: EOH; ICAO: SKMD

Summary
- Airport type: Public
- Operator: Grupo Aeroportuario del Sureste
- Serves: Medellín Metropolitan Area
- Location: Medellín, Colombia
- Opened: July 5, 1932; 94 years ago
- Hub for: EasyFly; SATENA
- Elevation AMSL: 4,921 ft (1,500 m)
- Coordinates: 06°13′11″N 75°35′25″W
- Website: www.aeropuertoolayaherrera.gov.co

Map
- Location of airport in Colombia

Runways
Direction	Length		Surface
Direction	m	ft	Surface
02/20	2,500	8,202	Asphalt

Statistics (2024)
- Total Passengers: 1,274,857
- Source: Grupo Aeroportuario del Sureste

Olaya Herrera Airport (Spanish: Aeropuerto Olaya Herrera) (IATA: EOH, ICAO: SKMD) is an airport located in Medellín, Colombia, that serves regional and domestic flights. Additionally, the airport is used by general aviation and features several hangars for charters.

It was formerly known as Medellin International Airport prior to the opening of José María Córdova International Airport in August 1985, which is located in the nearby municipality of Rionegro, 19 kilometres (12 mi) east of Medellin. Between the two airports, there were more than 3.5 million passengers per year, which makes it the second busiest passenger city in Colombia after Bogotá.

In 2024, the airport handled 1,274,857 passengers, making it the 12th busiest airport in Colombia.

== History ==
Colombian businessman Gonzalo Mejía saw an opportunity for the development of an airport in Medellin, given that the mountainous topography surrounding the city made land transport to and from the area difficult, and that the nearest airport was in Puerto Berrio. He secured financing from wealthy businessmen, chose the land where the airport sits today and overcame obstacles imposed by the local government. He founded Uraba, Medellin and Central Airways and established it as a subsidiary of Pan American Airways, which at the time had the prospect of becoming the dominant player in global aviation. The airport opened on July 5, 1932, and was named after the then president of Colombia, Enrique Olaya Herrera, who had supported Mejía and his idea of an airport in Medellin.

In the 1940s the city was growing rapidly and new aircraft of the time required better facilities. Therefore, Mejía signed a contract in 1945 for the expansion of the runway and the existing facilities, a work that was completed on May 1, 1947.

In the 1970s, the airport was again over capacity and unable to meet demand, so the construction of new and larger José María Córdova International Airport in the nearby locality of Rionegro was announced. This resulted in the closure of Olaya Herrera Airport in 1986, a year after the new airport opened, and the reallocation of its land to a park. However, many people asked for the airport to remain open, and in 1991, it reopened with only domestic flights after a ruling by Aerocivil. In the same year it closed, the airport saw some improvements as a result of Pope John Paul II's visit to the city in July. The visit also inspired the name for the park which remains on the western portion of the airport grounds: the Aeroparque Juan Pablo II.

It was also one of the mainstays of carrier ACES from its beginnings to its demise in August 2003.

Today it is an airport with heavy use and constant growth (second in number of operations in Colombia) and was declared a national monument on October 19, 1995, for its historical, cultural, and architectural value for the city of Medellin and Colombia. In 2008, the national government gave the airport and five others in Colombia under concession to operating company Airplan, which is conducting a series of renovations to the terminal (at the time of writing they are ongoing).

With an investment of more than US$27 million, Airplan began the transformation under the parameters defined in its concession contract with the Aeronáutuica Public Establecimeinto Olaya Herrera. The modernization plan began in March 2009 and ends in 2014. Among the main objectives are to ensure aviation safety, passenger comfort, and meeting the requirements of ICAO, Aerocivil, and IATA. Olaya Herrera Airport operational spaces have Category B, according to IATA.

== Structure and capacity ==
There are restrictions on the types of aircraft operating from the airport due to its classification as regional airport. Commercial flights can operate aircraft of up to 50 passengers, with the exception of Satena, which operates Embraer 170 aircraft carrying up to 76 passengers.

The passenger terminal has two waiting rooms off the main aircraft apron (which has a capacity of over 30 aircraft). It also has a shopping area with banking establishments, offices and shops, a food court, 11 double counters, airline check-in, a smoking room, and close connection with the Plaza Gardel.

The airport has 111 hangars located south of the terminal, where the executive offices of several commercial, charter, and cargo airlines, as well as flight schools can also be found. AIRES Colombia built a hangar on the north end of the airport in order to service aircraft and reaffirm their commitment to Medellin and the new base of operations at the airport. Flight schools Aviation Antioqueña Academy and the Falcons School of Aviation, operate from the hangar area as well.

Along with five other airports, Olaya Herrera Airport was given in concession to private operator Airplan to manage. The proposed works include a total refurbishment of the terminal, the construction of a cargo terminal, repairing the track platform, implementing new security systems, the expansion and refurbishment of waiting rooms and baggage claim belts, construction of a new control tower on the west side, construction of a business aviation terminal that will serve domestic and international flights of this type (with the intention of encouraging the return of international flights to the airport), new shopping areas, among others.

Aerolínea de Antioquia has its headquarters on the airport property and has six hangars to store and perform maintenance on their planes. West Caribbean Airways, when it existed, had its corporate headquarters, operational center, and call center in Hangar 73 on the airport grounds.

== Airlines and destinations ==
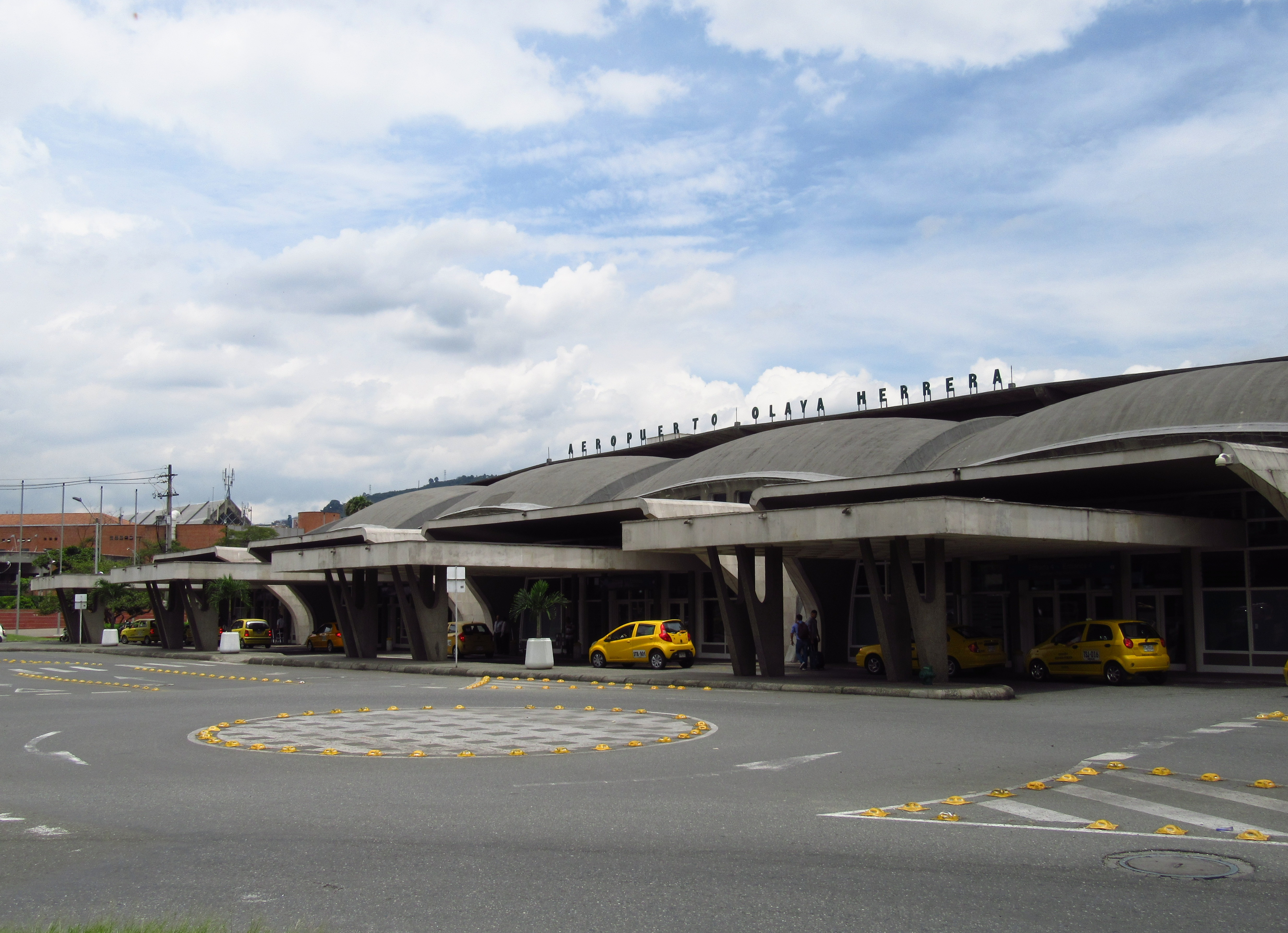
Entrance of the airport.

Airlines	Destinations
Clic	Apartadó, Armenia, Bahía Solano, Barranquilla, Bogotá, Bucaramanga, Cali, Corozal, Cúcuta, Ibague, Montería, Neiva, Pereira, Quibdó, Tolu, Valledupar, Villavicencio; Seasonal: Cartagena (begins 18 December 2026)
Pacifica de Aviacion	Bahía Solano, Capurganá, Caucasia, Nuquí
SATENA	Acandí, Apartadó, Bahía Solano, Barranquilla, Bogotá, Bucaramanga, Buenaventura, Caucasia, Condoto, Mompox, Ocaña, Paipa, Quibdó, San Gil, Tolú
SEARCA	Capurganá; Seasonal: Condoto, Quibdó

== Historical airlines and destinations ==
A list of services before the inauguration of José María Córdova International Airport in 1985.

Airlines	Destinations
ALM Antillean Airlines	Curaçao
Avianca	Barrancabermeja, Barranquilla, Bogotá, Bucaramanga, Cali, Caracas, Cartagena, Manizales, Miami, Montería, New York–JFK, Panama City, Pereira, San Andrés Island, Santa Marta
Copa Airlines	Panama City
Intercontinental de Aviación	Bogotá
SAM Colombia	Barrancabermeja, Barranquilla, Bogotá, Cali, Cartagena

== Accidents and incidents ==
- On 24 June 1935, Argentinian tango singer Carlos Gardel, Alfredo Le Pera, Guillermo Barbieri and 14 others were killed in a collision between two Ford Trimotor airplanes at the airport.
- On 1 March 1950, a C-47 (registration HK-507) operated by SAM crashed during approach to the airport after encountering adverse weather conditions. The aircraft was returning to the airport after a test flight following repairs to the left engine. During the approach, however, the airplane lost altitude due to severe weather and the left wing impacted a house causing the left engine to detach and the aircraft to plummet to the ground a few hundred meters short of the runway. The co-pilot and a mechanic on board the aircraft perished on impact.
- On 13 June 1951, a C-47 (registration HK-504) operated by SAM took off from the airport for a cargo flight to Cartagena but crashed minutes later while attempting to return to the airport after experiencing technical problems. The 2-man crew and one person on the ground perished in the incident.
- On 14 December 1983, a TAMPA Colombia Boeing 707 crashed on takeoff from the airport. All three people died, along with 22 on the ground.
- On 31 March 1991, a Vickers Viscount (registration HK-1708) of Intercontinental de Aviación made an emergency landing at the airport after experiencing an instrument failure during a cargo flight from El Dorado International Airport in Bogotá to Gustavo Rojas Pinilla International Airport on the Caribbean island of San Andrés. While cruising at 16,000 feet (4,900 m) both artificial horizons failed during turbulence and control of the aircraft was only regained at 4,000 feet (1,200 m). Inspection after landing revealed structural damage beyond economic repair, probably caused by a gear collapse suffered previously on 14 February 1988.
- On 30 November 1996, ACES Flight 148 bound to Bahía Solano with a stopover in Quibdó (Chocó) stalled and crashed into a mountain after takeoff. Of the 15 people on board, 14 died in the crash. The cause of the stall and the subsequent crash was found to be the aircraft being overloaded.
- On 15 October 2004, a Douglas DC-3C (registration HK-1504) belonging to carrier Aerovanguardia flew into electricity lines and crashed near Medellín on approach to Olaya Herrera Airport while performing a domestic cargo flight from La Vanguardia Airport, Villavicencio to José María Córdova International Airport, Medellín. The flight had been diverted to Olaya Herrera as alternate due to fog. The three crew were killed.
- On 18 February 2009, a Basler BT-67 (registration PNC-0211) of the Colombian National Police was destroyed by the accidental detonation of a number of hand grenades. Eight people were injured, four of them seriously. The aircraft was due to fly 25 police officers to El Caraño Airport, Quibdó.
- On 2 July 2013, two passengers on board an ADA flight attempted to rob someone outside the plane who allegedly had large sums of money and some kilograms of gold. Police started shooting at the assailants on the runway when they found out what was happening. Eventually three people were arrested. The incident caused the airport to be closed for around 45 minutes.

== See also ==
- José María Córdova International Airport
- Medellín
- Transport in Colombia
- List of airports in Colombia
