= Juan H. White Airport =

Caucasia Airport Juan H. White Airport Aeropuerto Juan H. White
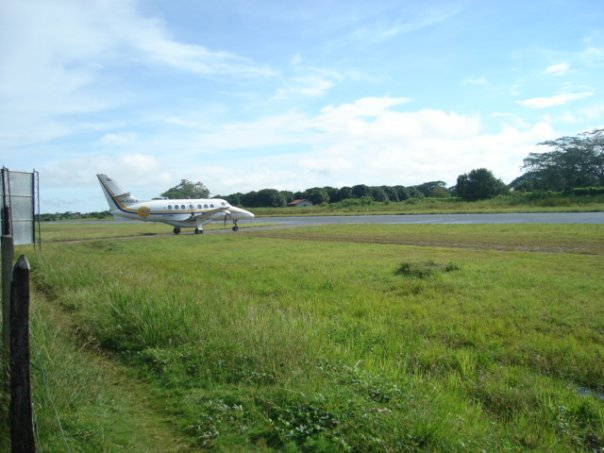
- IATA: CAQ; ICAO: SKCU

Summary
- Airport type: Public
- Operator: Government
- Location: Caucasia, Colombia
- Elevation AMSL: 174 ft (53 m)
- Coordinates: 7°58′05″N 075°11′53″W

Map
- Location within Antioquia Department Location within Colombia

Runways
Direction	Length		Surface
Direction	m	ft	Surface
01/19	1,160	3,806	Asphalt
- Source: WAD GCM Google Maps

Caucasia Airport or Juan H. White Airport (Spanish: Aeropuerto Juan H. White) (IATA: CAQ, ICAO: SKCU) is an airport serving Caucasia, a city and municipality of the Antioquia Department in Colombia.

The runway is on the south edge of the town. Both are on the west bank of the Cauca River.

The Montelibano non-directional beacon (Ident: MLB) is located 12.1 nautical miles (22.4 km) west-northwest of the airport.

== Airlines and destinations ==
Airlines	Destinations
Pacifica de Aviacion	Medellín–Olaya Herrera
SATENA	Medellín–Olaya Herrera

== See also ==
- Transport in Colombia
- List of airports in Colombia
