= El Caraño Airport =

El Caraño Airport Aeropuerto El Caraño
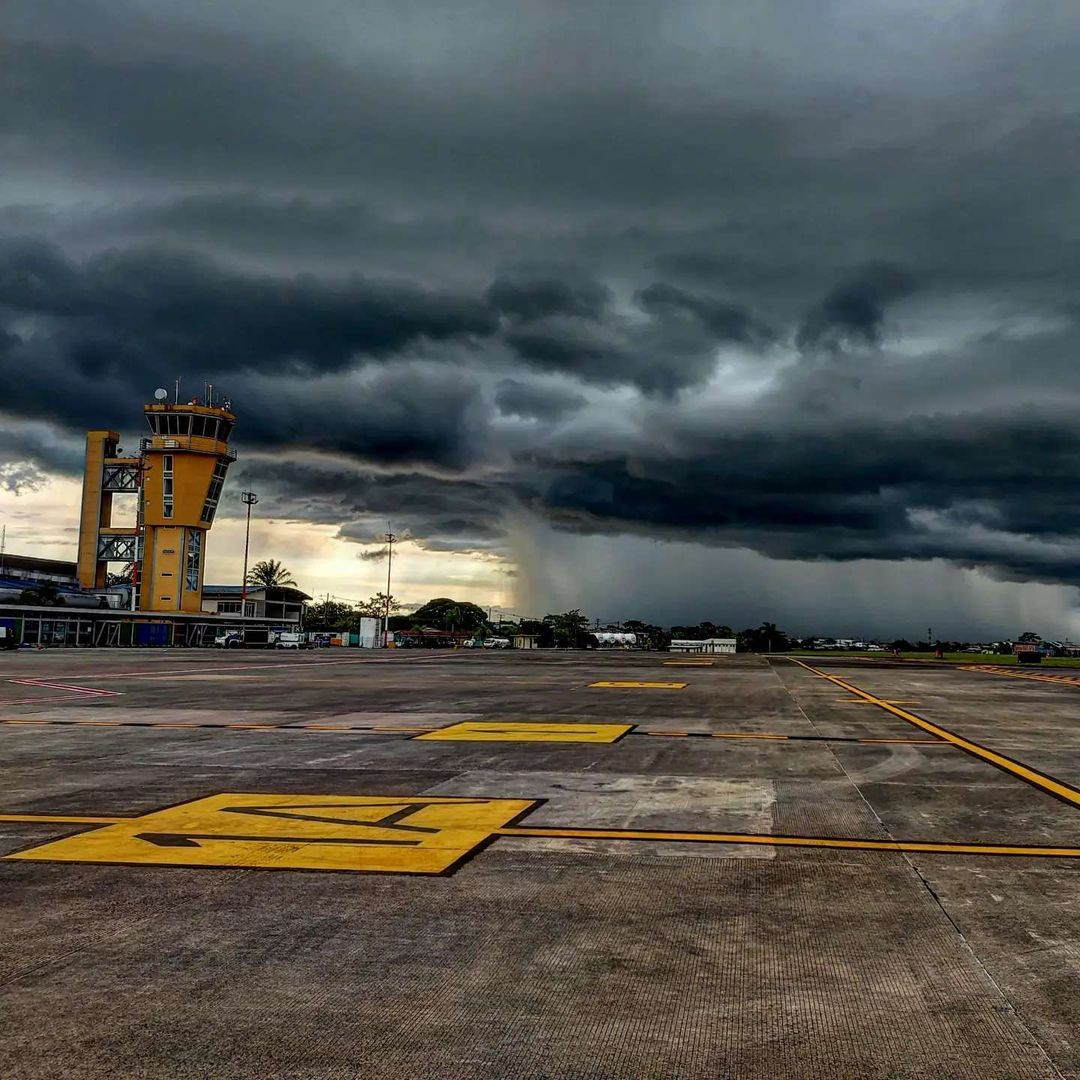
- IATA: UIB; ICAO: SKUI

Summary
- Airport type: Public
- Location: Quibdó, Colombia
- Elevation AMSL: 204 ft (62 m)
- Coordinates: 5°41′27″N 76°38′28″W

Map
- Location of airport in Colombia

Runways
Direction	Length		Surface
Direction	m	ft	Surface
13/31	1,800	5,906	Asphalt

Statistics (2023)
- Total passengers: 353,504
- Source: Grupo Aeroportuario del Sureste

El Caraño Airport (IATA: UIB, ICAO: SKUI) is an airport serving Quibdó in the Chocó Department of Colombia. In 2016, the airport handled 368,920 passengers, and 347,208 in 2017.

== Airlines and destinations ==
Airlines	Destinations
Avianca	Bogotá
Clic	Bogotá, Cali, Medellín–Olaya Herrera
Pacifica de Aviacion	Bahía Solano, Bajo Baudo, Nuquí
SATENA	Bahía Solano, Cali, Cartago, Medellín–Olaya Herrera, Nuquí

== See also ==
- Transport in Colombia
- List of airports in Colombia
