= La Florida Airport (Colombia) =

La Florida Airport Aeropuerto La Florida
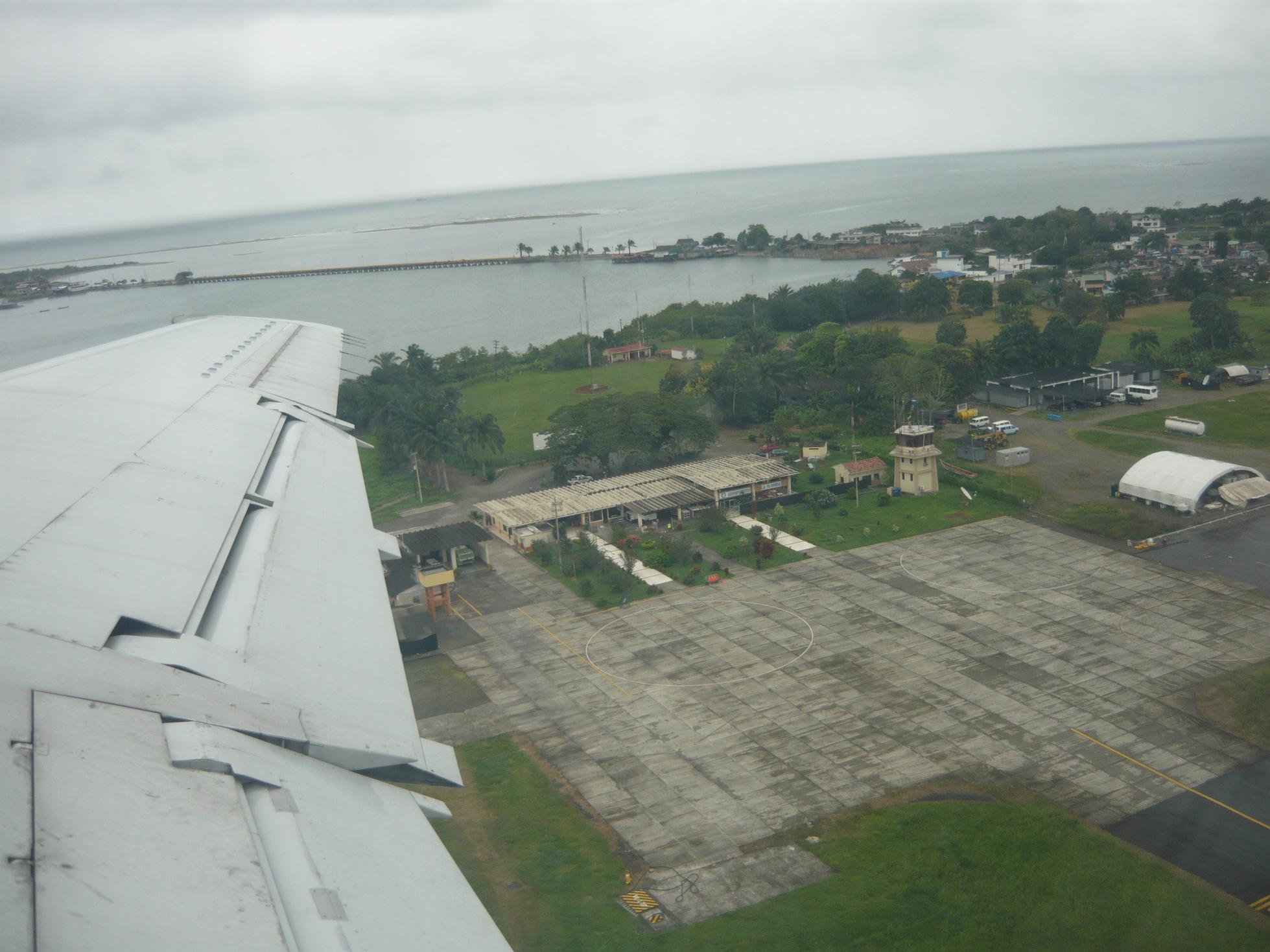
- IATA: TCO; ICAO: SKCO

Summary
- Airport type: Public
- Operator: Government
- Location: Tumaco, Colombia
- Elevation AMSL: 23 ft / 7 m
- Coordinates: 1°48′50″N 78°45′00″W

Map
- Location of airport in Colombia

Runways
Direction	Length		Surface
Direction	m	ft	Surface
06/24	1,600	5,249	Asphalt
- Source: WAD GCM

La Florida Airport (IATA: TCO, ICAO: SKCO) is an airport serving the Pacific coast city of Tumaco in the Nariño Department of Colombia. The airport is on an island connected to the mainland through a series of bridges.

== Airlines and destinations ==
Airlines	Destinations
Clic	Cali
SATENA	Cali

== See also ==
- Transport in Colombia
- List of airports in Colombia
