= List of the busiest airports in Colombia =

This is a list of the busiest airports in Colombia, ranked by annual passenger traffic.

== 2024 ==
=== Colombia's 16 busiest airports by passenger traffic ===
Rank	Airport	Location	Total passengers	Annual change	Rank change
1	El Dorado International Airport	Bogotá	45'802,360	▲TBD%	Steady
2	José María Córdova International Airport	Medellín	13'403,710	▲TBD%	Steady
3	Rafael Núñez International Airport	Cartagena	7'434,770	▲TBD%	▲1
4	Alfonso Bonilla Aragón International Airport	Cali	6'716,970	▲TBD%	▼1
5	Simón Bolívar International Airport	Santa Marta	3'617,871	▲TBD%	▲1
6	Ernesto Cortissoz International Airport	Barranquilla	3'355,362	▲TBD%	▼1
7	Matecaña International Airport	Pereira	2'781,056	▲TBD%	Steady
8	Gustavo Rojas Pinilla International Airport	San Andrés	2'386,404	▲TBD%	Steady
9	Palonegro International Airport	Bucaramanga	2'177,594	▲TBD%	Steady
10	Camilo Daza International Airport	Cúcuta	1'612,564	▲TBD%	Steady
11	Los Garzones Airport	Montería	1'442,940	▲TBD%	▲1
12	Enrique Olaya Herrera Airport	Medellín	1'274,857	▲TBD%	▼1
13	Antonio Narino Airport	Pasto	810,179	▲TBD%	Steady
14	El Eden Airport	Armenia	779,938	▲TBD%	Steady
15	Almirante Padilla Airport	Riohacha	619,270	▲TBD%	Steady
16	Alfonso Lopez Airport	Valledupar	468,005	▲TBD%	Steady

== 2023 ==
=== Colombia's 16 busiest airports by passenger traffic ===
Rank	Airport	Location	Total passengers	Annual change	Rank change
1	El Dorado International Airport	Bogotá	39'483,621	▲TBD%	Steady
2	José María Córdova International Airport	Medellín	11'871,959	▲TBD%	Steady
3	Alfonso Bonilla Aragón International Airport	Cali	6'615,106	▲TBD%	Steady
4	Rafael Núñez International Airport	Cartagena	6'388,147	▲TBD%	Steady
5	Ernesto Cortissoz International Airport	Barranquilla	3'177,309	▲TBD%	▲1
6	Simón Bolívar International Airport	Santa Marta	2'826,634	▲TBD%	▼1
7	Matecaña International Airport	Pereira	2'209,127	▲TBD%	▲1
8	Gustavo Rojas Pinilla International Airport	San Andrés	2'092,375	▲TBD%	▼1
9	Palonegro International Airport	Bucaramanga	2'087,769	▲TBD%	Steady
10	Camilo Daza International Airport	Cúcuta	1'554,686	▲TBD%	Steady
11	Enrique Olaya Herrera Airport	Medellín	1'308,606	▲TBD%	▲1
12	Los Garzones Airport	Montería	1'269,703	▲TBD%	▼1
13	Antonio Narino Airport	Pasto	816,486	▲TBD%	Steady
14	El Eden Airport	Armenia	662,234	▲TBD%	Steady
15	Almirante Padilla Airport	Riohacha	507,178	▲TBD%	Steady
16	Alfonso Lopez Airport	Valledupar	471,144	▲TBD%	Steady

== 2022 ==
=== Colombia's 15 busiest airports by passenger traffic ===
Rank	Airport	Location	Total passengers	Annual change	Rank change
1	El Dorado International Airport	Bogotá	34'317,789	▲TBD%	Steady
2	José María Córdova International Airport	Medellín	12'494,191	▲TBD%	Steady
3	Alfonso Bonilla Aragón International Airport	Cali	6'846,884	▲TBD%	Steady
4	Rafael Núñez International Airport	Cartagena	6'580,754	▲TBD%	Steady
5	Simón Bolívar International Airport	Santa Marta	3'416,366	▲TBD%	Steady
6	Ernesto Cortissoz International Airport	Barranquilla	2'974,379	▲TBD%	▲1
7	Gustavo Rojas Pinilla International Airport	San Andrés	2'632,304	▲TBD%	▼1
8	Matecaña International Airport	Pereira	2'552,868	▲TBD%	Steady
9	Palonegro International Airport	Bucaramanga	2'097,040	▲TBD%	Steady
10	Camilo Daza International Airport	Cúcuta	1'636,057	▲TBD%	▲2
11	Los Garzones Airport	Montería	1'538,189	▲TBD%	▼1
12	Enrique Olaya Herrera Airport	Medellín	1'121,157	▲TBD%	▼1
13	Antonio Narino Airport	Pasto	693,216	▲TBD%	▲1
14	El Eden Airport	Armenia	637,421	▲TBD%	▼1
15	Alfonso Lopez Airport	Valledupar	496,861	▲TBD%	▲2
16	El Carano Airport	Quibdo	344,425	▲TBD%	Steady

== 2021 ==
=== Colombia's 15 busiest airports by passenger traffic ===
Rank	Airport	Location	Total passengers	Annual change	Rank change
1	El Dorado International Airport	Bogotá	22,091,112	▲104.24%	Steady
2	José María Córdova International Airport	Medellín	7'916,646	▲158.04%	Steady
3	Alfonso Bonilla Aragón International Airport	Cali	5'211,765	▲166.45%	Steady
4	Rafael Núñez International Airport	Cartagena	4'455787	▲137.06%	Steady
5	Simón Bolívar International Airport	Santa Marta	2'552,810	▲223.02%	▲1
6	Gustavo Rojas Pinilla International Airport	San Andrés	2'440,909	▲222.55%	▲1
7	Ernesto Cortissoz International Airport	Barranquilla	2'193,236	▲117.89%	▼2
8	Matecaña International Airport	Pereira	1'651.429	▲166.27%	▲1
9	Palonegro International Airport	Bucaramanga	1'311,574	▲106.64%	▼1
10	Los Garzones Airport	Montería	1'091,313	▲161.33%	▲1
11	Enrique Olaya Herrera Airport	Medellín	1'065,717	▲115.66%	▼1
12	Camilo Daza International Airport	Cúcuta	1'003,445	▲157.53%	Steady
13	El Eden Airport	Armenia	333,021	▲102.41%	Steady
14	Antonio Narino Airport	Pasto	310,981	▲165.19%	▲1
15	El Carano Airport	Quibdo	300,180	▲100%+	New entry

== 2020 ==
=== Colombia's 15 busiest airports by passenger traffic ===
Rank	Airport	Location	Total passengers	Annual change	Rank change
1	El Dorado International Airport	Bogotá	10,816,372	▼69.09%	Steady
2	José María Córdova International Airport	Medellín	3,085,601	▼66.48%	Steady
3	Alfonso Bonilla Aragón International Airport	Cali	1,955,998	▼64.61%	▲1
4	Rafael Núñez International Airport	Cartagena	1,879,635	▼66.81%	▼1
5	Ernesto Cortissoz International Airport	Barranquilla	1,006,573	▼63.80%	Steady
6	Simón Bolívar International Airport	Santa Marta	790,298	▼66.24%	▲1
7	Gustavo Rojas Pinilla International Airport	San Andrés	756,766	▼68.88%	▼1
8	Palonegro International Airport	Bucaramanga	634,720	▼65.96%	Steady
9	Matecaña International Airport	Pereira	620,198	▼66.13%	Steady
10	Enrique Olaya Herrera Airport	Medellín	494,176	▼54.41%	Steady
11	Los Garzones Airport	Montería	417,602	▼58.82%	▲1
12	Camilo Daza International Airport	Cúcuta	389,642	▼63.31%	▼1
13	El Eden Airport	Armenia	164,532	▼64.47%	▲1
14	Alfonso Lopez Airport	Valledupar	133,777	▼70.80%	▲1
15	Antonio Narino Airport	Pasto	117,267	▼64.85%	New entry

== 2019 ==
=== Colombia's 15 busiest airports by passenger traffic ===
Rank	Airport	Location	Total passengers	Annual change	Rank change
1	El Dorado International Airport	Bogotá	34'975,000	▲6.90%	Steady
2	José María Córdova International Airport	Medellín	9'205,009	▲14.54%	Steady
3	Rafael Núñez International Airport	Cartagena	5'663,946	▲4.78%	Steady
4	Alfonso Bonilla Aragón International Airport	Cali	5'527,532	▲13.49%	Steady
5	Ernesto Cortissoz International Airport	Barranquilla	2'780,631	▲7.68%	Steady
6	Gustavo Rojas Pinilla International Airport	San Andrés	2'431,766	▲11.11%	Steady
7	Simón Bolívar International Airport	Santa Marta	2'340,992	▲17.16%	Steady
8	Palonegro International Airport	Bucaramanga	1'864,469	▲14.85%	▲1
9	Matecaña International Airport	Pereira	1'831,170	▲2.04%	▼1
10	Enrique Olaya Herrera Airport	Medellín	1'084,008	▼6.44%	Steady
11	Camilo Daza International Airport	Cúcuta	1'061,961	▲14.81%	▲1
12	Los Garzones Airport	Montería	1'014,170	▲8.88%	▼1
13	Vanguardia Airport	Villavicencio	471,134	▲142.82%	▲3
14	El Eden Airport	Armenia	463,104	▲16.91%	Steady
15	Alfonso Lopez Airport	Valledupar	458,108	▲15.08%	▼2

== 2018 ==
=== Colombia's 15 busiest airports by passenger traffic ===
Rank	Airport	Location	Total passengers	Annual change	Rank change
1	El Dorado International Airport	Bogotá	32,716,468	▲5.60%	Steady
2	José María Córdova International Airport	Medellín	8,036,411	▲5.50%	Steady
3	Rafael Núñez International Airport	Cartagena	5,405,362	▲14.80%	▲1
4	Alfonso Bonilla Aragón International Airport	Cali	4,870,311	▼-3.00%	▼1
5	Ernesto Cortissoz International Airport	Barranquilla	2,582,290	▲0.20%	Steady
6	Gustavo Rojas Pinilla International Airport	San Andrés	2,188,527	▼6.40%	Steady
7	Simón Bolívar International Airport	Santa Marta	1,998,099	▲18.10%	Steady
8	Matecaña International Airport	Pereira	1,794,603	▲16.40%	▲1
9	Palonegro International Airport	Bucaramanga	1,623,405	▲3.30%	▼1
10	Enrique Olaya Herrera Airport	Medellín	1,158,701	▲8.20%	Steady
11	Los Garzones Airport	Montería	931,449	▼0.90%	Steady
12	Camilo Daza International Airport	Cúcuta	924,989	▲5.1%	Steady
13	Alfonso Lopez Airport	Valledupar	398,063	▲2.50%	▲1
14	El Eden Airport	Armenia	396,110	▼8.10%	▼1
15	El Carano Airport	Quibdo	366,517	▼1.80%	Steady

== 2017 ==
=== Colombia's 15 busiest airports by passenger traffic ===
Rank	Airport	Location	Total passengers	Annual change	Rank change
1	El Dorado International Airport	Bogotá	30,989,632	▼0.17%	Steady
2	José María Córdova International Airport	Medellín	7,619,740	▼0.84%	Steady
3	Alfonso Bonilla Aragón International Airport	Cali	5,020,796	▼10.19%	Steady
4	Rafael Núñez International Airport	Cartagena	4,708,709	▲7.55%	Steady
5	Ernesto Cortissoz International Airport	Barranquilla	2,576,253	▼11.52%	Steady
6	Gustavo Rojas Pinilla International Airport	San Andrés	2,337,427	▲10.07%	Steady
7	Simón Bolívar International Airport	Santa Marta	1'691,538	▲10.69%	▲2
8	Palonegro International Airport	Bucaramanga	1,571,604	▼10.38%	▼1
9	Matecaña International Airport	Pereira	1,541,340	▲0.61%	▼1
10	Enrique Olaya Herrera Airport	Medellín	1,070,478	▼1.94%	Steady
11	Los Garzones Airport	Montería	939,954	▼1.90%	▲1
12	Camilo Daza International Airport	Cúcuta	880,329	▼17.48%	▼1
13	El Eden Airport	Armenia	430,997	▼9.04%	Steady
14	Alfonso Lopez Airport	Valledupar	388,487	▼6.17%	Steady
15	El Carano Airport	Quibdo	373,357	▼6.97%	Steady

== 2016 ==
=== Colombia's 15 busiest airports by passenger traffic ===
Rank	Airport	Location	Total passengers	Annual change	Rank change
1	El Dorado International Airport	Bogotá	31,041,841	▲3.62%	Steady
2	José María Córdova International Airport	Medellín	7,684,593	▲11.31%	Steady
3	Alfonso Bonilla Aragón International Airport	Cali	5,590,518	▲9.14%	Steady
4	Rafael Núñez International Airport	Cartagena	4,378,058	▲12.30%	Steady
5	Ernesto Cortissoz International Airport	Barranquilla	2,911,703	▲5.63%	Steady
7	Gustavo Rojas Pinilla International Airport	San Andrés	2,123,597	▲8.93%	Steady
6	Palonegro International Airport	Bucaramanga	1,753,651	▼4.69%	Steady
8	Matecaña International Airport	Pereira	1,532,012	▼0.11%	Steady
9	Simón Bolívar International Airport	Santa Marta	1'528,188	▲4.88%	Steady
10	Enrique Olaya Herrera Airport	Medellín	1,091,622	▲0.35%	Steady
11	Camilo Daza International Airport	Cúcuta	1,066,869	▼8.30%	Steady
12	Los Garzones Airport	Montería	958,199	▲7.45%	Steady
13	El Eden Airport	Armenia	473,853	▼2.17%	Steady
14	Alfonso Lopez Airport	Valledupar	414,015	▼8.91%	▲2
15	El Carano Airport	Quibdo	401,326	▲7.56%	Steady

== 2015 ==
=== Colombia's 15 busiest airports by passenger traffic ===
Rank	Airport	Location	Total passengers	Annual change	Rank change
1	El Dorado International Airport	Bogotá	29,956,551	▲9.21%	Steady
2	José María Córdova International Airport	Medellín	6,903,820	▲5.64%	Steady
3	Alfonso Bonilla Aragón International Airport	Cali	5,122,389	▲8.97%	Steady
4	Rafael Núñez International Airport	Cartagena	3,898,628	▲15.05%	Steady
5	Ernesto Cortissoz International Airport	Barranquilla	2,756,389	▲15.22%	Steady
7	Gustavo Rojas Pinilla International Airport	San Andrés	1,949,535	▲29.92%	▲1
6	Palonegro International Airport	Bucaramanga	1,839,969	▲7.79%	▼1
8	Matecaña International Airport	Pereira	1,533,648	▲11.04%	Steady
9	Simón Bolívar International Airport	Santa Marta	1'457,078	▲19.17%	Steady
10	Camilo Daza International Airport	Cúcuta	1,163,415	▲17.01%	Steady
11	Enrique Olaya Herrera Airport	Medellín	1,087,787	▲8.98%	Steady
12	Los Garzones Airport	Montería	891,743	▲11.45%	Steady
13	El Eden Airport	Armenia	484,389	▲32.80%	▲1
14	El Alcaraván Airport	Yopal	448,700	▼6.08%	▼1
15	El Carano Airport	Quibdo	380,908	▲7.56%	▲2

== 2014 ==
=== Colombia's 15 busiest airports by passenger traffic ===
Rank	Airport	Location	Total passengers	Annual change	Rank change
1	El Dorado International Airport	Bogotá	27,430,266	▲9.68%	Steady
2	José María Córdova International Airport	Medellín	6,535,443	▼0.33%	Steady
3	Alfonso Bonilla Aragón International Airport	Cali	4,700,764	▲6.98%	Steady
4	Rafael Núñez International Airport	Cartagena	3,388,520	▲1.25%	Steady
5	Ernesto Cortissoz International Airport	Barranquilla	2,392,336	▲9.03%	Steady
6	Palonegro International Airport	Bucaramanga	1,706,953	▲11.58%	Steady
7	Gustavo Rojas Pinilla International Airport	San Andrés	1,500,526	▲8.21%	Steady
8	Matecaña International Airport	Pereira	1,381,135	▲16.46%	▲1
9	Simón Bolívar International Airport	Santa Marta	1'222,709	▼3.35%	▼1
10	Camilo Daza International Airport	Cúcuta	994,298	▼14.00%	▲1
11	Enrique Olaya Herrera Airport	Medellín	998,152	▲3.23%	▼1
12	Los Garzones Airport	Montería	800,140	▲11.45%	Steady
13	El Alcaraván Airport	Yopal	477,728	▲7.92%	Steady
14	El Eden Airport	Armenia	364,723	▲18.56%	▲2
15	Alfonso Lopez Airport	Valledupar	364,103	▲13.98%	▲2

== 2013 ==
=== Colombia's 15 busiest airports by passenger traffic ===
Rank	Airport	Location	Total passengers	Annual change	Rank change
1	El Dorado International Airport	Bogotá	25,009,483	▲11.03%	Steady
2	José María Córdova International Airport	Medellín	6,557,185	▲29.14%	Steady
3	Alfonso Bonilla Aragón International Airport	Cali	4,393,974	▲18.78%	Steady
4	Rafael Núñez International Airport	Cartagena	3,346,766	▲18.86%	Steady
5	Ernesto Cortissoz International Airport	Barranquilla	2,194,123	▲13.99%	Steady
6	Palonegro International Airport	Bucaramanga	1,529,761	▲11.39%	Steady
7	Gustavo Rojas Pinilla International Airport	San Andrés	1,386,646	▲8.57%	Steady
8	Simón Bolívar International Airport	Santa Marta	1'265,030	▲24.64%	Steady
9	Matecaña International Airport	Pereira	1,185,969	▲19.92%	Steady
10	Enrique Olaya Herrera Airport	Medellín	966,915	▲4.45%	Steady
11	Camilo Daza International Airport	Cúcuta	872,194	▼2.83%	Steady
12	Los Garzones Airport	Montería	717,961	▲26.63%	Steady
13	El Alcaraván Airport	Yopal	442,651	▲8.97%	Steady
14	El Carano Airport	Quibdo	356,060	▲17.40%	▲2
15	Benito Salas Airport	Neiva	327,506	▲6.10%	Steady

== 2012 ==
=== Colombia's 15 busiest airports by passenger traffic ===
Rank	Airport	Location	Total passengers	Annual change	Rank change
1	El Dorado International Airport	Bogotá	22,525,873	▲11.04%	Steady
2	José María Córdova International Airport	Medellín	5,077,540	▲36.68%	Steady
3	Alfonso Bonilla Aragón International Airport	Cali	3,699,236	▲14.18%	Steady
4	Rafael Núñez International Airport	Cartagena	2,815,734	▲31.50%	Steady
5	Ernesto Cortissoz International Airport	Barranquilla	1,924,814	▲17.35%	Steady
6	Palonegro International Airport	Bucaramanga	1,373,373	▲8.23%	Steady
7	Gustavo Rojas Pinilla International Airport	San Andrés	1,277,163	▲17.64%	Steady
8	Simón Bolívar International Airport	Santa Marta	1'014'985	▲17.12%	▲2
9	Matecaña International Airport	Pereira	988,959	▲14.34%	Steady
10	Enrique Olaya Herrera Airport	Medellín	925,737	▼1.78%	▼2
11	Camilo Daza International Airport	Cúcuta	897,556	▲13.52%	Steady
12	Los Garzones Airport	Montería	568,989	▼-0.25%	Steady
13	El Alcaraván Airport	Yopal	406,213	▲21.20%	Steady
14	El Eden International Airport	Armenia	324,184	▲5.63%	Steady
15	Benito Salas Airport	Neiva	308,665	▼6.43%	Steady

== 2011 ==
=== Colombia's 15 busiest airports by passenger traffic ===
Rank	Airport	Location	Total passengers	Annual change	Rank change
1	El Dorado International Airport	Bogotá	20,258,888	▲7.0%	Steady
2	José María Córdova International Airport	Medellín	3,712,121	▲4.8%	Steady
3	Alfonso Bonilla Aragón International Airport	Cali	3,237,835	▼2.2%	Steady
4	Rafael Núñez International Airport	Cartagena	2,140,907	▲1.0%	Steady
5	Ernesto Cortissoz International Airport	Barranquilla	1,637,256	▼4.8%	Steady
6	Palonegro International Airport	Bucaramanga	1,266,581	▼1.0%	Steady
7	Gustavo Rojas Pinilla International Airport	San Andrés	1,078,852	▲8.4%	▲1
8	Enrique Olaya Herrera Airport	Medellín	940,030	▼6.0%	▼1
9	Matecaña International Airport	Pereira	864,247	▲0.7%	Steady
10	Simón Bolívar International Airport	Santa Marta	866,260	▲2.6%	Steady
11	Camilo Daza International Airport	Cúcuta	789,869	▼0.1%	Steady
12	Los Garzones Airport	Montería	568,031	▼0.0%	Steady
13	El Alcaraván Airport	Yopal	330,499	▲33.4%	▲3
14	El Eden International Airport	Armenia	306,857	▲13.0%	▲1
15	Benito Salas Airport	Neiva	288,057	▼5.7%	▼2

== 2010 ==
=== Colombia's 15 busiest airports by passenger traffic ===
Rank	Airport	Location	Total passengers	Annual change	Rank change
1	El Dorado International Airport	Bogotá	18,934,203	▲27.1%	Steady
2	José María Córdova International Airport	Medellín	3,541,020	▲30.2%	Steady
3	Alfonso Bonilla Aragón International Airport	Cali	3,311,674	▲24.1%	Steady
4	Rafael Núñez International Airport	Cartagena	2,118,679	▲25.8%	Steady
5	Ernesto Cortissoz International Airport	Barranquilla	1,719,116	▲33.1%	Steady
6	Palonegro International Airport	Bucaramanga	1,279,499	▲45.25%	▲1
7	Enrique Olaya Herrera Airport	Medellín	1,000,248	▼1.1%	▼1
8	Gustavo Rojas Pinilla International Airport	San Andrés	995,661	▲9.3%	Steady
9	Matecaña International Airport	Pereira	857,818	▲32.7%	Steady
10	Simón Bolívar International Airport	Santa Marta	843,919	▲51.9%	Steady
11	Camilo Daza International Airport	Cúcuta	790,448	▲58.7%	Steady
12	Los Garzones Airport	Montería	568,206	▲38.2%	Steady
13	Benito Salas Airport	Neiva	305,380	▲10.2%	Steady
14	El Caraño Airport	Quibdó	273,479	▲21.7%	▲1
15	El Eden International Airport	Armenia	271,533	▲9.8%	▼1
