= Colombia Migration =

Colombia's border control agency

Colombia Migration Migración Colombia

Agency overview
- Formed: October 31, 2011
- Preceding agencies: Administrative Department of Security; Aeronautica Civil

Jurisdictional structure
- National agency: Colombia
- Operations jurisdiction: Colombia
- Governing body: Government of Colombia
- Constituting instrument: Decreto 4062/2011
- Specialist jurisdiction: National border patrol, security, integrity

Operational structure
- Overseen by: Ministry of Foreign Affairs
- Headquarters: Bogotá, Colombia

Website
- http://www.migracioncolombia.gov.co/

Colombia Migration (Spanish: Migración Colombia) is Colombia's border control agency responsible for monitoring and conducting migratory control within the framework of national sovereignty and in accordance with the law.

== History ==
After the dissolution of the Administrative Department of Security, which was also in charge of migratory services, the Colombian Government, under the Ministry of Foreign Affairs, created Migración Colombia in order to carry out border control and migration enforcement tasks. Customs formalities are carried out by the National Directorate of Taxes and Customs, a separate agency under the Ministry of Finance and Public Credit.

== Border posts ==
=== Airports ===
- El Edén International Airport in Armenia
- Ernesto Cortissoz International Airport in Barranquilla
- El Dorado International Airport in Bogotá
- Palonegro International Airport in Bucaramanga
- Alfonso Bonilla Aragón International Airport in Cali
- Rafael Núñez International Airport in Cartagena de Indias
- Camilo Daza International Airport in Cúcuta
- Alfredo Vásquez Cobo International Airport in Leticia
- José María Córdova International Airport in Medellín
- Matecaña International Airport in Pereira
- Almirante Padilla Airport in Riohacha
- Gustavo Rojas Pinilla International Airport in San Andrés
- Simón Bolívar International Airport in Santa Marta
- Alfonso López Pumarejo Airport in Valledupar
- Apiay Air Force Base in Villavicencio

=== Fluvial ===
- Leticia in Amazonas
- Inírida in Guainía
- Puerto Leguízamo in Putumayo
- Puerto Carreño in Vichada

=== Maritime ===
- Turbo in Antioquia
- Barranquilla in Atlantico
- Cartagena in Bolívar
- Bahía Solano in Chocó
- Capurganá in Chocó
- Puerto Nuevo in La Guajira
- Puerto Simón Bolívar in La Guajira
- Santa Marta in Magdalena
- Tumaco in Nariño
- Providencia in the Archipelago of San Andrés
- San Andrés in the Archipelago of San Andrés
- Coveñas in Sucre
- Buenaventura in Valle del Cauca

== See also ==
- National Directorate of Taxes and Customs
