= Ultra Air =

Colombian low-cost airline

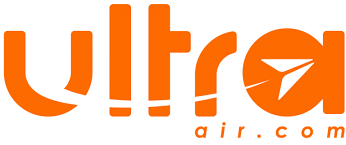

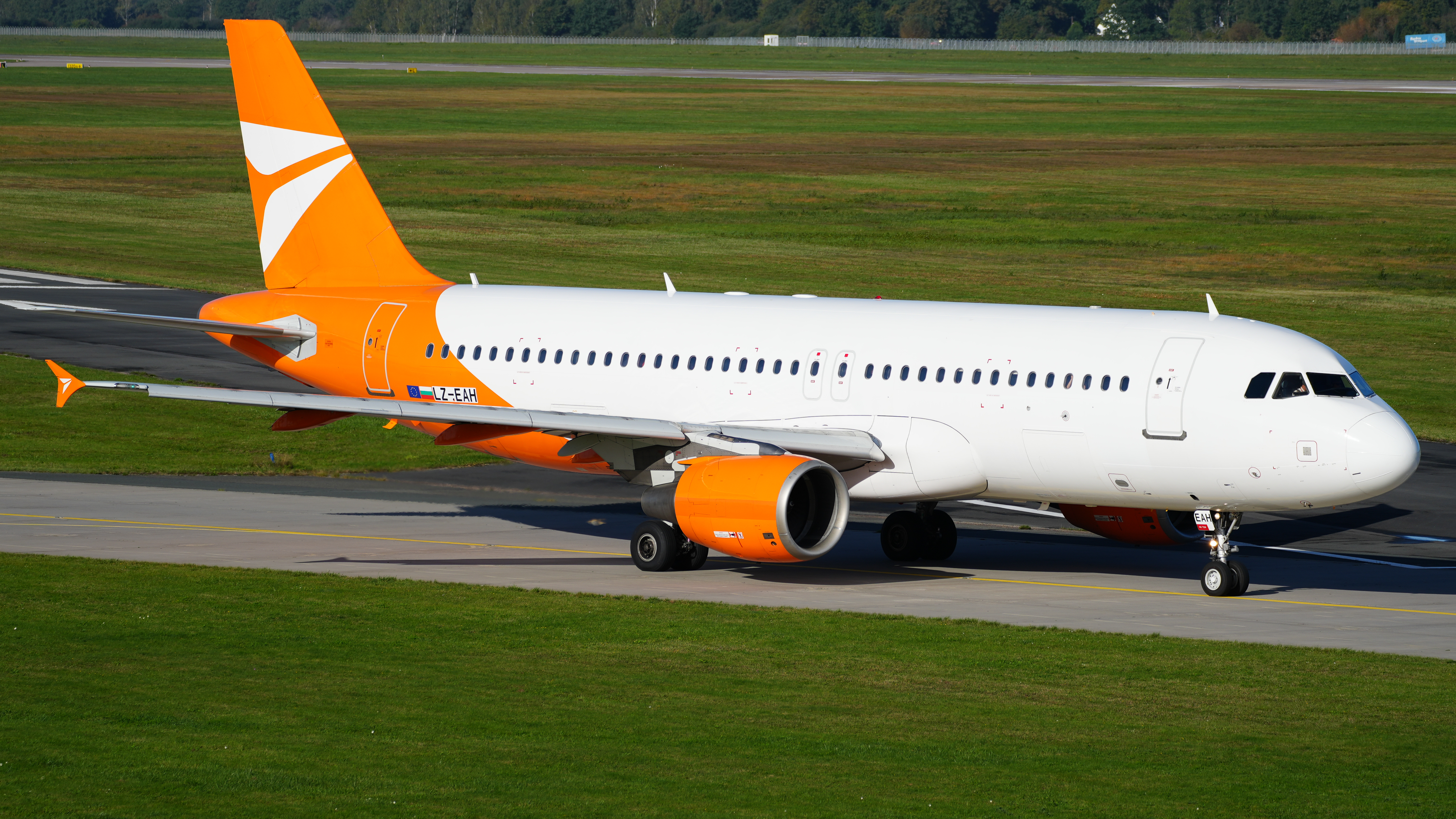
IATA	ICAO	Call sign
U0	ULS	AIR ULTRA
- Founded: 2020
- Commenced operations: 23 February 2022
- Ceased operations: 30 March 2023
- Hubs: José María Córdova International Airport
- Focus cities: El Dorado International Airport
- Fleet size: 6
- Destinations: 10
- Headquarters: Rionegro, Colombia
- Key people: William N.A. Shaw (Founder & CEO)
- Website: www.ultraair.com

Ultra Air S.A.S was a Colombian low-cost airline headquartered in Rionegro, Antioquia, with its main base located at José María Córdova International Airport, serving Medellín.

== History ==
Ultra Air was founded in 2020 by founder and former CEO of Viva Air Colombia & Viva Air Perú and former Interjet CEO William Shaw. It received its air operator's certificate from the Colombian Civil Aviation Authority in January 2022, and began passenger operations on 23 February 2022 with an inaugural flight from Bogotá to San Andrés Island.

In January 2022, Ultra Air became the first airline to receive a mega-investment qualification from the Ministry of Commerce, Industry and Tourism, which grants tax incentives to companies that meet certain criteria such as creating a certain amount of new jobs (Ultra Air having created 22,000), and investing a certain amount (Ultra Air having planned to invest US$30 million throughout the subsequent five years).

On 29 March 2023, Ultra Air announced that it would suspend operations effective 30 March at 12:00 a.m. local time.

== Destinations ==
As of March 2023, Ultra Air flew to the following destinations:

Country	City	Airport	Notes	Refs
Colombia	Barranquilla	Ernesto Cortissoz International Airport		
Colombia	Bogotá	El Dorado International Airport	Focus city	
Colombia	Cali	Alfonso Bonilla Aragón International Airport		
Colombia	Cúcuta	Camilo Daza International Airport		
Colombia	Cartagena	Rafael Núñez International Airport		
Colombia	Medellín	José María Córdova International Airport	Hub	
Colombia	Montería	Los Garzones Airport		
Colombia	Pereira	Matecaña International Airport		
Colombia	San Andrés	Gustavo Rojas Pinilla International Airport		
Colombia	Santa Marta	Simón Bolívar International Airport		

== Fleet ==
As of March 2023, Ultra Air operated an all-Airbus A320 fleet.

Aircraft	In service	Orders	Passengers	Notes
Airbus A320-200	6	—	180	
Total	6	—		

== See also ==
- List of airlines of Colombia
- List of defunct airlines of Colombia
- List of low-cost carriers
