= Viva Air Colombia =

Colombian low-cost airline

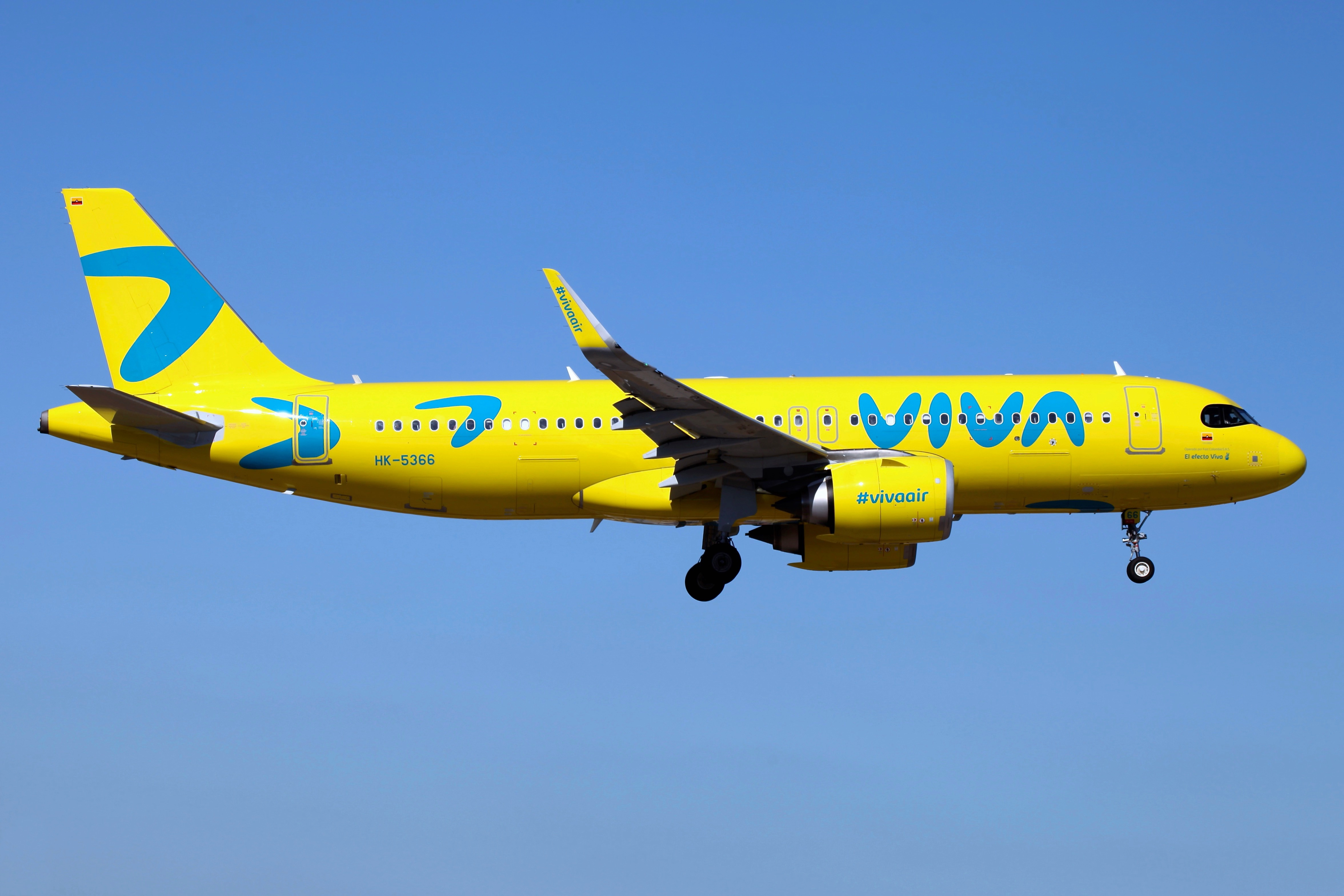
IATA	ICAO	Call sign
VH	VVC	VIVA COLOMBIA
- Founded: September 16, 2009
- Commenced operations: May 25, 2012
- Ceased operations: February 27, 2023
- AOC #: 9B2F646F
- Hubs: Alfonso Bonilla Aragón International Airport; El Dorado International Airport; José María Córdova International Airport
- Focus cities: Rafael Núñez International Airport
- Subsidiaries: Viva Air Perú
- Fleet size: 41
- Destinations: 25
- Parent company: Irelandia Aviation
- Headquarters: Rionegro, Colombia
- Key people: Francisco Lalinde (President and CEO)
- Founders: William N.A. Shaw, Juan E. Posada, Gabriel Migowski, Frederik Jacobsen
- Employees: 1,500
- Website: www.vivaair.com

Fast Colombia S.A.S., trading as Viva Air Colombia and formerly VivaColombia, was a Colombian ultra low-cost airline based in Rionegro, Antioquia, Colombia. It was a subsidiary of Irelandia Aviation and, as of its bankruptcy in March 2023, the third largest airline in the country. The company was not legally affiliated with Mexico's Viva Aerobus, another low-cost carrier co-founded by Irelandia which also uses the "Viva" brand, although they did have a codeshare agreement for their flights. The company filed for insolvency in February 2023, and on February 27, 2023, the airline suspended, and eventually ceased, all operations, citing rising fuel prices and Aerocivil's failure to approve its planned acquisition by Avianca.

== Foundation and early years ==
The airline was part of the Irelandia Aviation group, a low-cost airline developer led by Declan Ryan (chairman of the Viva Air group and one of the founders of Ryanair). Irelandia personnel have been involved in the development of five low-cost airlines around the world: Ryanair, Tiger Airways, Allegiant Air, VivaAerobus, and Viva Air. Irelandia owned 100% of its shares.

On May 9, 2017, Viva Air Perú, a Peruvian subsidiary airline, was launched with which the expansion process throughout Latin America continues.

In April 2018, the company changed its name from VivaColombia to Viva Air Colombia to expand its model in Latin America and within the expansion plan Santa Marta was announced as the third center of operations in Colombia. The operations center was enabled in October 2018, with routes that were not covered by other airlines such as Santa Marta, San Andrés, Bucaramanga, and Pereira. This operations center would be assigned two aircraft initially.

== Merger ambitions ==
On April 29, 2022, it was announced that Avianca intended to acquire Viva Air Colombia. However, the Colombian Aerocivil had initially opposed the merger, citing concerns of competition reduction in the country. Despite this, negotiations for Avianca's merger have continued, and a new proposal is currently underway.

In February 2023, JetSmart and LATAM Colombia individually announced their intentions to acquire Viva Air as an alternative to Avianca. In the same month, the airline filed for bankruptcy protection following impacts of the COVID-19 pandemic and merger with Avianca. The company was forced to ground five aircraft from active service after the aircraft lessor claimed that Viva did not pay fees.

On February 23, 2023, Felix Antelo announced that he was stepping down from his role as President and CEO of the Viva Air Group, citing his health which had "declined recently". He urged Aerocivil to "make a decision right now" regarding the Avianca-Viva merger, as the company was now in grave danger of disappearing entirely. The company appointed Francisco Lalinde, previously their Vice President of Operations, as interim President and CEO of Viva Air.

On February 27, 2023, Viva Air and its subsidiary Viva Air Perú suspended their operations indefinitely and grounded their entire fleet due to the financial crisis, blaming the situation on the delay in the response from Aerocivil on the Avianca-Viva merger authorization, stating that "The (civil aviation authority's) unprecedented decision will result in further delays in reaching a decision, for which Viva is forced to announce the suspension of its operations with immediate effect."

On March 21, 2023, Aerocivil announced that it would approve the Avianca-Viva merger conditionally if the new entity complied with the following: to either refund or honor passengers' canceled bookings made prior to Viva Air's suspension of operations; to return some in-demand slots at Bogotá's El Dorado Airport previously held by Viva Air; to maintain Viva Air's low-cost model for consumers within Colombia; to reinstate flights between Bogotá and Buenos Aires; to maintain a fare cap on routes where the entity is the only operator; and, as the new entity would hold a majority of the market share in Colombia, to ensure that the market remains dynamic.

On May 13, 2023, after analyzing the "financial and technical implications" of the merger under these conditions, Avianca withdrew its plans for the acquisition of Viva Air, given the strict requirements of Aerocivil and the damage that these would have on the airline's economy.

== Bankruptcy ==
The company filed for insolvency in February 2023, and on February 27, 2023, the airline suspended, and eventually ceased, all operations, citing rising fuel prices and Aerocivil's failure to approve its planned acquisition by Avianca.

On June 22, 2023, the Superintendency of Corporations announced that Viva Air began its liquidation process due to the difficulties its having to resume operations.

== Destinations ==
Countries in which Viva Air operated (December 2022)

Viva Air Colombia served the following destinations (as of February 2023):

Country	City	Airport	Notes	Refs
Argentina	Buenos Aires	Ministro Pistarini International Airport		
Brazil	São Paulo	São Paulo/Guarulhos International Airport	Terminated	
Colombia	Apartadó	Antonio Roldan Betancourt Airport	Terminated	
Colombia	Armenia	El Edén International Airport		
Colombia	Barranquilla	Ernesto Cortissoz International Airport		
Colombia	Bogotá	El Dorado International Airport	Hub	
Colombia	Bucaramanga	Palonegro International Airport		
Colombia	Cali	Alfonso Bonilla Aragón International Airport	Hub	
Colombia	Cartagena	Rafael Núñez International Airport	Focus city	
Colombia	Cúcuta	Camilo Daza International Airport		
Colombia	Leticia	Alfredo Vásquez Cobo International Airport		
Colombia	Medellín	José María Córdova International Airport	Hub	
Colombia	Montería	Los Garzones Airport		
Colombia	Neiva	Benito Salas Airport		
Colombia	Pasto	Antonio Nariño Airport		
Colombia	Pereira	Matecaña International Airport		
Colombia	Riohacha	Almirante Padilla Airport		
Colombia	San Andrés	Gustavo Rojas Pinilla International Airport		
Colombia	Santa Marta	Simón Bolívar International Airport		
Colombia	Valledupar	Alfonso López Pumarejo Airport		
Colombia	Villavicencio	La Vanguardia Airport		
Dominican Republic	Punta Cana	Punta Cana International Airport		
Ecuador	Quito	Mariscal Sucre International Airport	Terminated	
Mexico	Cancún	Cancún International Airport		
Mexico	Mexico City	Mexico City International Airport		
Panama	Panama City	Panamá Pacífico International Airport	Terminated	
Peru	Lima	Jorge Chávez International Airport		
United States	Miami	Miami International Airport		
United States	Orlando	Orlando International Airport		

=== Interline agreements ===
Viva Air Colombia maintained interline agreements with the following airlines:

- Air Transat
- VivaAerobús

== Fleet ==
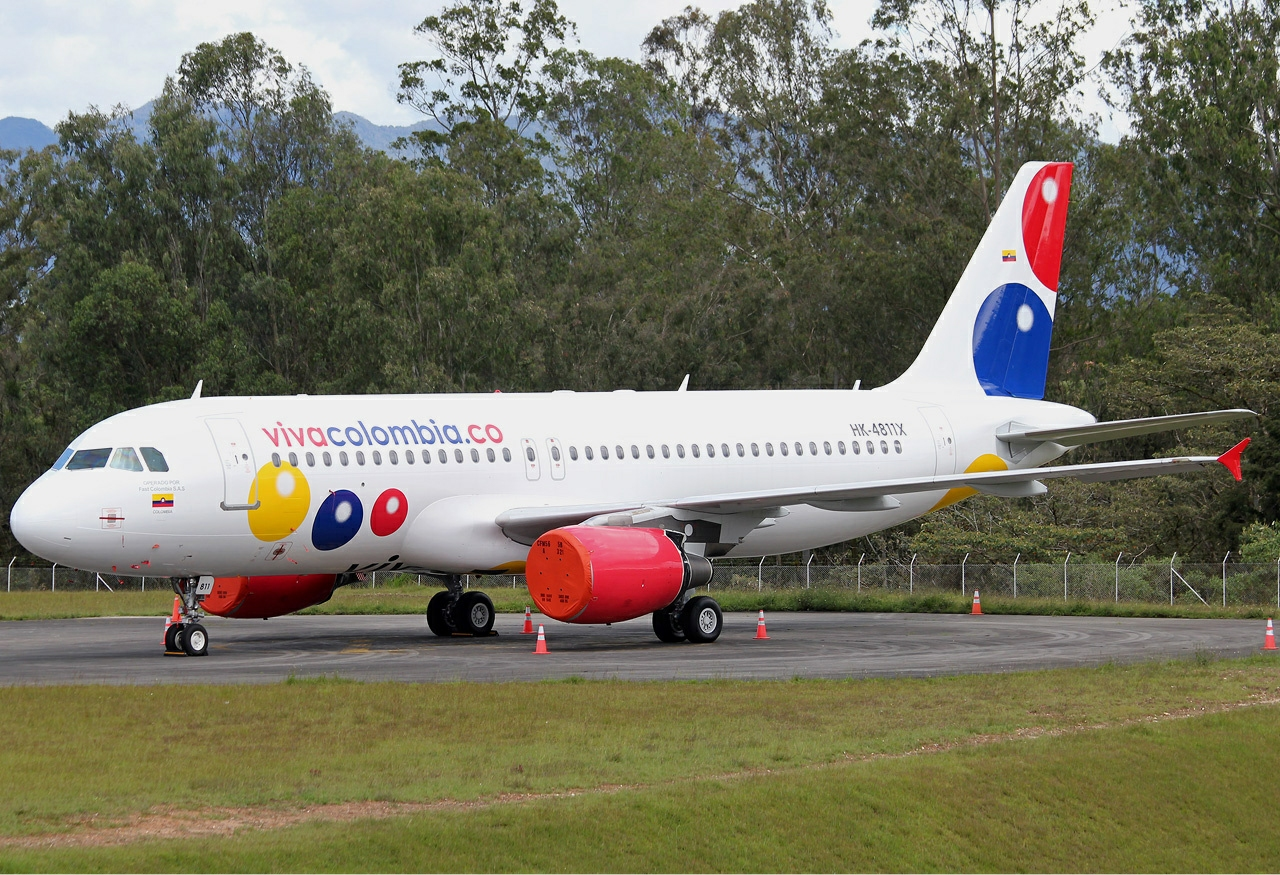
A former Viva Air Colombia Airbus A320-200 in its former livery and name.

The Viva Air Colombia fleet consisted of the following aircraft:

Viva Air Colombia former fleet
Aircraft	Total	Introduced	Retired	Notes
Airbus A320-200	29	2012	2023	
Airbus A320neo	12	2020	2023	All taken over by Avianca.

== Accidents and incidents ==
- On February 4, 2015, an Airbus A320-200 (registered HK-5051) flying from Bogotá to Medellín with 182 people aboard. 17 minutes after take off, an engine caught fire and the plane had to make an emergency landing at El Dorado International Airport. Once on the ground, firefighters brought the fire under control. Aerocivil reported that the passengers "had not been subject to a serious situation."

== See also ==
- List of airlines of Colombia
- List of defunct airlines of Colombia
- List of low-cost airlines
- Viva Air Perú
