= Aerotal =

Colombian airline, 1975–1983

AeroTal
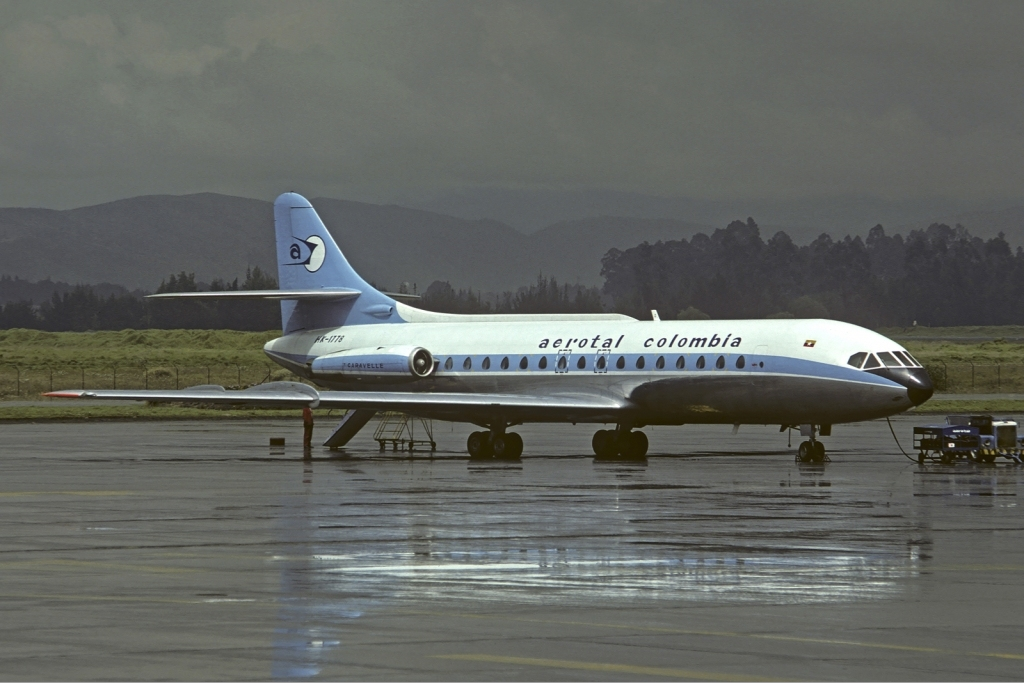
- 'The second airline of Colombia'; The first in the heart of Colombians
IATA	ICAO	Call sign
XK	ART	AEROTAL
- Founded: 1970
- Commenced operations: 1975
- Ceased operations: November 1983
- Hubs: La Vanguardia Airport
- Secondary hubs: El Dorado International Airport
- Fleet size: 9
- Destinations: 44
- Headquarters: Villavicencio, Colombia

AeroTal (Colombian Territorial Airlines, formerly as the Airlines El Llanero) was a Colombian airline based in the La Vanguardia Airport of Villavicencio. The airline specialized in both regional, domestic and international flights. It was founded in 1970 and completed its entire operations by 1983.

== History ==
On the initiative of Victor Manuel Ferrucho, AeroTal was created and was based in Villavicencio. The objective was to make non-scheduled flights to Meta. He started with one Cessna 206 and one Piper PA-21. Then, with the closure of the Avianca base in the town of Villavicencio, it was decided by the AeroTal board to expand their route chart and retake destinations abandoned by the rival company Avianca.

In 1974, a bunch of Douglas DC-3 airplanes were also purchased to operate to new destinations. Those Douglas DC-3s were bought from Avianca and a new base of operations was made in Bogotá. A year later, LAN Airlines Sud Aviation Caravelle aircraft were acquired by AeroTal to operate the busiest routes of the company in Arauca and Leticia. When there was specific transport of cargo, international charter flights were made, which in turn made the possibility of replacing the DC-4 with larger planes to cover for the mass international routes it had at that current time. At that time, the AeroTal board had no interest whatsoever in generating flights to the Eastern Plains. However they planned to make flights to the Eastern Plains when they started off in 1970 to make flights there.

That very same year the main trunk routes began to operate, such as Cali, San Andrés, among other routes. It was also decided by the AeroTal company board to suspend operations in Leticia to use the new jets on trunk air routes. Three years later, a fourth Sud Aviation Caravelle was incorporated to AeroTal's fleet to accommodate for the enormous demand for the trunk air routes. That was when AeroTal changed its name to "Colombian Territorial Airlines". Then in 1979 the Civil Aeronautics Board (CAB) authorized cargo flights to Miami, for which a Boeing 707 was acquired through Leasing.

At the beginning of the early eighties, the company started getting routes to Pereira and Medellín. They were improving their markets greatly during that time and their position in the domestic market. When Aerocondor Colombia ceased operations, the airline saw the possibility of expanding. The company then ordered 720 and 727 aircraft, which operated on the companies most important routes. In 1981, promotions never before seen in Colombia were launched, with which tariff schemes were broken. These gave the idea of starting to operate passenger flights to Miami, temporarily from Barranquilla, Bogotá, Medellín and San Andrés.

== Crisis and bankruptcy ==
AeroTal's first major problems began with a series of hijackings involving several of their Boeing 727s. These 727 aircraft were a subject of a warning statement issued by Boeing, which mentioned problems with the ailerons and the rudder as well as leaks in the hydraulic and fuel system. Then in 1983, there was a financial crisis in some banks and that caused AeroTal to suspend a lot of its operations to cease. During that time the company had to receive significant financial aid. Also during that period there was a restructuring of AeroTal executives, and Avianca was requested to cover the airline's routes temporarily.

After the brief period the company was out of service from operating it. The company was unable to order or get any spare parts for its aircraft. In addition to not having any spare parts, the company was out of workers since they couldn't pay them. So most of the workers went another other line of work or went to work at Avianca. Due to these problems, it was decided by the AeroTal company board to hire the former employees of Aerocóndor. But the problem was not the lack of staff, but the lack of budget.

Finally, due to serious debts, AeroTal operations were permanently suspended because of everything that happened in those early eighties.

After the bankruptcy of AeroTal, irregularities were discovered in the operation of the company, as well as invalid procedures to take the aircraft to other countries. So the company if it was in service it would´ve been severely fined and probably taken out service either way.

== Revival of the company ==
In the year 1984, the president of the company, Hugo Salguero, presented a plan to the AeroTal company board to save the company. It included renting a Boeing 727 to the company Avianca. Another Boeing 727 was also loaned to ACES. It was also planned to operate the Caravelle taken from the fleet years ago. However, this project did not work.

Again in 1988 a new plan was created to recover the liquidated company. The way to cover the old debts and supply the public needs was sought, since at that time Avianca had suspended its cargo flights to United States. Unfortunately, this new plan also failed. So by the end of the eighties all efforts to revive the company ended and the company was put to rest.

== Destinations ==
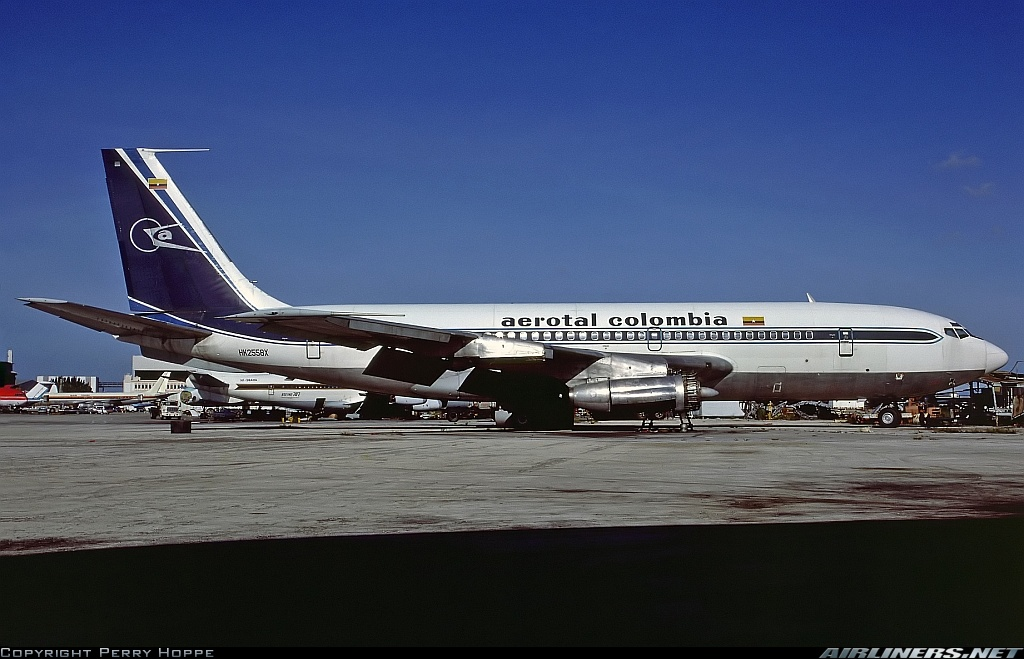
An Aerotal Boeing 720B in 1984

Colombia

- Aguaclara
- Arauca / Santiago Pérez Quiroz Airport
- Barranquilla / Ernesto Cortissoz International Airport
- Bocas del Pauto
- Bogotá / El Dorado International Airport
- Bucaramanga / Palonegro International Airport
- Cali / Alfonso Bonilla Aragón International Airport
- Cartagena / Rafael Núñez International Airport
- Cúcuta / Camilo Daza International Airport
- El Totumo
- Florencia / Gustavo Artunduaga Paredes Airport
- La Hermosa
- La Macarena / La Macarena Airport
- La Primavera
- Laureles
- Leticia / Alfredo Vásquez Cobo International Airport
- Medellín / Olaya Herrera Airport
- Monterrey
- Orocué
- Pasto / Antonio Nariño Airport
- Paz de Ariporo
- Pereira / Matecaña International Airport
- Puerto Carreño
- Puerto Inírida
- Puerto Leguízamo
- Rondón
- San Andrés Island / Gustavo Rojas Pinilla International Airport
- San José del Guaviare
- San Luis de Palenque
- San Pedro de Jagua
- San Vicente del Caguán
- Santa Marta / Simón Bolívar International Airport (Colombia)
- Santa Rosalía
- Saravena / Los Colonizadores Airport
- Tame / Gabriel Vargas Santos Airport
- Trinidad
- Villanueva
- Villavicencio / La Vanguardia Airport
- Yopal / El Alcaraván Airport

Aruba

- Oranjestad / Queen Beatrix International Airport

Panama

- Panamá / Tocumen International Airport

United States

- Miami / Miami International Airport

Venezuela

- Caracas / Simón Bolívar International Airport (Venezuela)

== Fleet ==
- Boeing 707-320C
- Boeing 707-320F
- Boeing 720B
- Boeing 727-100
- Cessna 206 Stationair
- Douglas DC-3A
- Douglas DC-4
- Piper 21 Apache
- Piper PA-32 Cherokee
- Sud Aviation Caravelle

== See also ==
- List of defunct airlines of Colombia
- La Vanguardia Airport
- List of airlines of Colombia
