= Clic Air =

Low-cost airline of Colombia

IATA	ICAO	Call sign
VE	EFY	EASYFLY
- Founded: 2006; 20 years ago
- Commenced operations: October 10, 2007; 18 years ago (as EasyFly); August 15, 2023; 3 years ago (as Clic Air)
- Operating bases: Bogotá; Bucaramanga; Cali; Medellín–Olaya Herrera; Montería
- Fleet size: 19
- Destinations: 37
- Headquarters: Bogotá, Colombia
- Key people: Ávila Velandia (President)
- Founder: Alfonso Ávila
- Website: www.clicair.co

Clic Air (formerly known as EasyFly and officially Empresa Aérea de Servicios y Facilitación Logística Integral S.A.) is a regional airline that operates in Colombia. Its main focus is to serve intermediate cities and those not served by other carriers. Operations started in October 2007, with one British Aerospace Jetstream 41 aircraft. Its main base is El Dorado International Airport, Bogotá. Alfonso Ávila, the founder of EasyFly, was also one of the founders of Aero República in 1992.

== History ==
The airline was founded as EasyFly in 2006 by Alfonso Ávila and other partners. Its first aircraft have been acquired through the leasing system. After having 9 approved routes, operations began on October 10, 2007, with only two routes: Barrancabermeja and Arauca from Bogotá. Between November 2007 and January 2008, new routes were inaugurated to the cities of Armenia, Cartago, Yopal, Ibague and Villavicencio.

During 2010, 7 aircraft entered the fleet and in 2012, a new base was inaugurated at Ernesto Cortissoz International Airport.

In 2018, EasyGroup, licensor of the EasyJet brand, began legal proceedings against EasyFly and Honduras-based EasySky over use of the "easy" prefix. In April 2019, EasyGroup statement focused on this case indicated a claim against Colombia's EasyFly was ongoing.

In 2019, the British Aerospace Jetstream 41 left the fleet and gave way to a fleet entirely composed of ATRs.

On July 8, 2023, EasyFly announced that it will be renamed as Clic Air, after the legal process filed by EasyGroup. The airline officially rebranded on August 15, 2023.

== Destinations ==
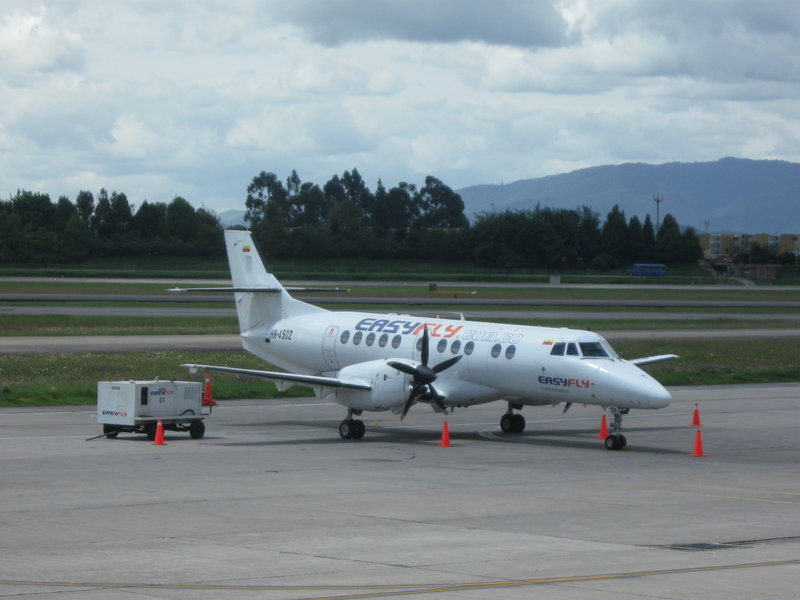
A former EasyFly BAe Jetstream 41 parked at El Dorado International Airport in 2009

As of July 2023, Clic Air operates to the following cities:

City	Airport	Notes	Refs
Apartadó	Antonio Roldán Betancourt Airport		
Arauca	Santiago Pérez Quiroz Airport		
Armenia	El Edén International Airport		
Bahía Solano	José Celestino Mutis Airport		
Barrancabermeja	Yariguíes Airport		
Barranquilla	Ernesto Cortissoz International Airport		
Bogotá	El Dorado International Airport	Base	
Bucaramanga	Palonegro International Airport	Base	
Buenaventura	Gerardo Tobar López Airport		
Cali	Alfonso Bonilla Aragón International Airport	Base	
Cartagena	Rafael Núñez International Airport		
Cartago	Santa Ana Airport	Terminated	
Corozal	Las Brujas Airport		
Cúcuta	Camilo Daza International Airport		
Florencia	Gustavo Artunduaga Paredes Airport		
Ibagué	Perales Airport		
Inírida	César Gaviria Trujillo Airport		
La Macarena	La Macarena Airport		
Manizales	La Nubia Airport		
Medellín	Olaya Herrera Airport	Base	
Medellín	José María Córdova International Airport		
Montería	Los Garzones Airport	Base	
Neiva	Benito Salas Airport		
Paipa	Juan José Rondón Airport		
Pasto	Antonio Nariño Airport		
Pereira	Matecaña International Airport		
Pitalito	Contador Airport		
Popayán	Guillermo León Valencia Airport		
Puerto Asís	Tres de Mayo Airport		
Puerto Gaitán	Puerto Gaitán Airport		
Quibdó	El Caraño Airport		
Riohacha	Almirante Padilla Airport	Terminated	
San José del Guaviare	Jorge Enrique González Torres Airport		
Saravena	Los Colonizadores Airport		
Tolú	Golfo de Morrosquillo Airport		
Tumaco	La Florida Airport		
Valledupar	Alfonso López Pumarejo Airport		
Villavicencio	La Vanguardia Airport		
Yopal	El Alcaraván Airport		

=== Codeshare agreements ===
- Avianca

=== Interline agreements ===
- APG Airlines

== Fleet ==
=== Current ===
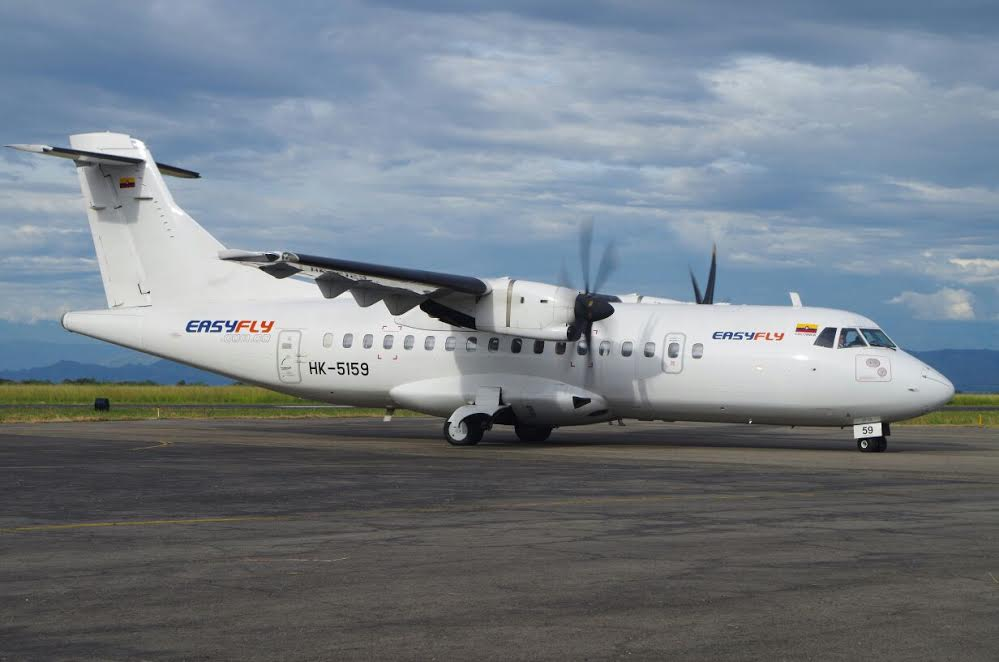
An EasyFly ATR 42-500

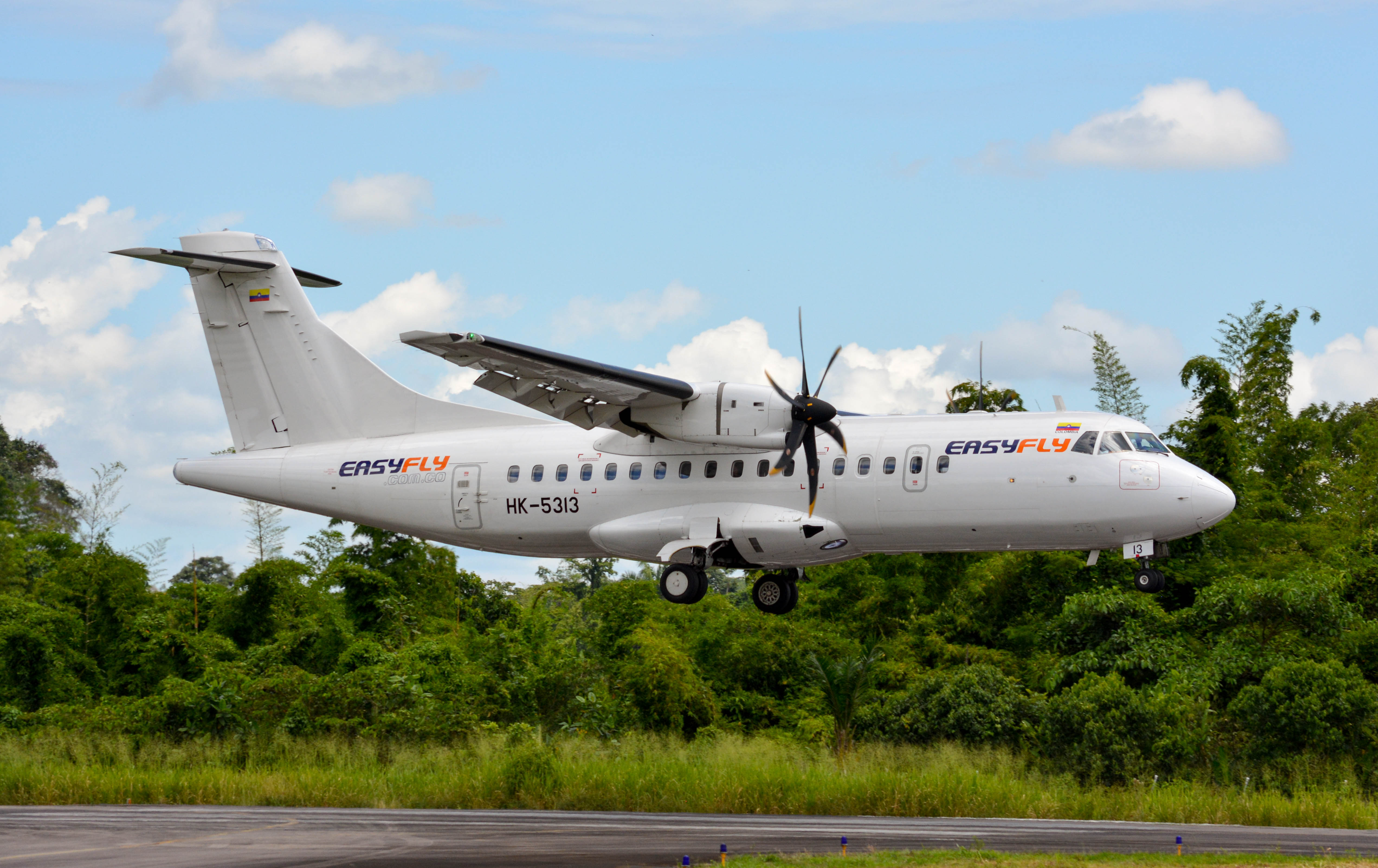
An Easyfly ATR 42-600

As of August 2025, Clic operates the following aircraft:

Clic Air fleet
Aircraft	In service	Orders	Passengers	Notes
ATR 42-500	1	—	48	
ATR 42-600	12	—	48	
ATR 72-600	6	—	70	
Total	19	—		

== Accidents and incidents ==
- On March 26, 2012, EasyFly Flight 8697, a British Aerospace Jetstream 41, presented a hydraulic fluid spill during a flight. The aircraft landed without complications in José María Córdoba International Airport.
- On October 15, 2020, EasyFly Flight 9069, an ATR 42-600 (registered HK-5310) collided with a jet bridge at Palonegro International Airport. It is speculated that it was a brake failure, however the aircraft was approaching in a prohibited trajectory for this type of turboprop aircraft. According to Caracol Radio, "an irregular procedure by the pilot" caused the incident, there were no injuries.

== See also ==
- List of airlines of Colombia
