= VUP =

VUP may refer to:

- Alfonso López Pumarejo Airport, also known as Valledupar Airport, IATA code VUP
- Instructions per second, as "VAX Unit of Performance"
- The viewer/user/player role in transmedia storytelling, a communication technique
