= SBIA =

Sbia or SBIA may refer to:

- An ancient city in Tunisia that some have identified as Mahdia
- San Bernardino International Airport
- Simón Bolívar International Airport (Colombia)
- Simón Bolívar International Airport (Venezuela)
- South Bend, Indiana, a city in Indiana and the United States
- Subic Bay International Airport
- Suvarnabhumi Airport, also known as (New) Bangkok International Airport, BKK
