= Juan José Rondón Airport =

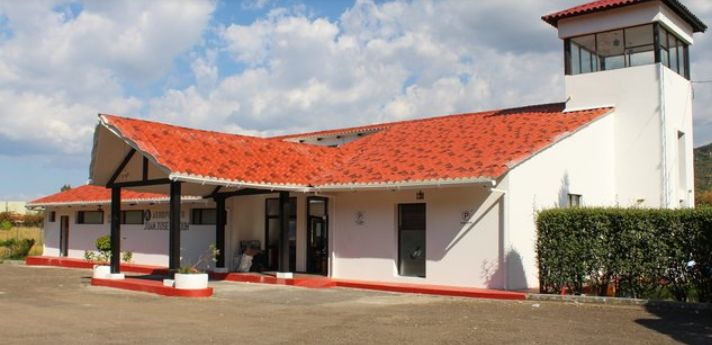
- IATA: RON; ICAO: SKPA

Summary
- Airport type: Public
- Serves: Paipa, Colombia
- Elevation AMSL: 8,205 ft (2,501 m)
- Coordinates: 5°45′52″N 73°06′20″W

Map
- Location of the airport in Colombia

Runways
Direction	Length		Surface
Direction	m	ft	Surface
04/22	1,600	5,249	Asphalt
- Source: GCM Google Maps

Juan José Rondón Airport (IATA: RON, ICAO: SKPA) is a high-elevation airport serving the town of Paipa in the Boyacá Department of Colombia.

The airport is 4.6 kilometres (2.9 mi) east of the TermoPaipa power plant and 2 kilometres (1.2 mi) south of the town, just east of Lake Sochagota. The runway length does not include a 100 metres (330 ft) displaced threshold on Runway 04.

== Airlines and destinations ==
Airlines	Destinations
Clic	Medellín–Olaya Herrera
SATENA	Bogotá, Medellín–Olaya Herrera, Yopal

== Accidents and incidents ==
- On January 10, 2026, a private Piper PA-31 Navajo crashed while attempting to take off at the airport, killing six people on board. Among those killed was popular singer Yeison Jiménez.

== See also ==
- Transport in Colombia
- List of airports in Colombia
