= El Alcaraván Airport =

El Alcaraván Airport Aeropuerto El Alcaraván
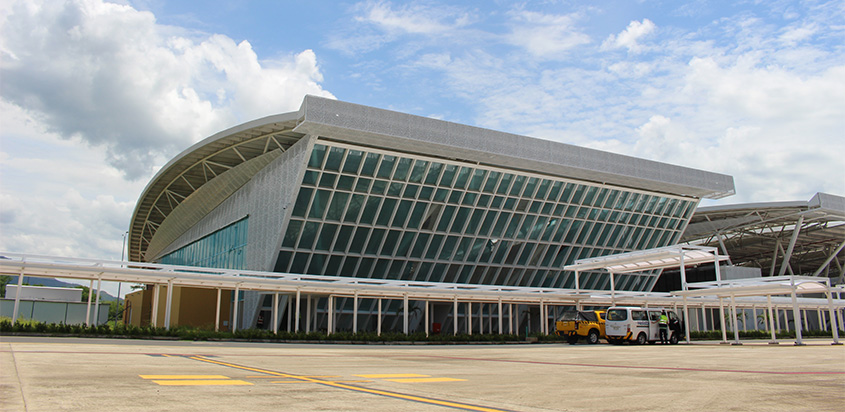
- IATA: EYP; ICAO: SKYP

Summary
- Airport type: Public
- Operator: Aerocivil
- Location: Yopal, Colombia
- Elevation AMSL: 1,027 ft (313 m)
- Coordinates: 5°19′10″N 72°23′02″W

Map
- Airport in Colombia

Runways
Direction	Length		Surface
Direction	m	ft	Surface
05/23	2,250	7,382	Asphalt
- Sources: GCM

El Alcaraván Airport (Spanish: Aeropuerto El Alcaraván, IATA: EYP, ICAO: SKYP), also known as El Yopal Airport, is an airport serving the city of Yopal, the capital of the Casanare Department of Colombia. The airport is on the southeast edge of the city.

Although the airport only has domestic flights to Bogotá and Bucaramanga, it is classified as an international airport because it has an immigration facility.

Passenger airlines currently serving the airport are LATAM Airlines Colombia, Avianca and EasyFly. Due to the economy of the department of Casanare, based on petroleum, there has been an increase in the number of passenger movements.

== History ==
In 1965, the first commercial flights began in Yopal when Aerotaxi Casanare S.A. was founded. It was the only airline until 1992 when the Aeronautica Civil allowed Aires S.A. to operate from this airport.

In 1996, Ecopetrol, BP, and other companies were interested in the petroleum that the department has and decided to invest 6100 million pesos for improving the runway and offices with the goal of adapting the airport to allow the Antonov 124 a safe landing.

On 27 November 1996, Ernesto Samper, a former president of Colombia, arrived in a Boeing 707 at El Alcaraván airport to inaugurate the improvements that were made by the oil companies.

In September 2006, the Camara de Comercio de Casanare (Casanare Chamber of Commerce) asked the Ministry of Transport to make El Alcaraván an international airport, because it has all the facilities that are needed, it would increase the economy of the department, and it would let the flights that come from North America and South America refuel.

In July 2018, renovations were completed at the airport and the new terminal was opened, at a cost of around $100 million USD.

== Airlines and destinations ==
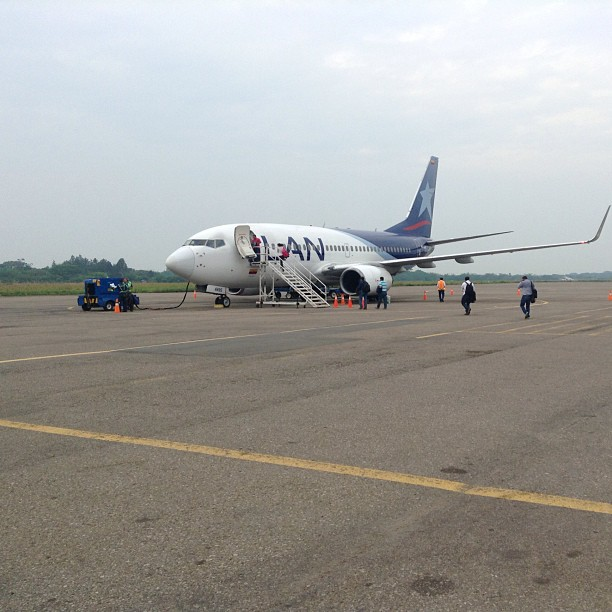
Boeing 737-700 of Lan Colombia (now LATAM Colombia) at El Alcaraván Airport

Airlines serving the airport include:

Airlines	Destinations
Avianca	Bogotá
Clic	Bogotá
LATAM Colombia	Bogotá
SATENA	Paipa

== Antonov 124 ==
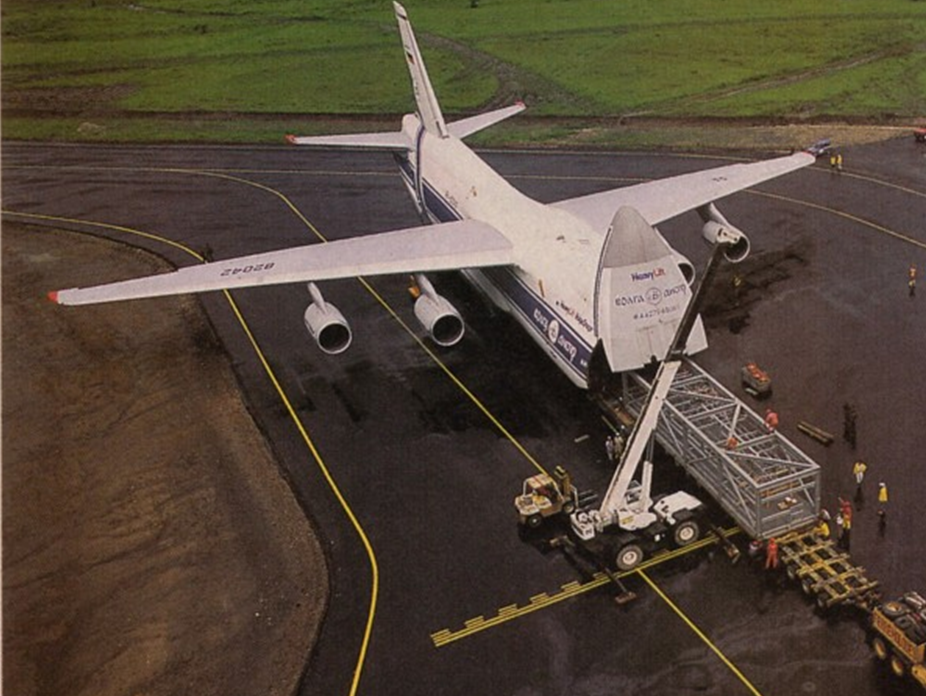
Antonov 124 in Yopal, Casanare

In August 1997, the specialized magazine Motor from Bogotá, published an article about the flights that the Antonov 124, one of the largest airplanes in the world with a capacity of 120 tons, had flown from Ernesto Cortissoz International Airport in Barranquilla to Yopal in order to deliver machines and material that BP needed for building oil wells in Casanare. Each trip had a price of 85 million pesos. Owing to the characteristics of this airplane, the runway had to be extended.

== Transport ==
Access to the airport can be made by taxi or bus. There are 50 parking spaces at the entrance of the airport for passengers to unload luggage. They are not allowed to wait in front of the terminal for security reasons.

== Accidents and incidents ==
- On 25 October 1976, a Douglas C-47 HK-149 of Taxi Aéreo El Venado crashed on approach. The aircraft was on a domestic scheduled passenger flight. Shortly after take-off, the port engine failed and the decision was made to return to El Alcaraván. All 36 people on board were killed.
- On 31 January 2001, a Caravelle 10R operated by Líneas Aéreas Suramericanas crashed on approach to the airport. The cargo flight's original destination was Mitu, but while landing at Mitu the landing gear struck the ground before the threshold. The crew had plans to divert to Bogota, but they could not fully raise the flaps, and decided to return to El Alcaravan. On the approach to Yopal, the left engine was failing and the crew decided to shut it off. Then the crew decided to burn fuel with the left wing tank to avoid a fire during landing. Once the low fuel warning appeared, the pilot switched to the right tank. However, the right engine began to fail on approach, and eventually crashed 4 miles from the runway. Three out of six died.

== See also ==
- Transport in Colombia
- List of airports in Colombia
