= Almirante Padilla Airport =

Almirante Padilla Airport Aeropuerto Almirante Padilla
- IATA: RCH; ICAO: SKRH

Summary
- Airport type: Public
- Operator: Aerocivil
- Serves: Riohacha, Colombia
- Elevation AMSL: 43 ft / 13 m
- Coordinates: 11°31′35″N 72°55′35″W

Map

Runways
Direction	Length		Surface
Direction	m	ft	Surface
10/28	1,900	6,234	Asphalt

Statistics (2009)
- Passengers movement: 55488
- Cargo movement: 351 T
- Air operations: 1192
- Sources: GCM

Almirante Padilla Airport (Spanish: Aeropuerto Almirante Padilla) (IATA: RCH, ICAO: SKRH) is an airport serving the Caribbean coastal city of Riohacha in the Guajira Department of Colombia. It is served by Avianca, and formerly by Tiara Air and Viva Air Colombia. The airport is on the southwestern edge of the city.

== Airlines and destinations ==
The following airlines operate regular scheduled and charter flights at the airport:

Airlines	Destinations
Avianca	Bogotá, Medellin–JMC
LATAM Colombia	Bogotá
SATENA	Barranquilla

== See also ==
- Transport in Colombia
- List of airports in Colombia
