= Alfonso López Pumarejo Airport =

Alfonso López Pumarejo Airport Aeropuerto Alfonso López Pumarejo
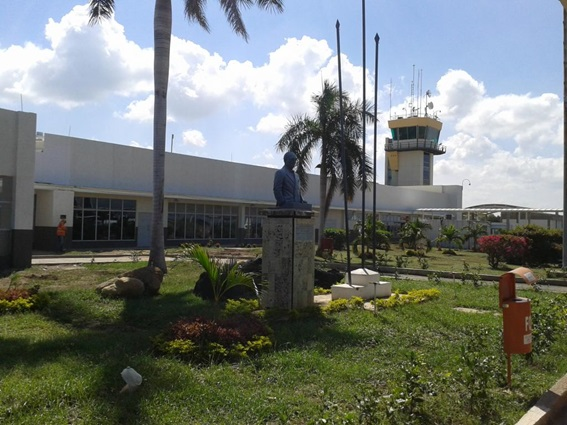
- IATA: VUP; ICAO: SKVP

Summary
- Airport type: Public
- Operator: Aerocivil Colombia
- Serves: Valledupar, Colombia
- Elevation AMSL: 485 ft (148 m)
- Coordinates: 10°26′00″N 73°14′59″W

Map
- Location within Cesar Department Location within Colombia

Runways
| Direction | Length | | Surface |
| Direction | m | ft | Surface |
|---|---|---|---|
| 02/20 | 2,100 | 6,890 | Asphalt |

Statistics (2011)
- Passengers: 286,199
- Cargo Tonnes: 827
- Aircraft operations: 6,853
- Sources: WAD GCM

Alfonso López Pumarejo Airport (Spanish: Aeropuerto Alfonso López Pumarejo) (IATA: VUP, ICAO: SKVP) is a domestic airport serving the city of Valledupar, Colombia, and also serving as a small Colombian Air Force and Colombian Police air base. The airport is operated by Aerocivil. Two commercial passenger airlines serve the airport, Clic and Avianca.

== Airlines and destinations ==
| Airlines | Destinations |
|---|---|
| Avianca | Bogotá |
| Clic | Barranquilla, Medellín–Olaya Herrera |
| SATENA | Barranquilla |

== See also ==
- Transport in Colombia
- List of airports in Colombia
