= Simón Bolívar International Airport (Colombia) =

Airport in Colombia

Simón Bolívar International Airport Aeropuerto internacional Simón Bolívar
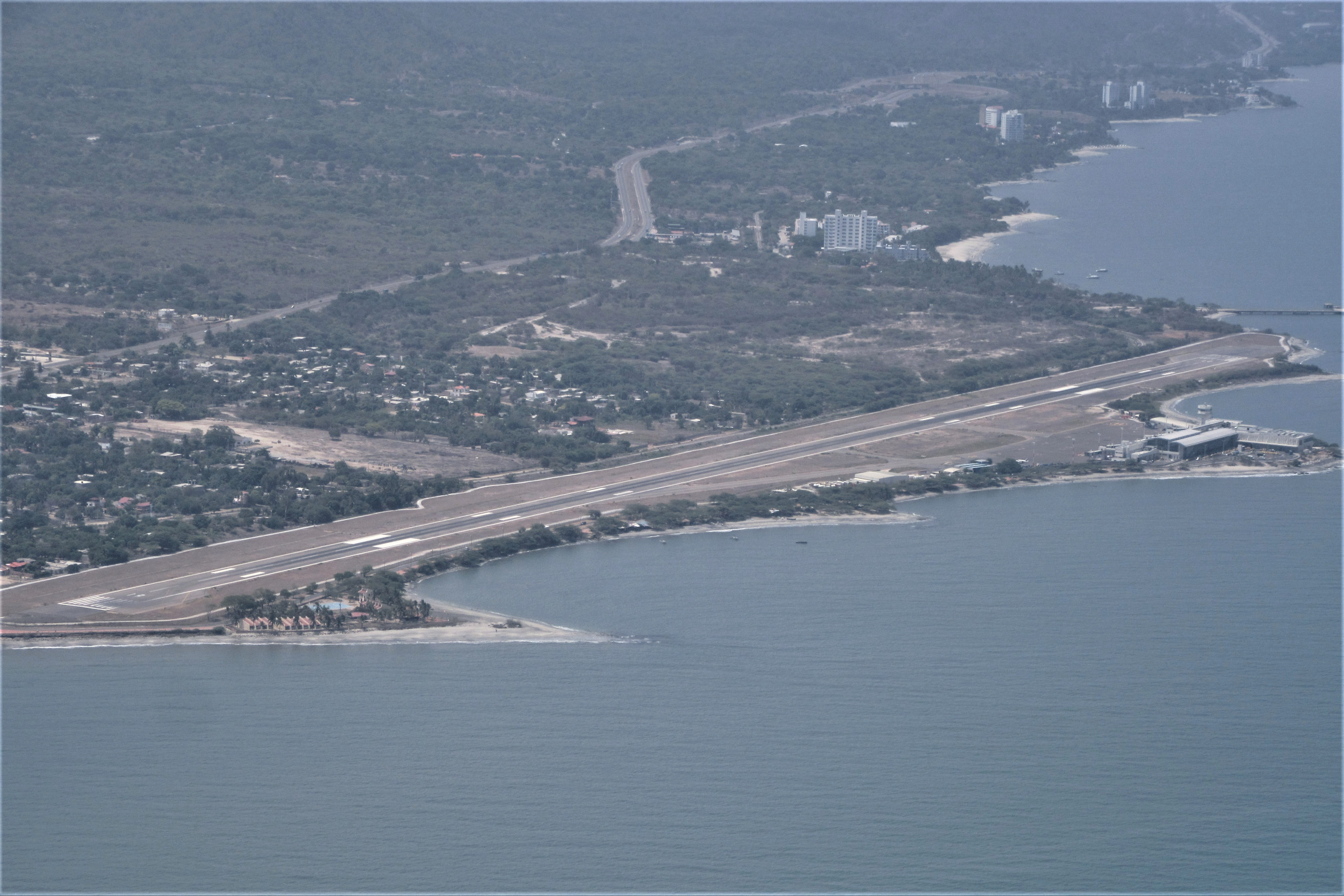
- IATA: SMR; ICAO: SKSM

Summary
- Airport type: Public
- Operator: Aeropuertos de Oriente
- Serves: Santa Marta, Colombia
- Elevation AMSL: 22 ft / 7 m
- Coordinates: 11°07′10″N 74°13′50″W
- Website: smr.aerooriente.com.co

Map
- Location of airport in Colombia

Runways
Direction	Length		Surface
Direction	m	ft	Surface
01/19	1,700	5,577	Asphalt

Statistics (2024)
- Passengers movement: 3,695,605 ▲27.5%
- Air operations: 27,731
- Cargo movement (T): –
- Ranking in Colombia: 5th
- Source: Aerocivil Google Maps

Simón Bolívar International Airport (Spanish: Aeropuerto Internacional Simón Bolívar) (IATA: SMR, ICAO: SKSM) is an international airport serving the city of Santa Marta, Colombia. The airport is located 14 kilometres (8.7 mi) south of Santa Marta city center, on the shores of the Caribbean Sea. 18 kilometres (11 mi) north of the municipality of Ciénaga in Colombia.

It is operated by Aeropuertos De Oriente S.A.S., through a concession agreement with Aerocivil. It is the international airport of Colombia with the shortest runway, 1700 meters long.

It is named in honor of Simón Bolívar, the military and political leader who played a leading role in the establishment of several South American countries as sovereign states, and who died in Santa Marta in 1830. The airport name is also currently the name of the airport in Maiquetía (Caracas), Venezuela.

== History ==
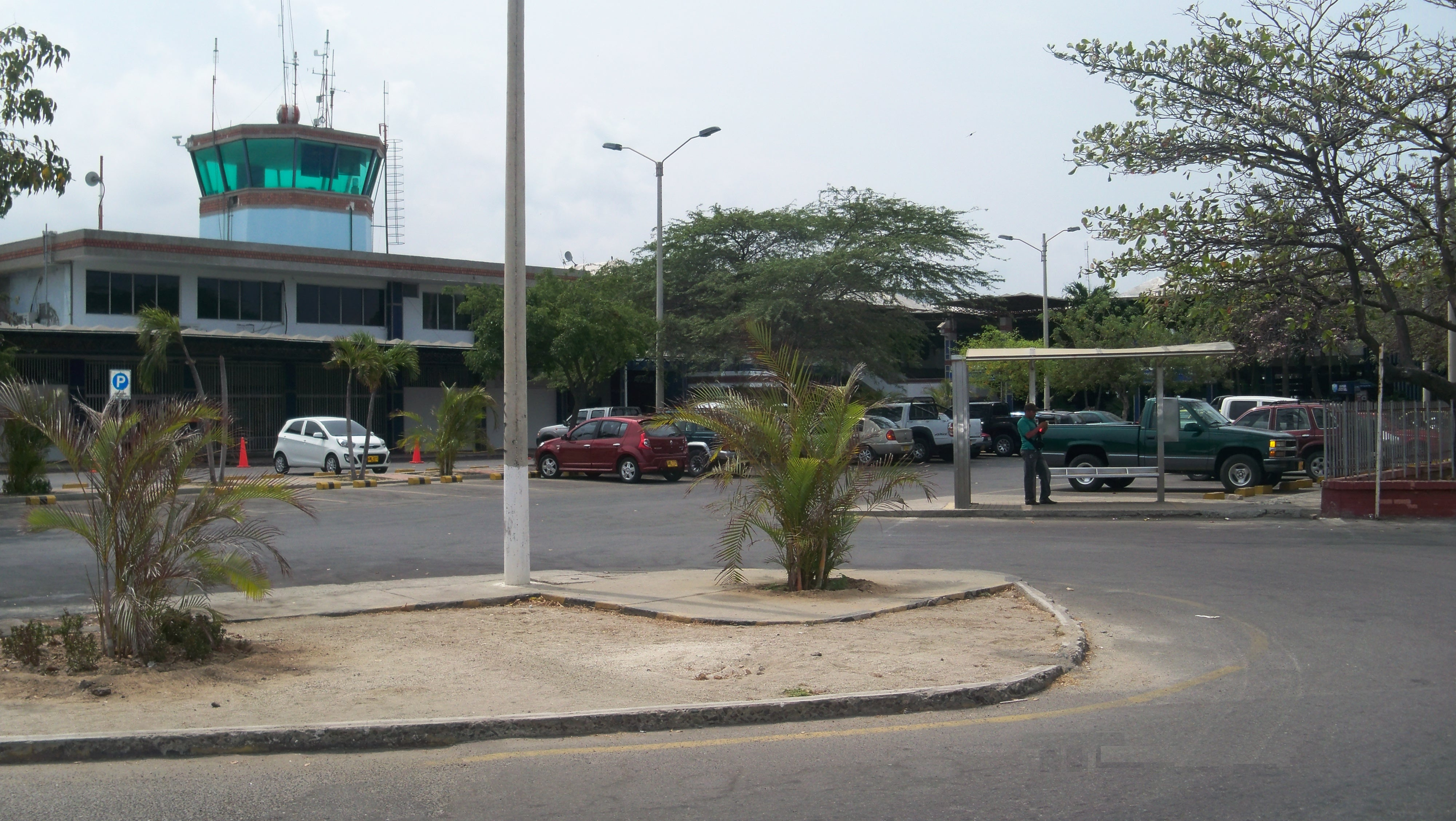
Old and outdated Simon Bolivar Airport in 2014

=== Construction ===
The construction of the Santa Marta airport was inaugurated on 8 December 1949, by the company Líneas Aéreas Nacionales, for the Magdalena Department, a modern airport that will satisfy pressing and urgent regional needs. Back in those days, the airport had exceptional location conditions since it was used to operate by water and land. The dirt track was located parallel to the sea and is built in two stages: the first 1,200 meters long and the second with an extension to 1,000. For the operation of seaplanes, there is sufficient depth.

These ships can reach about 50 meters from the airport building. The preliminary plans for the terminal building were under study and approval by the Aerocivil and once approved the LANZA Company began its construction to complete it in the shortest possible time. it was also equipped with a modern control tower with all the devices for meteorological observations. At present, the ground movement works at Simón Bolívar Airport was progressing satisfactorily, under the direction of LANZA's engineering chief, Enrique Pérez Ayala. Santa Marta has, in its airport, a key to its development and progress.

The airport was recognized as an international airport in 2007.

=== Viva Air Colombia Hub (2018-2019) ===
In May 2018, Viva Air Colombia announced the opening of its third operational base in Santa Marta airport, which began in October 2018 and became the first airline to operate as a hub in the airport. The new hub provided connections to destinations such as Bucaramanga, Pereira and San Andrés, ended at the beginning of 2019. In August 2018, Viva Air Colombia announced an international route to Miami from Santa Marta airport, which started on 18 December 2018. The route ended in April 2019.

== Facilities ==
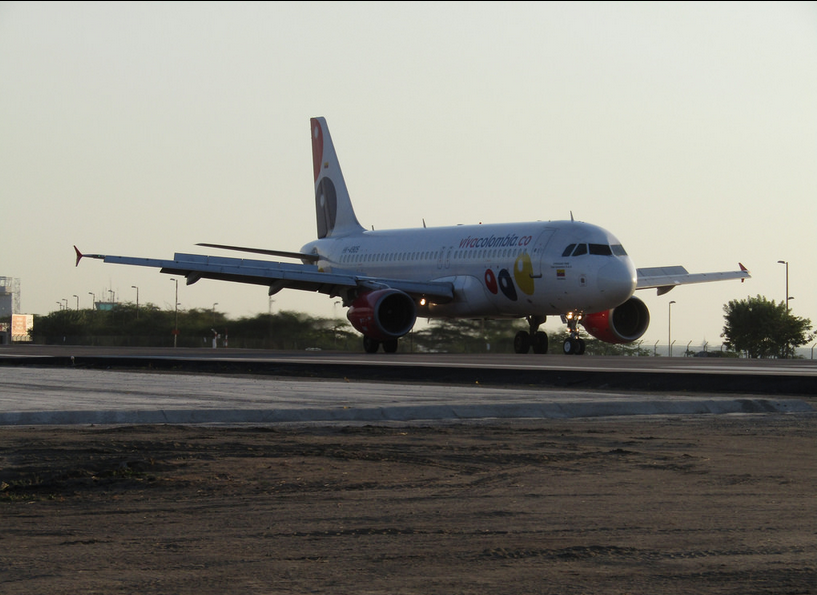
Airbus A320 Viva Air Colombia at the airport

The airport has a new medical health care facility for primary services, a new check-in area, airline offices, a new food square, renovated restrooms, and indoor ATMs. Avianca, Jetsmart Colombia, LATAM Colombia, and Wingo are the only commercial carriers that operate domestic passenger flights and Copa Airlines as the only international airline in the airport. The airport resides at an elevation of 22 feet (7 m) above mean sea level. It has one runway designated 01/19 with an asphalt surface measuring 1,700 by 40 metres (5,577 ft × 131 ft).

The Santa Marta VOR/DME (Ident: STA) is located 9.7 nautical miles (18.0 km) south of the airport.

== Renovation and expansion ==
=== 2015 - 2018 ===
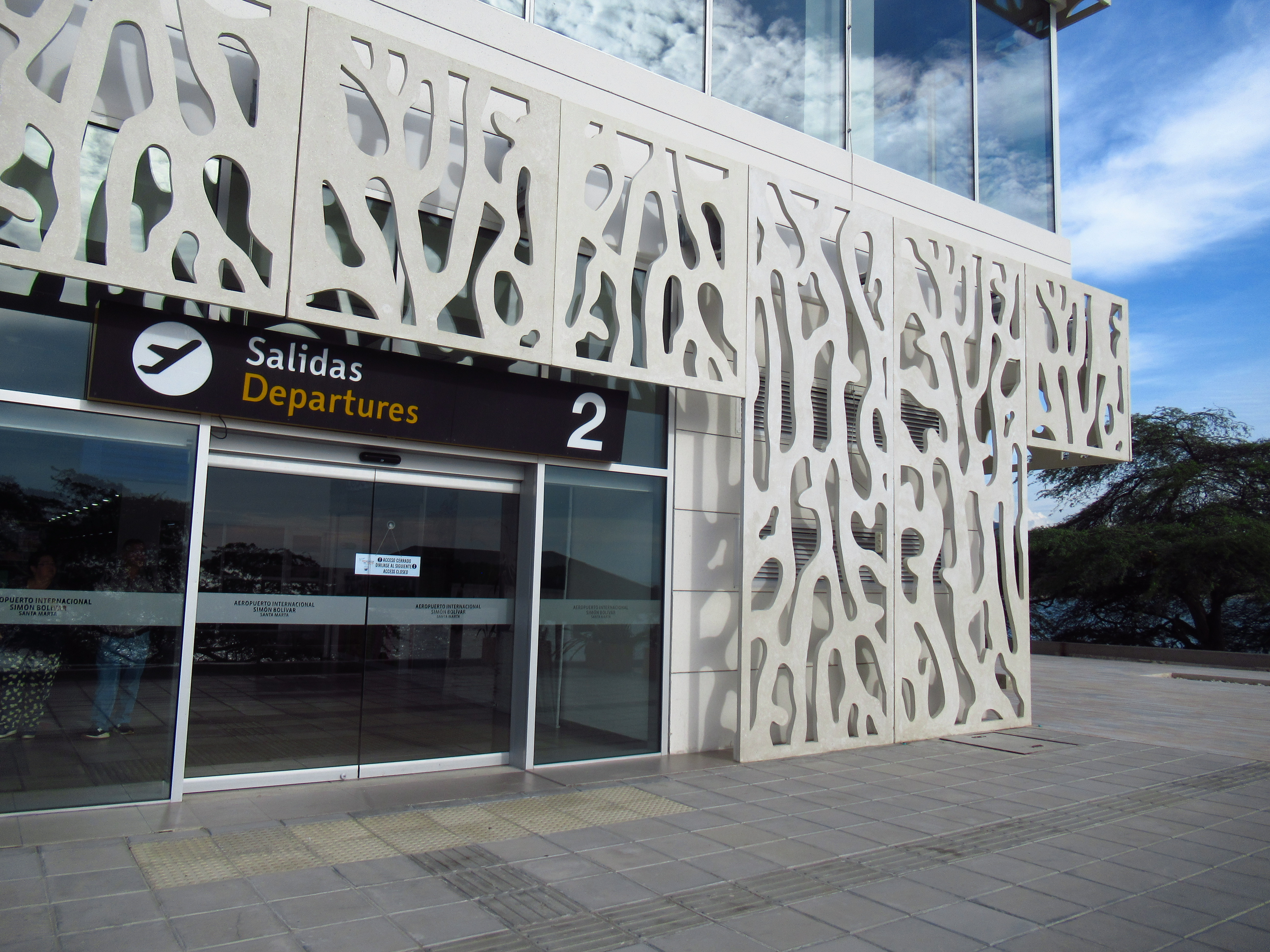
Terrace of the airport with departure entrance

The airport facilities were outdated and insufficient for the recent increase of tourism in Santa Marta, which had between 1.5 million and 1.7 million domestic passengers in 2016 and 2017. Renovation of the airport facilities began on 2 February 2015. The project investment had an investment of more than 109,500 million COP (US$37 million, approximately) and it took 36 months (3 years) to be completely expanded and renovated.

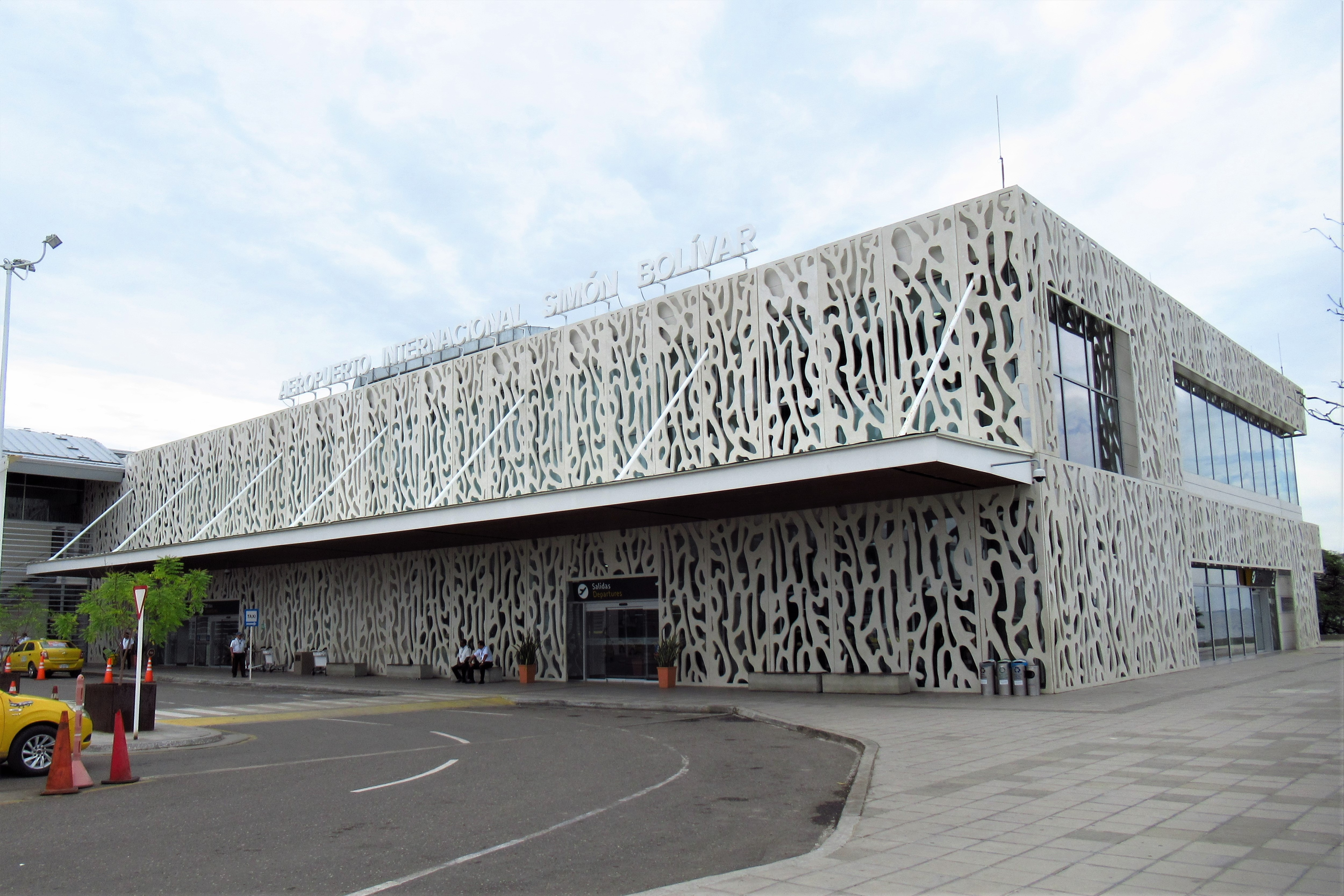
Renovated airport entrance

This renovation comprises the expansion of the new terminal building from 6,271 m^{2} (67,500 sq ft) to 15,413 m^{2} (165,900 sq ft) with a spacious check-in area with 24 counters and capacity to serve up to 2.6 million passengers per year.

The parking lot was increased from 2,070 m^{2} (22,300 sq ft) to 5,742 m^{2} (61,810 sq ft), and has parking for 33 taxis and 7 minibuses. The underground parking lot has space for 170 cars and 44 motorcycles, five baggage carousels, and new air-conditioning systems.

The apron area went from 19,396 m^{2} (208,780 sq ft) to 30,702 m^{2} (330,470 sq ft), with five glass-walled jet bridges capable of taking Airbus A318, A319, A320, Embraer 170, Embraer 190, Boeing 737 and 767 aircraft.

The new control tower is 22.6 metres (74 ft) high with eight floors and independent access. It has operated since 31 May 2016.

The renovation and expansion of the airport were completed in February 2018.

=== 2025 - 2027 ===
The Airport in Santa Marta, after 8 years since the terminal building was constructed, will be subject to new interventions to its infrastructure that will allow it to expand its capacity and improve the service to national and international passengers.

With this renovation promoted by the Government of Change, the airport terminal will go from serving 3.6 million to 5.8 million national and international passengers. It will expand the infrastructure from 15,413 m^{2} (165,900 sq ft) to 19,153 m^{2} (206,160 sq ft) by 3,740m2 and increase the operational capacity of the air terminal, with an investment of $75 billion COP (US$21.7 million, approximately) and a maximum execution time of 2 years, until 2027.

=== Runway extension ===
The airport's runway is surrounded by the beach and sea, which restricts its length. Because of the short runway, it is one of the shortest of any major airport in Colombia. Passenger and Cargo airliners have never arrived on aircraft larger than the Airbus A321 or equivalent. No wide-body passenger airliners have ever been scheduled at Santa Marta airport.

In March 2017, when Germán Vargas Lleras was the Vice President of Colombia, he stated that the extension of the runway would be extended over the sea and would cost 350,000 million COP (US$70 million, approx). The National Government would invest 200,000 million COP in the runway, with the rest invested by the Magdalena Department. It never happened.

The runway would have met the minimum length requirements for the operation of wide-body aircraft and also international destinations. The runway would go over the sea from Category C3 1,700 by 40 metres (5,577 ft × 131 ft) to Category D4 2,200 by 45 metres (7,218 ft × 148 ft).

In June 2026, the Civil Aeronautics Authority (Aeronautica Civil) confirmed that the runway extension at the Simón Bolívar International Airport in Santa Marta will reach meters 3,000 by 45 metres (9,843 ft × 148 ft) in length. It will cost 1,8 billones COP (US$5 million, approx.)

== Airlines and destinations ==
=== Passenger ===
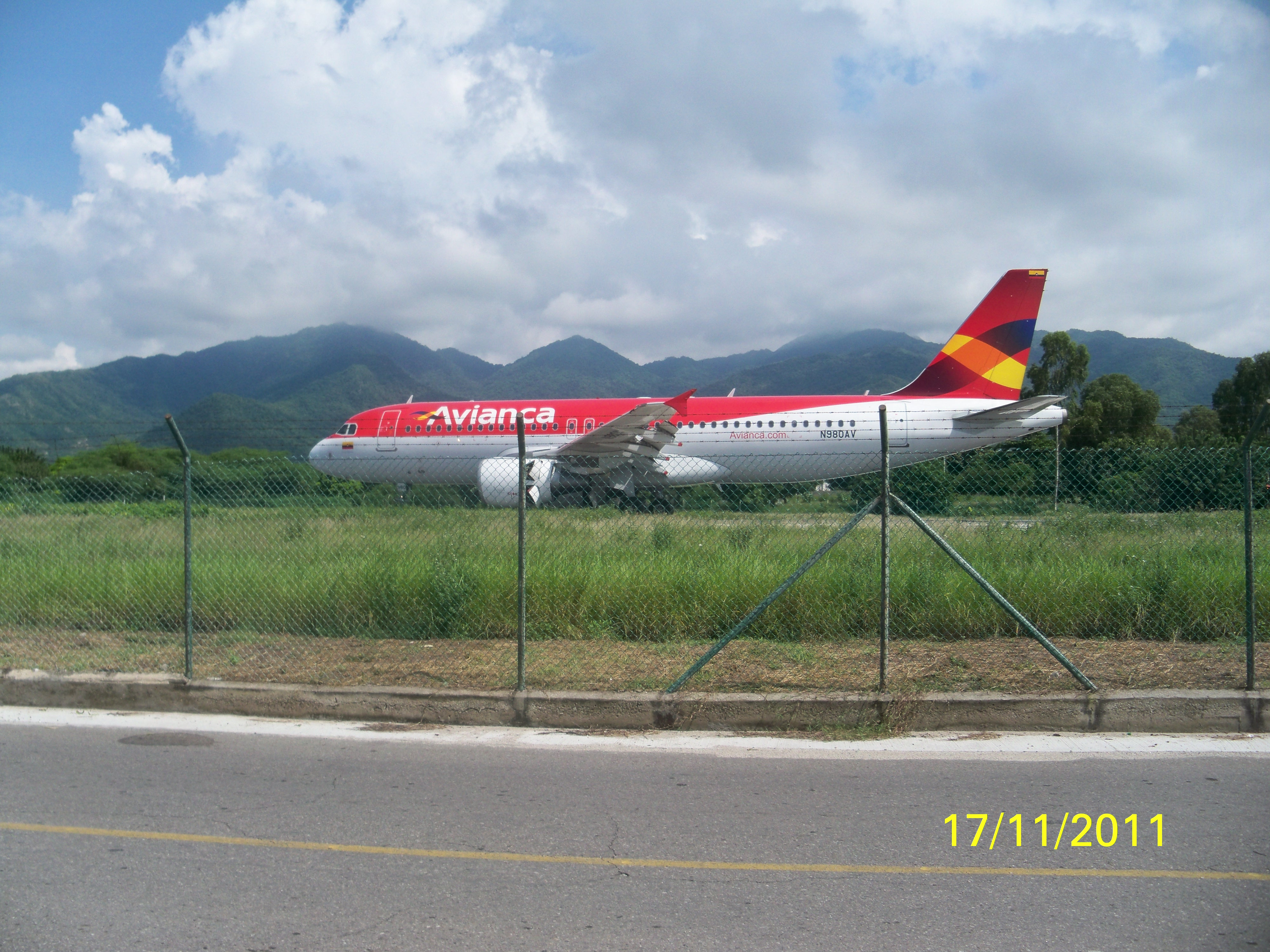
An Avianca Airbus A320 taxiing at the runway

Airlines	Destinations
Avianca	Bogotá, Cali, Medellín–JMC, Pereira
Copa Airlines	Panama City–Tocumen
JetSmart Colombia	Bogotá, Cali, Medellín–JMC
LATAM Colombia	Bogotá
Wingo	Bogotá, Bucaramanga, Medellín–JMC

=== Cargo ===
Airlines	Destinations
Aerosucre	Bogotá

== Statistics ==
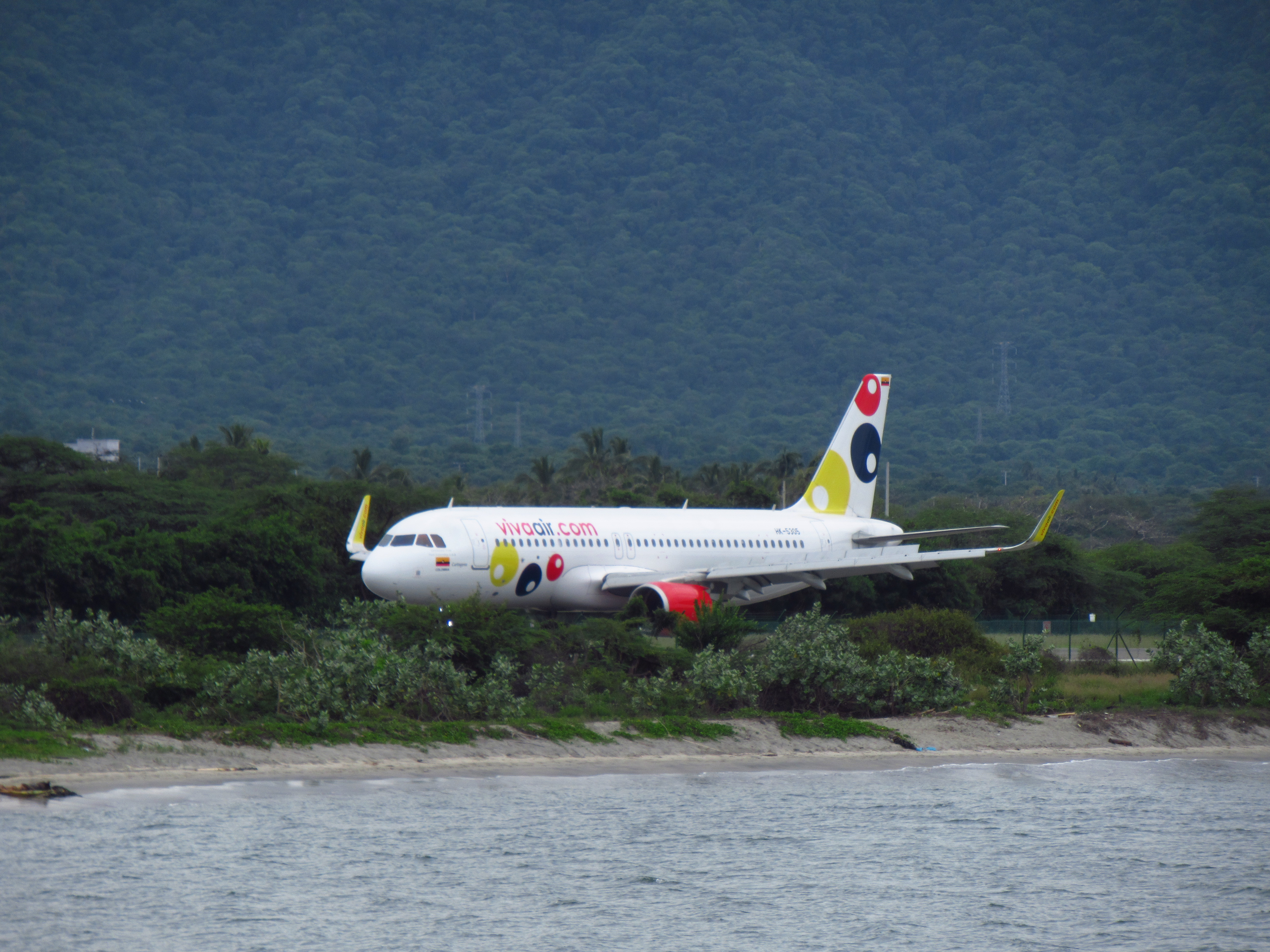
A Viva Air Colombia Airbus A320 arriving to the runway

Movements	2024	2023	2022	2021	2020	2019	2018	2017	2016	2015	2014	2013	2012	2011	2010	2009
Passengers	3,695,605	2,898,463	3,745,615	2,642,916	790,298	2,372,863	2,030,307	1,722,759	1,528,188	1,457,078	1,222,709	1,265,030	1,014,985	866,260	843,919	555,532

=== Busiest domestic routes (2018) ===
Rank	Destination	Passengers	Airlines
1.	Bogotá, Cundinamarca	1,293,899	Avianca, LATAM Colombia, Viva Air Colombia
2.	Medellín, Antioquia	461,078	Avianca, LATAM Colombia, Viva Air Colombia
3.	Cali, Valle del Cauca	107,108	Avianca

== Ground transportation ==
=== Public Transport ===
Santa Marta Airport is also easily accessible by bus, operated by SETP and STU.

=== Car ===
Simon Bolivar Airport is located near the motorway Transversal del Caribe

=== Taxi ===
Taxis are available at Taxicab stand located outside the Terminal.

== Incidents and accidents ==
- On 4 August 1982, Aerotal, flight HK-2559, a Boeing 727 aircraft, landed several meters before reaching the head of the runway, bounced off the runway and lost the left main landing gear, causing the aircraft to leave the track and end up in the safety zone.
- On 29 November 1982, Aerotal, flight HK-2560, a Boeing 727 aircraft, suffered a hydraulic fault and when landing, the left main wheel was retracted and the jet left the runway.
- On 17 July 2007, AeroRepública flight 7330, an Embraer ERJ-190 aircraft, overshot the runway, went down an embankment, and ended up with the front end of the aircraft immersed on the ocean.
- On 16 October 2022, a Cirrus Vision SF50 registered HK-5342 overran the runway, went through the airport fence, crossed the road and crashed into a tree on the north of the beach known as "Playa Dormida" . Everyone in the aircraft survived with mild injuries. There was a single fatality and 8 people injured.

== In popular culture ==
- The airport appears in the movie American Made, starring Tom Cruise, about an American pilot recruited by the CIA for covert operations of Colombian drug kingpin Pablo Escobar and then was a DEA informant. The movie was released on 29 September 2017.

== See also ==
- Transport in Colombia
- List of airports in Colombia
