= El Edén International Airport =

El Edén International Airport Aeropuerto Internacional El Edén
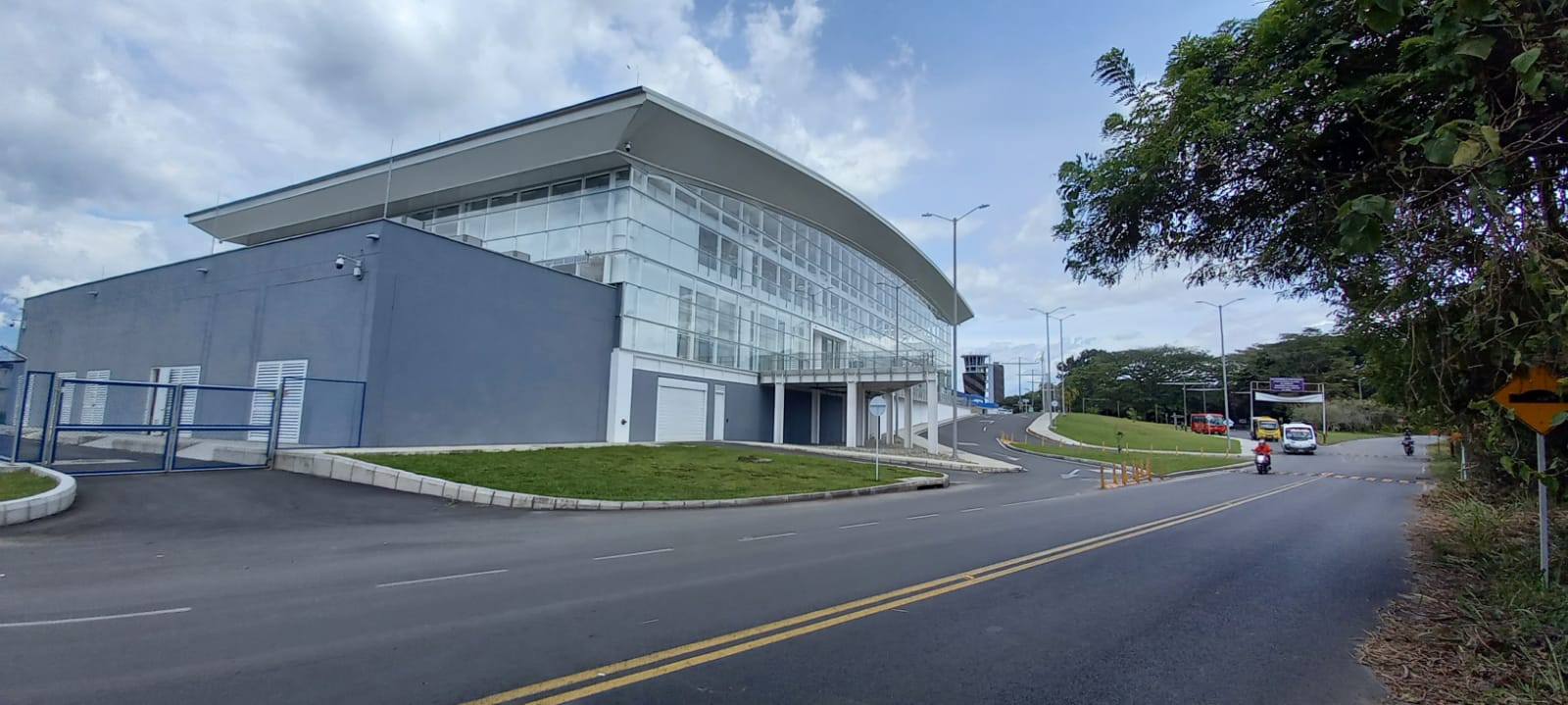
- IATA: AXM; ICAO: SKAR

Summary
- Airport type: Public
- Owner: Aerocivil
- Serves: Armenia, Colombia
- Location: La Tebaida, Colombia
- Elevation AMSL: 3,990 ft (1,220 m)
- Coordinates: 04°27′10″N 75°45′58″W
- Website: www.aeropuertoeleden.com Spanish

Map
- Location of airport in Colombia

Runways
| Direction | Length | | Surface |
| Direction | m | ft | Surface |
|---|---|---|---|
| 02/20 | 2,500 | 8,202 | Asphalt |

Statistics (2012)
- Passengers movement: 352.897
- Cargo movement: 755 T
- Air Operations: 14,002
- Sources: WAD GCM

El Edén International Airport (Spanish: Aeropuerto Internacional El Edén) (IATA: AXM, ICAO: SKAR) is an international airport serving Armenia, the capital of the Quindío Department of Colombia. The airport is 13 kilometres (8.1 mi) southwest of Armenia, near the town of La Tebaida. Currently it only handles domestic flights to Bogotá and Medellín.

== Overview ==
Following Armenia's 25 January 1999 earthquake, the airport terminal was rebuilt after much of the original building collapsed. During 2008 and 2009, the airport's runway was extended, the control tower's height was increased, and the terminal building was partly upgraded to include a new international gate and immigration area. As it stands, the airport is capable of receiving aircraft such as Boeing 737, Airbus A319 and A320, McDonnell Douglas MD-80 and Fokker 100.

The first international flight to land at El Edén International Airport was operated by Spirit Airlines on 13 November 2009 from Fort Lauderdale, USA. As of May 2026, Spirit Airlines ceased all operations following its shutdown. No international destinations currently operate from the airport.

The airport's runway and control tower were again damaged in the 2026 Colombia earthquake on 10 August.

== Airlines and destinations ==
The following airlines operate regular scheduled and charter flights at the airport:

| Airlines | Destinations |
|---|---|
| Avianca | Bogotá, Medellín–JMC |
| Avianca Express | Bogotá |
| LATAM Colombia | Bogotá |
| Wingo | Bogotá |

== See also ==
- Transport in Colombia
- List of airports in Colombia
