= Los Garzones Airport =

Los Garzones Airport Aeropuerto Los Garzones
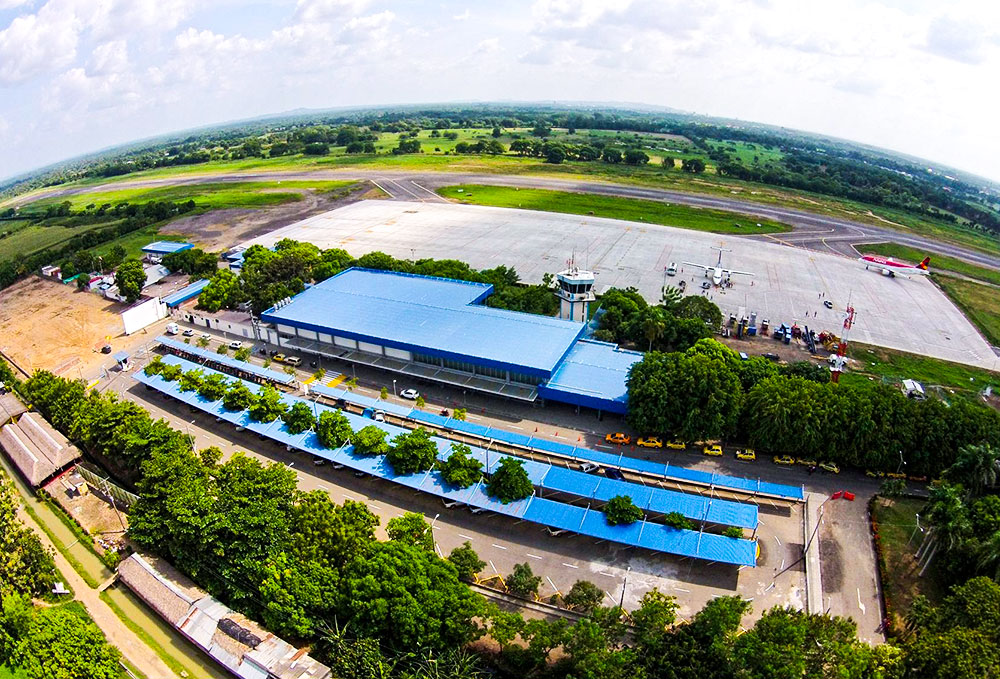
- IATA: MTR; ICAO: SKMR

Summary
- Airport type: Public
- Operator: Grupo Aeroportuario del Sureste
- Serves: Montería and Cereté, Córdoba, Colombia
- Location: Los Garzones
- Opened: 1974
- Hub for: Clic
- Focus city for: Avianca
- Elevation AMSL: 36 ft / 11 m
- Coordinates: 8°49′25″N 75°49′33″W
- Website: aeropuertomonteria.co

Map
- Location of airport in Colombia

Runways
Direction	Length		Surface
Direction	m	ft	Surface
14/32	2,300	7,546	Asphalt

Statistics (2023)
- Total passengers: 1,305,413
- Source: Grupo Aeroportuario del Sureste

Los Garzones Airport (Spanish: Aeropuerto Los Garzones, IATA: MTR, ICAO: SKMR) is an airport serving the city of Montería in the Córdoba Department of Colombia. It is the only airport in the department that can handle modern jets (up to Airbus A330 size). On normal days, the airport receives between 20 and 30 takeoffs and landings, and is one of the busiest airports in Colombia's Caribbean region in terms of passenger flow.

== History ==
The first plane to reach Monteria was a hydrofoil, which was floating on the banks of the Sinu River thanks to the expertise of the German aviator Helmuth Von Krohn. They had been introduced to Colombia by the Colombo German air transport company "Scadta", born in Barranquilla on December 5, 1919. The partners were the Germans Werner Kaemerer, Stuart Hosie, Alberto Tietjen, and the Colombians Ernesto Cortizzos (the first president of the airline), Rafael Palacio, Cristóbal Restrepo, Jacobo Correa, and Aristides Noguera.

These aircraft were of the model Junker F-13, monoplanes of low wing and of completely metallic construction, whose motors had to be modified to be able to operate efficiently in the climatic conditions of the country. They were 9.50 meters long and 3.50 meters high. Its flight capacity was 850 kilometers, and it could carry up to four passengers, in addition to the two crew members. Due to the topography of the country, two floats were adapted to the Junkers in order to land in the rivers of different cities.

The first of the Junker F-13, baptized with the name of Colombia, was brought to Barranquilla in 1920 by a German crew of pilot Helmuth von Krohn and engineers Guillermo Schorbusch and Fritz Hammer. Von Krohn died in 1924 along with Ernesto Cortizzos, when the Junker Tolima plane crashed in Bocas Cenizas.

However, the time of its best commercial moment coincided with the period of the Second World War due to the strategy of the US government, which considered it very dangerous that an airline with so much German influence was flying so close to the Panama Canal, and the German pilots were fired on June 8, 1940. Six days later, on June 14, in the same notary where "Scadta" was created, the deed was signed to convert it into "Avianca".

Aviation had many protagonists in the Sinu territory. In the 1930s, passenger flights from Scadta landed in Montería and Lorica. In the 1940s, Avianca was produced from the liquidation of Scadta and Lansa (Lineas Aéreas Nacionales SA), which also covered Montería and Lorica. In 1947 came the DC3, type C-47, from Sociedad Aeronáutica de Medellín, which initially transported cargo to Planeta Rica.

The old San Jerónimo de Montería airport was inaugurated in 1937 on the land that is now occupied by the San Jerónimo Hospital and the Tacasuán Recreational Center. Avianca started its operations there with the famous Douglas DC-3. These planes arrived in the country in October 1939, and were flying at the incredible speed, at that time, of 200 miles per hour. The most famous DC-3 was the HK-111, commanded by Captain Alfredo Crismatt, baptized by the people as the Doctor, since it "begins with one", "continues with one" and "ends with one".

The arrival of the Douglas DC-4, which required a longer runway, led to the opening of the Berástegui Airport in the 1960s, on the property of the "San Antonio" farm, which was owned by General Gustavo Rojas Pinilla. The next step was the construction of the current airport of Los Garzones, inaugurated in 1974, to open the skies of Córdoba to modern Jets.

In 2016, Montería received 968,481 passengers, while in 2017 it received 943,772 passengers according to data published by the Grupo Aeroportuario del Sureste.

== Renovations ==
From 2014 to 2017, the airport was renovated at a cost of around $100 million USD. The works included runway expansion from 1,900 m to 2,300 m, terminal expansion nearly doubling the previous size, new check-in stands, new concessions, and a new cargo terminal. The runway expansion made the airport capable of handling international flights.

== Airlines and destinations ==
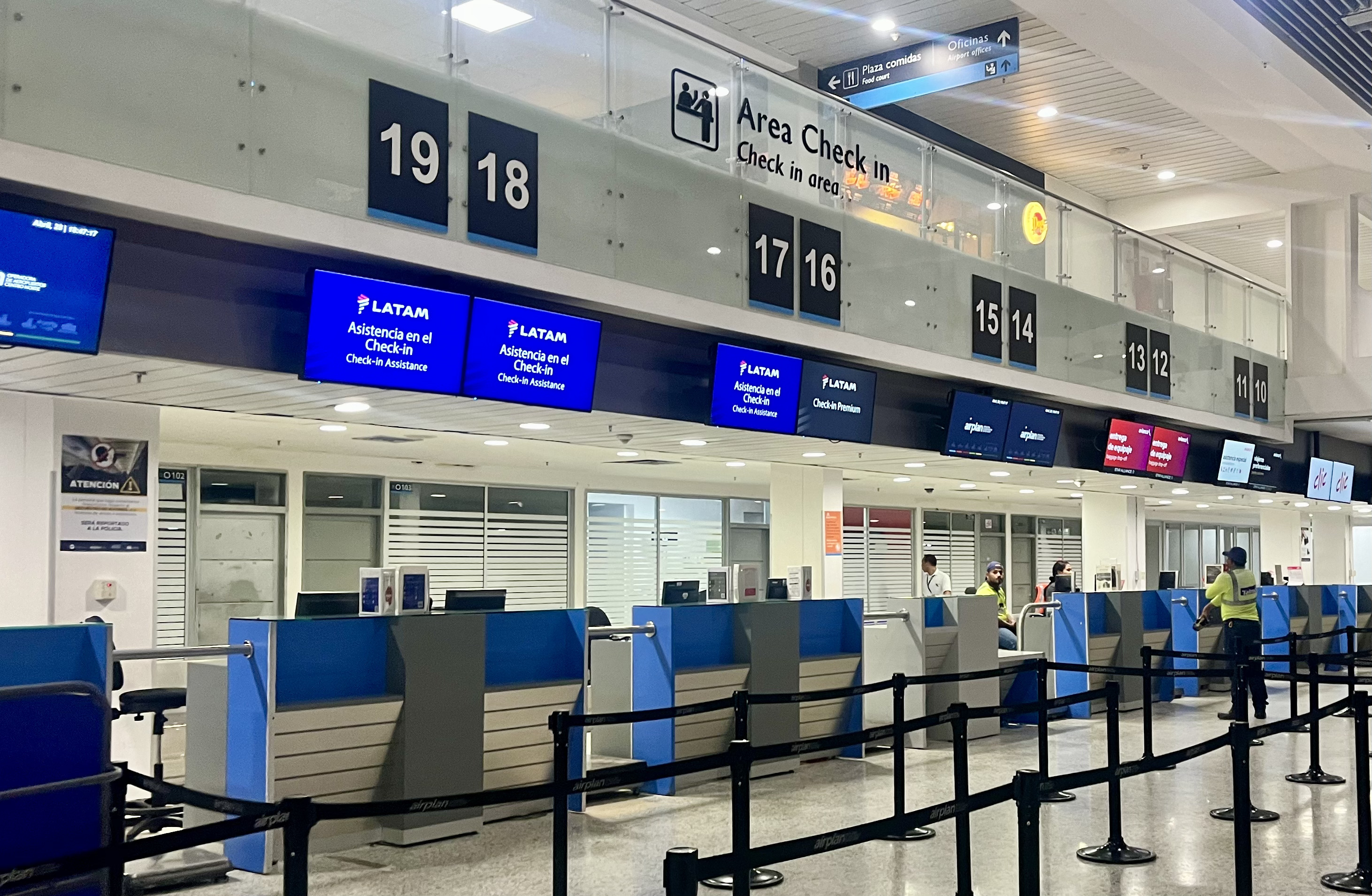
Check-in counters at Los Garzones Airport

=== Passenger ===
Airlines	Destinations
Avianca	Bogotá, Medellin–JMC
Clic	Barranquilla, Medellín–Olaya Herrera
JetSmart Colombia	Bogotá, Medellin–JMC
LATAM Colombia	Bogotá, Medellin–JMC

== Accidents and incidents ==
- On May 15, 1961, a Douglas C-47 overshot the runway and collided with barbed wire fencing. All 16 occupants were unharmed.
- On May 2, 1990, a Grumman G-159 Gulfstream I ran off the end of the runway and caught fire. All six occupants exited the plane safely.
- On November 23, 2016, the front landing gear of a general aviation aircraft fell off and caused major damage to the aircraft's underside. Both of the aircraft's occupants exited safely.

== See also ==
- Transport in Colombia
- List of airports in Colombia
