= Matecaña International Airport =

Matecaña International Airport Aeropuerto Internacional Matecaña
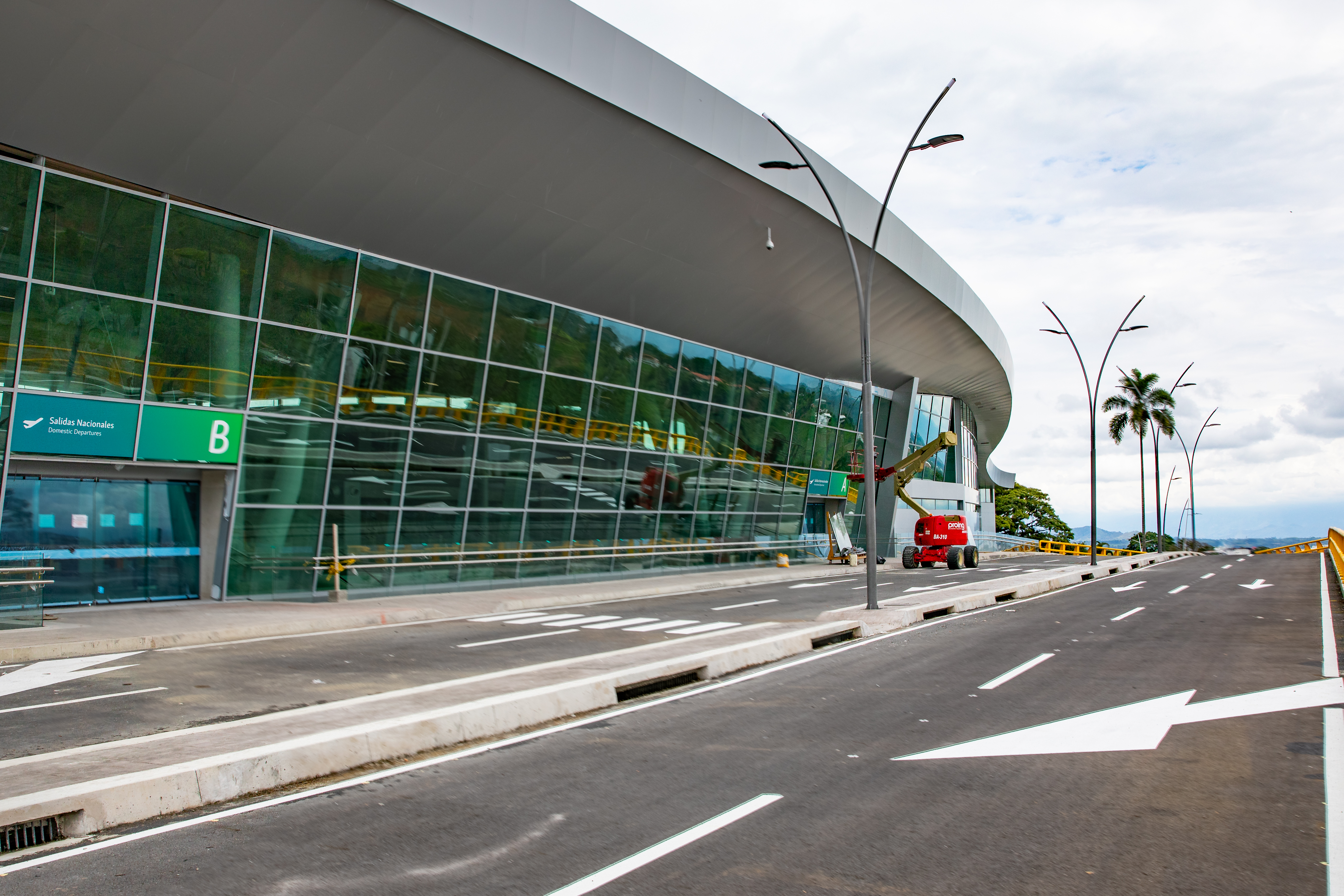
- IATA: PEI; ICAO: SKPE

Summary
- Airport type: Public
- Owner: The city of Pereira
- Serves: Pereira, Colombia
- Elevation AMSL: 4,418 ft (1,347 m)
- Coordinates: 4°48′45″N 75°44′25″W
- Website: www.aeromate.gov.co

Map
- Location of airport in Colombia

Runways
Direction	Length		Surface
Direction	m	ft	Surface
08/26	2,205	7,234	Asphalt

Statistics (2015)
- Aircraft operations: 21,088
- Passengers: 1,890,088
- Cargo tonnage: 4526
- Sources: GCM

Matecaña International Airport (Spanish: Aeropuerto Internacional de Matecaña, IATA: PEI, ICAO: SKPE) is an international airport serving the city of Pereira, Colombia. It also serves as an alternate airport for the cities of Armenia, Cartago, Manizales, Medellín, Cali, and Bogotá.

The airport lies along the edge of a deep ravine, 2 kilometres (1.2 mi) west of Pereira. There are steep dropoffs on the sides and ends of the runway. There is high terrain in all quadrants except south.

== History ==
The airport was built between 1944 and 1947. Its first official flight was a C-47 piloted by captain Luis Carlos Londoño Iragorrion on 24 July 1947. The city of Pereira owns and manages the terminal building, while the operations are in charge of Aerocivil, being the only airport in Colombia under these conditions. It handles 75 percent of passengers in the coffee region, with an average of 30 daily commercial operations to different destinations.

The passenger terminal is a four-level building built in the early 1970s. The first level includes parking positions for the airplanes and a baggage claim area. The second/main floor has the check-in counters, airline offices, and domestic and international arrival doors. The third floor has the general waiting room, toilets, stores, restaurants and cafés, free Internet Wi-Fi, a device charging station, and a VIP lounge operated by Avianca. Also on this level is security access for the two domestic waiting rooms. The international waiting room is here, with an independent door to the duty-free and security areas. In 1991 two jetways were installed from the domestic waiting rooms. On the fourth level are the airport general offices, a chapel, and two footbridges connecting the terminal with the car parking area, which is in front of the main building.

A new cargo terminal was built to replace the original built in 1978. The new control tower is Colombia's second-most-advanced, behind the tower in El Dorado Airport of Bogotá, also recently built.

The terminal has easy access to public transportation, including taxi area, general bus service and an exclusive stop for the bus rapid transit system, Megabus.

In 2014, the runway was extended to 2,205 metres (1.370 mi; 2,411 yd) to allow for full certification as an international airport.

In December 2016, the CSS Construction Company won the contract to demolish the current terminal and build the new terminal building. This is a public-private alliance in which the CSS company will operate the airport for 20 years while still returning some revenue to the city government. The construction began in November 2017. CSS Construction also has a 30 percent stake in the renovation at El Dorado International Airport in Bogota.

The airport was damaged during the 2026 Colombian earthquake, with three deaths occurring when the terminal partially collapsed.

== Airlines and destinations ==
Airlines	Destinations
Avianca	Bogotá, Medellín–JMC, Cartagena, Santa Marta; Seasonal: New York–JFK,
Clic	Medellín–Olaya Herrera; Seasonal: Cartagena (begins 18 December 2026)
Copa Airlines	Panama City–Tocumen
JetSMART Colombia	Bogotá, Cartagena
LATAM Colombia	Bogotá, Medellín–JMC

== See also ==
- Transport in Colombia
- List of airports in Colombia
