= Colombian Civil Aviation Authority =

Government agency of the Colombian Ministry of Transport

Civil Aviation Authority of Colombia
- Unidad Administrativa Especial de Aeronáutica Civil

Agency overview
- Formed: 30 December 1993
- Preceding agency: Civil Aviation Department
- Headquarters: Avenida El Dorado 103-15 Bogotá, Colombia
- Annual budget: COP$587,487,600,000 (2012); COP$707,471,297,562 (2013); COP$921,685,751,000 (2014)
- Agency executives: Jair Orlando Fajardo Fajardo, Director; Col Alfonso Lozano Ariza, Deputy Director
- Parent agency: Ministry of Transport
- Website: aerocivil.gov.co

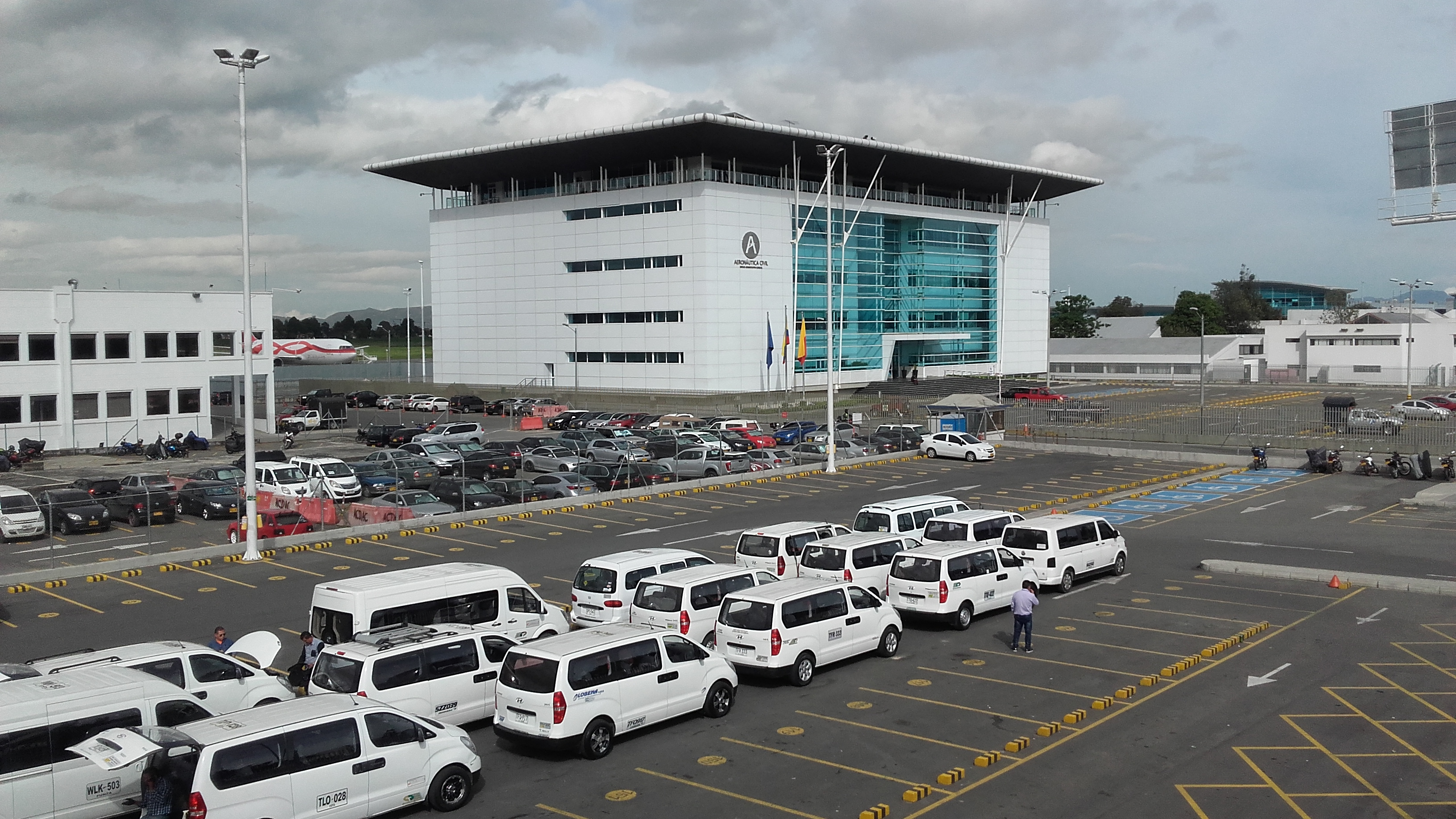
Aerocivil headquarters at El Dorado International Airport

The Civil Aviation Authority of Colombia (Spanish: Unidad Administrativa Especial de Aeronáutica Civil, also known as Aeronáutica Civil, Aerocivil or UAEAC) is a government agency of the Colombian Ministry of Transport. It is the agency in charge of regulating civil aviation, the aviation industry, and of managing the Colombian airspace. Aerocivil is also in charge of managing and controlling all of Colombia's public airports. It is headquartered in the new Aerocivil building on the property of El Dorado International Airport. Previously it was located on the fourth floor of the main terminal building of the airport.

== Agency ==
The Civil Aviation Authority of Colombia is a semi independent agency of the Colombian Ministry of Transport. Aerocivil deals not only with civil aviation, but with general aviation as a whole, excluding military aviation which falls under the Colombian Air Force branch of the Military Forces of Colombia.

The agency also operates two agencies of its own, the Corporation of the Colombian Aeronautic Industry SA (Corporación de la Industria Aeronáutica Colombiana S.A, or CIAC) which is in agency in charge of construction, repair and maintenance of planes and jets, and the Centre for Aeronautic Studies (Centro de Estudios Aeronáuticos, or CEA), which creates programs for training and education in the field of aeronautics.

=== Mission ===
The mission of Aerocivil is to work towards the organized development of civil aviation, the aviation industry, and the safe use of the Colombian airspace, facilitating intermodal transportation, through:

- The regulation of the use of the Colombian airspace and its airport and aeronautic infrastructure.
- The administration of the use of Colombian airspace by means of civil aviation, the airport and aeronautic infrastructure, and the coordination of its relations with that of the military.
- The lending of airport services and support to aviation.
- The exercise of control and observance of operational safety in the air-space sector.
- Implement the principles of quality and social responsibility; focusing its management in the continuous improvement of human talent, the processes and financial viability of the institution, as a strategy for organizational competitiveness.

=== Objectives ===
The objectives of Aerocivil as a government agency are:

- To foment and regulate the development, coverage, and growth of civil aviation, and industry and research into aeronautics, to guarantee national and international geographical connectivity and to contribute to the growth of the economy and Colombian quality of life.
- To guarantee operational safety by means of planning, design, implementation, regulation, and control of the development of civil aviation, guaranteeing the observance of national and international standards and the improvement of the use and conditions of the environment.
- To guarantee the availability and effectiveness of the interactions of customers and the community and the review of their suggestions, needs and requirement.
- To adopt the best practices of management, direction, and control in the compliance methods to fulfill the requirements set by Law, and international standards, that allow the satisfaction of the clients and users, as well as the development and well-being of our employees.
- To guarantee financial sustainability.
- to foment and optimize the mechanisms of investment, commercialization, and exploitation based in private participation and economic sustainability, in the lending of services of public and commercial airport administration, in accordance with the national and international standards of civil aviation.
- To determine the policies of development and regulation pertaining to the aeronautical sector.
- To guarantee the availability of airport infrastructure for the development of commercial activity.
- To select, adopt and maintain the technology applicable to the offering of services associated with the Agency.
- To guarantee the effective Administration of Human Talent, the development of competitiveness and the strengthening of the processes of formation, training, and investigation.

== History ==
During the early 1900s the growth of civil aviation and commercial airlines created the need for their regulation and oversight. In 1919 with the creation of the first Colombian airline, SCADTA, the need for regulation led the government to take the first of such steps. On 31 December 1919, President Marco Fidel Suárez sanctioned Law 126 of 1919, which became the first form of legislation in the country dealing with aviation, making aviation companies, and everything related to aviation subject to government regulations.

On 2 November 1933 during the administration of President Enrique Olaya Herrera, Decree 1080 of 1933 was passed. This decree ascribed matters of civil aviation to the Ministry of Agriculture and Commerce, the next year however, Decree 1682 of 1934, expedited by the newly elect President Alfonso López Pumarejo, ascribed it to the Ministry of War. The Ministry of War now controlled all aspects of aviation in the country, military by the Air Force, and civil by the Department of Civil Aviation (Departamento de Aviación Civil).

As aviation became popular, and new international and national flight routes were created, the government saw the need to create a more organized and independent agency to oversee civil aviation. Was then that Congress passed Law 80 of 1938, which created the Directorate General for Civil Aviation (Dirección General de Aeronáutica), centralizing the management of civil aviation into one agency. The agency was still part of the Ministry of War, but had gained more independence in management and finances, and was now in charge of the operations of aerodromes, airways, aeronautic radiocommunications, meteorology, and oversight.

On 18 October 1951 a change of name and command was implemented during the administration of President Laureano Gómez, who by means of Decree 1956 of 1951, created the National Department of Civil Aviation (Departamento Nacional de Aeronáutica Civil), replacing the name and placing it under the authority of the Ministry of Public Works.

On 18 June 1960, the National Government created by Decree 1721 of 1960 the Civil Aviation Department (Departamento Administrativo de Aeronáutica Civil, DAAC), which was assigned specific technical and administrative duties to define aeronautic policy. In 1992 the DAAC merged with the National Aeronautic Fund (Fondo Aeronáutico Nacional), broadening its services and responsibilities.

On 30 December 1993, the Colombian Congress passed Law 105 of 1993, which created the Civil Aviation Authority of Colombia. It replaced the DAAC and was placed under the administration of the Ministry of Transportation. The agency officially went into operation on 1 February 1994, with officials being sworn in again, and 450 employees laid off.

== See also ==
- Transport in Colombia
- Migración Colombia

Accidents investigated by the agency

- AIRES Flight 8250
- Air France Flight 422
- American Airlines Flight 965
- LaMia Flight 2933
- TAME Flight 120
