= Palonegro International Airport =

Airport serving Bucaramanga, Colombia

Palonegro International Airport Aeropuerto Internacional de Palonegro
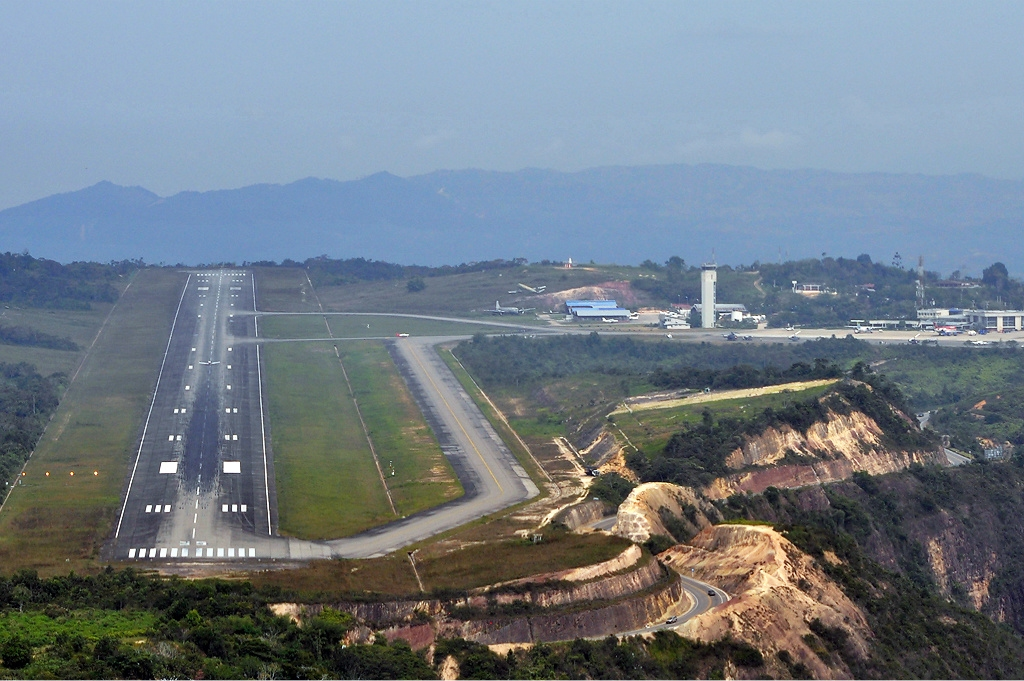
- IATA: BGA; ICAO: SKBG

Summary
- Airport type: Public
- Operator: Aerocivil
- Serves: Bucaramanga
- Opened: August 1974; 52 years ago
- Hub for: EasyFly
- Elevation AMSL: 1,189 m (3,901 ft)
- Coordinates: 7°07′35″N 73°11′05″W

Map
- Location of airport in Colombia

Runways
Direction	Length		Surface
Direction	m	ft	Surface
17/35	2,170	7,119	Asphalt

Statistics (2018)
- Air operations: 41.959
- Passenger movement: 1,944,086
- Cargo movement (T): 5.599
- Sources: GCM

Palonegro International Airport (IATA: BGA, ICAO: SKBG) is an international airport located 7 kilometres (4.3 mi) west of Bucaramanga in the Santander Department of Colombia. The airport serves the Bucaramanga Metropolitan Area and surrounding towns and is served by domestic and international flights.

The airport was built over the mountains surrounding the Bucaramanga plateau. A mountain road connects the city with the airport, which is located at about 1,200 m above sea level. The airport was built on the site of the Battle of Palonegro, which took place during the Thousand Days War in the early 20th century.

The airport receives flights from major cities in Colombia as well as international flights from Panama City and the United States. The main terminal is 25 minutes from the city in the fast lane of the highway west to Giron. It is currently the eighth largest airport in Colombia in terms of passenger movement.

== History ==
Bucaramanga was formerly served by Gómez Niño Airport, which was built by SCADTA in late 1938, when operations began with Junkers F-13 aircraft. The airport was purchased by the Colombian Aerodrome Administration in 1954 and was one of the few airports in Colombia that operated two runways simultaneously. Their X-configuration allowed their use depending on the prevailing winds. Avianca and Taxader had its headquarters at the airport.

Gómez Niño was located within the urban area of the city. It had poor conditions for security and air navigation, and was the site of several fatal air accidents. The new Palonegro airport was therefore constructed. Construction began in 1967, and included major levelling work as the site consisted of a number of hills and canyons up to 60 metres deep. The new airport was opened by the President Misael Pastrana in August 1974, and the inaugural flight took place on a Boeing 727 Avianca, commanded by Captain Alvaro Barrera Gómez. The total cost of construction was $230 million pesos.

== Renovation ==
The airport was renovated from 2014 to 2018. The newly renovated airport was inaugurated by president Juan Manuel Santos in February 2018. The cost of the renovation was approximately $7 million. The renovation increased annual passenger capacity from 1.8 to 2.5 million people per year, and consisted of the expansion of the departures hall, check-in areas, baggage claim areas, airline offices, and new jet bridges. The terminal's floor area was more than doubled, going from 7,400 m^{2} (80,000 ft^{2}) to nearly 19,000 m^{2} (200,000 ft^{2}).

== Operations ==
Seventy to eighty daily flights are now carried out by scheduled airlines, serving five domestic destinations: Avianca, Copa Airlines Colombia, EasyFly and Satena. The airport has international flights to Tocumen International Airport through Copa Airlines.

== Airlines and destinations ==
The following airlines operate regular scheduled and charter flights at the airport:

Airlines	Destinations
Avianca	Bogotá, Cartagena, Medellin–JMC
Clic	Arauca, Cúcuta, Medellín–Olaya Herrera, Saravena; Seasonal: Cartagena (begins 26 December 2026)
Copa Airlines	Panama City–Tocumen
JetSmart Colombia	Bogotá
LATAM Colombia	Bogotá
SATENA	Arauca, Barranquilla, Saravena
Wingo	Barranquilla, Bogotá, Cartagena, Medellín–JMC, Santa Marta; Seasonal: Aruba

== Accidents and incidents ==
- On 14 December 1977, a Vickers Viscount HK-1267 of TAC Colombia was damaged beyond repair while landing. The airplane bounced heavily and then turned into a violent loop, collapsing the nose and landing gear. There were no injuries among the passengers.
- On 12 April 1999, five members of the National Liberation Army hijacked a Fokker 50 carrying 46 people. They took everyone on the aircraft as hostages into the jungle near Simití. The hostages were then taken to boats on the Magdalena River. Ransom payments were demanded for the hostages. Women and children were soon released but 35 passengers were held for over a year.
- On 19 February 2000, a Beechcraft 1900C-1 en route to Camilo Daza International Airport was hijacked by an armed prisoner. The prisoner was not handcuffed. A few minutes after takeoff, the prisoner showed a knife and forced his way into the cockpit. He forced the pilots to land in a small airstrip in the jungle. He then escaped the plane and took one of the guards as a hostage. A military unit tracked down the plane and the hijacker, chasing and killing him shortly afterwards and also releasing the hostage.
- On 24 December 2014, all passengers were killed when a Cessna 207 belonging to regional airline Alas de Colombia, carrying 7 people on board, crashed en route from Palonegro International Airport to Jerónimo de Aguayo Airport in Málaga after attempting to return to the airport due to a mechanical failure. According to the investigation, the primary cause of the crash was that the plane was overweight, but was also due to pilot error by flying the plane too low, and failure of the pilot to contact ATC regarding his status. The crash site was near the town of Piedecuesta, about 10 miles away from Bucaramanga. There were no survivors and all the bodies were recovered in the following days.

== See also ==
- Transport in Colombia
- List of airports in Colombia
