= Flight 630 =

Flight 630 may refer to:

- Avianca Flight 630, involved in the 1972 Las Palomas mid-air collision on 29 July 1972
- Aeroflot Flight 630, crashed on 24 February 1973
- Royal Air Maroc Flight 630, crashed on 21 August 1994
- FedEx Express Flight 630, crashed on 28 July 2006
