= 1972 Las Palomas mid-air collision =

Mid-air collision between two Douglas DC-3s over Colombia

1972 Las Polomas mid-air collision Avianca Flight 630 · Avianca Flight 626
- Wreckage of one of the aircraft involved, pictured around 48 years after the accident

Accident
- Date: July 29, 1972
- Summary: Mid-air collision due to pilot recklessness and fatigue
- Site: Near Mámbita, Colombia
- Total fatalities: 38
- Total survivors: 0

First aircraft
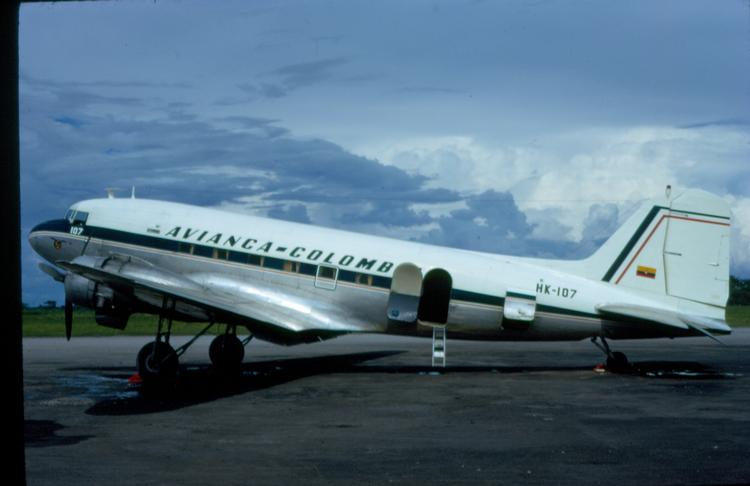
- HK-107, the first aircraft involved
- Type: Douglas DC-3A
- Operator: Avianca
- Call sign: AVIANCA 630
- Registration: HK-107
- Flight origin: La Vanguardia Airport, Colombia
- 1st stopover: Paz de Ariporo Airport, Colombia
- 2nd stopover: Santiago Pérez Quiroz Airport, Colombia
- Destination: Los Colonizadores Airport, Colombia
- Occupants: 21
- Passengers: 18
- Crew: 3
- Fatalities: 21
- Survivors: 0

Second aircraft
- Type: Douglas DC-3A
- Operator: Avianca
- Call sign: AVIANCA 626
- Registration: HK-1341
- Flight origin: La Vanguardia Airport, Colombia
- 1st stopover: El Alcaraván Airport, Colombia
- 2nd stopover: Trinidad Airport, Colombia
- 3rd stopover: Orocue Airport, Colombia
- Destination: Las Gaviotas Airport, Colombia
- Occupants: 17
- Passengers: 14
- Crew: 3
- Fatalities: 17
- Survivors: 0

On 29 July 1972, Avianca Flight 630, operating a scheduled domestic passenger flight within Colombia, flying from La Vanguardia Airport to Los Colonizadores Airport, with stopovers at Paz de Ariporo Airport and Santiago Pérez Quiroz Airport, collided with another Avianca flight, operating as Flight 626, also operating a scheduled domestic passenger flight within Colombia from La Vanguardia Airport to Las Gaviotas Airport, with stopovers in 3 different cities. The resulting mid-air collision killed all 21 occupants on board Flight 630 and all 17 occupants on board Flight 626, resulting in 38 total fatalities.

== Background ==
The aircraft operating Avianca Flight 630 was a 29 year old Douglas DC-3A, built in 1943 and registered as HK-107. It had the manufacturing number 11723. It was equipped with two Pratt & Whitney R-1830 Twin Wasp engines. On board flight 630 were 3 crew members, consisting of Captain Alvaro Gómez, First Officer Carlos López, and Flight Engineer Gustavo Amortequl.

The aircraft operating as Avianca Flight 626 was also a 29 year old Douglas DC-3A built in 1943, with the registration HK-1341 and manufacturing number 11716. It was also equipped with two Pratt & Whitney R-1830 Twin Wasp engines. There were also three crew members on board Flight 626, consisting of Captain Enrique Medina, First Officer Julio Barona, and Flight Engineer Martin Correal.

No flight attendants were on board either aircraft.

== Accident ==
Flight 630 took off from La Vanguardia Airport at 06:20 local time and began heading towards its first stopover, Paz de Ariporo Airport. Flight 626 took off two minutes after Flight 630, at 06:22 local time. The exact sequence is not known, but at some point, Flight 626 attempted to overtake Flight 630, but was unsuccessful, resulting in the collision at 06:53 local time, killing a total of 38 people on both planes.

== Investigation ==
Shortly after the mid-air collision, an investigation by Colombia's Civil Aeronautics Administration was launched. The investigation lasted an unknown amount of time, presumably until sometime in 1973 or 1974. Despite a lack of flight recorders and mountainous terrain, investigators were able to determine that the captain of Flight 626 had attempted to execute an overtaking maneuver of Flight 630, but failed to comply with regulatory standards published in the regulations manual published at the time. It was also determined that the fault of the accident was on flight 626, as at the time of the collision, flight 630 held the right of way, which according to the published regulatory standards at the time, bore flight 630 with no responsibility of a collision because they were following said regulatory standards.

Investigators were able to figure out that during the rest period provided to both crews, neither of them had used this period effectively, with the crew obtaining less than 2 hours of rest for each of their rest periods. This led to them possibly being fatigued, which could've effected their judgement during and leading up to the accident.

== See also ==
- List of mid-air collisions
- Avianca
- 1972 Lake Winnebago mid-air collision - Another mid-air collision that happened exactly one month before.
