= Flight 626 =

Flight 626 may refer to:

- Avianca Flight 626, involved in the 1972 Las Palomas mid-air collision on 29 July 1972
- Yemenia Flight 626, crashed on 30 June 2009
