= Avianca Flight 410 =

1988 aviation accident in Colombia

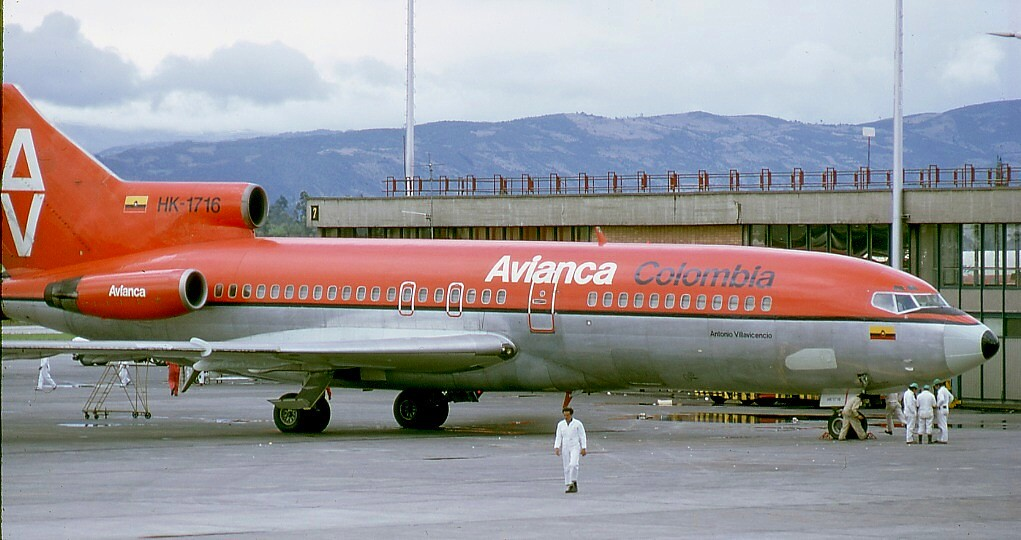
- HK-1716, the aircraft involved in the accident, seen in 1976 with a previous livery

Accident
- Date: 17 March 1988
- Summary: Controlled flight into terrain due to pilot error, lack of crew resource management
- Site: Cúcuta, Colombia; 8.0837°N 72.6925°W

Aircraft
- Aircraft type: Boeing 727-21
- Aircraft name: Antonio Villavicencio
- Operator: Avianca
- IATA flight No.: AV410
- ICAO flight No.: AVA410
- Call sign: AVIANCA 410
- Registration: HK-1716
- Flight origin: Camilo Daza Int'l Airport
- Destination: Rafael Núñez Int'l Airport
- Occupants: 143
- Passengers: 136
- Crew: 7
- Fatalities: 143
- Survivors: 0

Avianca Flight 410 was a Boeing 727-21 that crashed at 13:17 on 17 March 1988, near Cúcuta, Colombia, which occurred shortly after takeoff during a scheduled flight when it flew into a mountain. All 143 people on board were killed. It was the deadliest aviation accident to occur in Colombia until American Airlines Flight 965.

== Aircraft ==
The aircraft involved, manufactured in 1966, was a Boeing 727-21 owned and operated by Avianca. It was registered as HK-1716 serial number 18999. It had flown previously with Pan Am, originally registered as N321PA and named Clipper Koln-Bonn; it was sold on 20 September 1974, to Avianca. It had logged 43,848 hours of airframe time and was powered by three Pratt & Whitney JT8D-7A engines.

== Description ==
The plane took off from Cúcuta at around 13:17 from runway 33 bound for Cartagena. There was no further information from the plane until ground witnesses claimed that they saw a Boeing 727 flying too low. The plane contacted some trees and then, at 13:18, it struck the mountain head on. The 727 broke in half and disintegrated when the fuel exploded; the remains were scattered in a 60-meter (200 ft) radius. There were no survivors among the 7 crew and 136 passengers.

Rescue operations and commissions rushed to the crash site, which was impossible to reach due to nightfall and the resulting low visibility. Area residents provided light and helped the rescuers reach the top of the mountain, where the rest of the wreckage was. The next day, the remains were transported back to Cúcuta to be identified by their family members.

== Investigation ==
The official cause of the crash was a controlled flight into terrain at 6,343 feet. The investigation pointed to a number of probable causes, including a non-crew pilot in the cockpit, whose presence diverted the attention of the pilot and who interfered with the operation of the aircraft, and a lack of teamwork (crew resource management) between the pilot and co-pilot.

== Aftermath ==
The crash of Flight 410 was the deadliest aviation accident to occur in Colombia until 20 December 1995, when American Airlines Flight 965 crashed into a mountain near Buga, Valle del Cauca, killing 159 people. The cause was determined to be pilot error.

== See also ==
- Avianca Flight 011 - another plane of Avianca that crashed in Spain five years prior in similar circumstances
- Prinair Flight 277
