= Rafael Núñez International Airport =

Airport serving Cartagena, Colombia

Rafael Núñez International Airport Aeropuerto Internacional Rafael Núñez
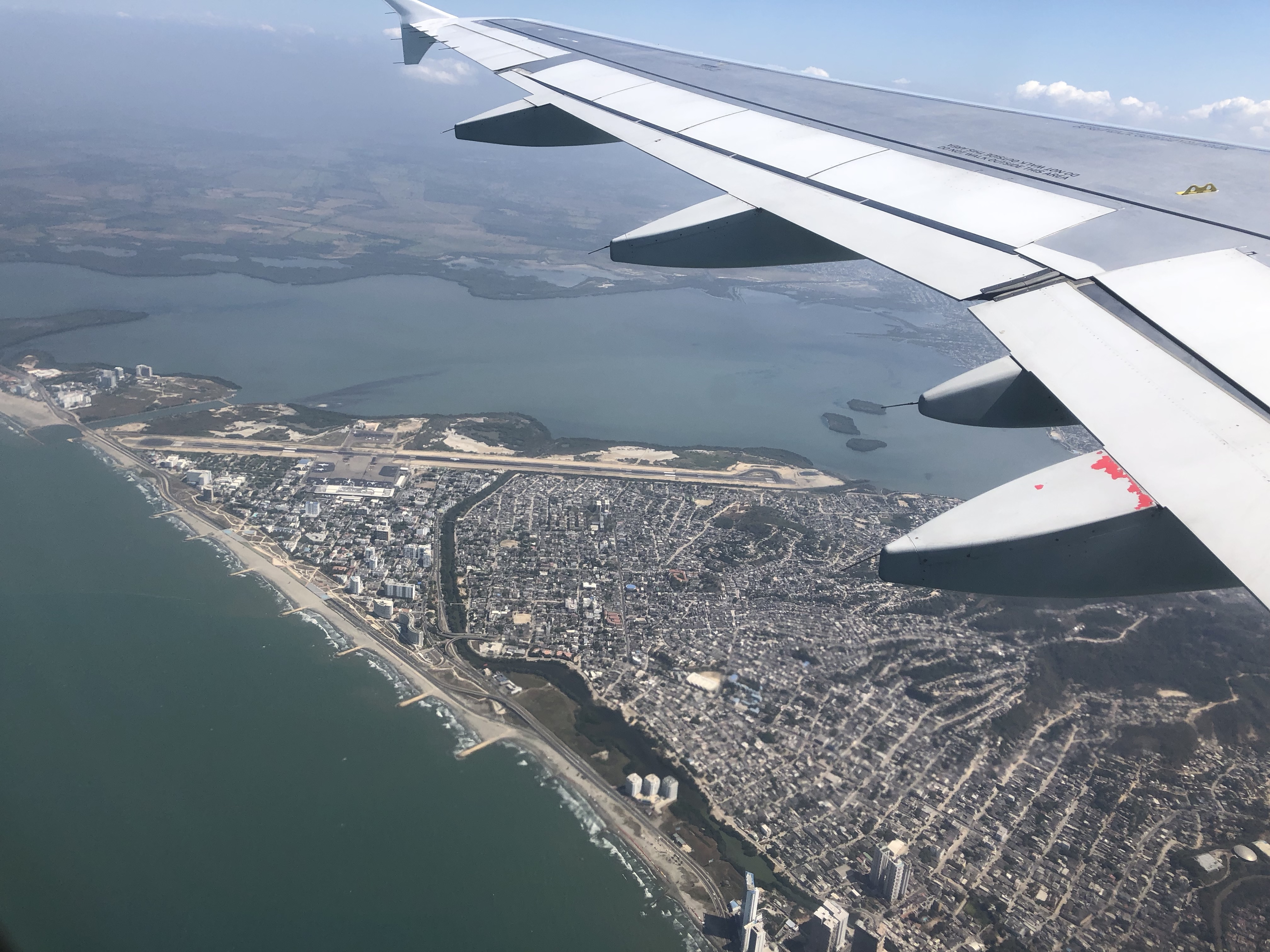
- IATA: CTG; ICAO: SKCG

Summary
- Airport type: Public
- Operator: OINAC
- Serves: Cartagena, Colombia
- Hub for: Avianca
- Elevation AMSL: 7 ft (2.1 m)
- Coordinates: 10°26′33″N 75°30′47″W
- Website: aeropuertocartagena.com.co

Map
- Location of airport in Colombia

Runways
Direction	Length		Surface
Direction	m	ft	Surface
01/19	2,600	8,530	Asphalt

Statistics (2018)
- Passenger Movement: 5,463,873
- Cargo Movement: 7,073 T
- Sources: GCM Google Maps

Rafael Núñez International Airport (IATA: CTG, ICAO: SKCG) is an international airport serving the Caribbean port city of Cartagena, Colombia. It is the largest airport in the country's northern Caribbean region in terms of passenger movement. It is located between the Caribbean coast and the Ciénaga de la Virgen marsh, in the center of Crespo, a neighborhood in northern Cartagena. It is named after Cartagena native Rafael Núñez (1825–1894), the former Colombian president who wrote the verses to the National Anthem of Colombia.

Airlines including Air Panama, Air Transat, American Airlines, Avianca, Copa Airlines, EasyFly, JetBlue, LATAM Colombia, LATAM Perú and Wingo have or had international flights from this airport to various cities in North, Central and South America. KLM and Edelweiss Air have flights to Amsterdam and Zurich by way of Bogotá (the airlines do not own rights to transport passengers solely between Cartagena and Bogota).

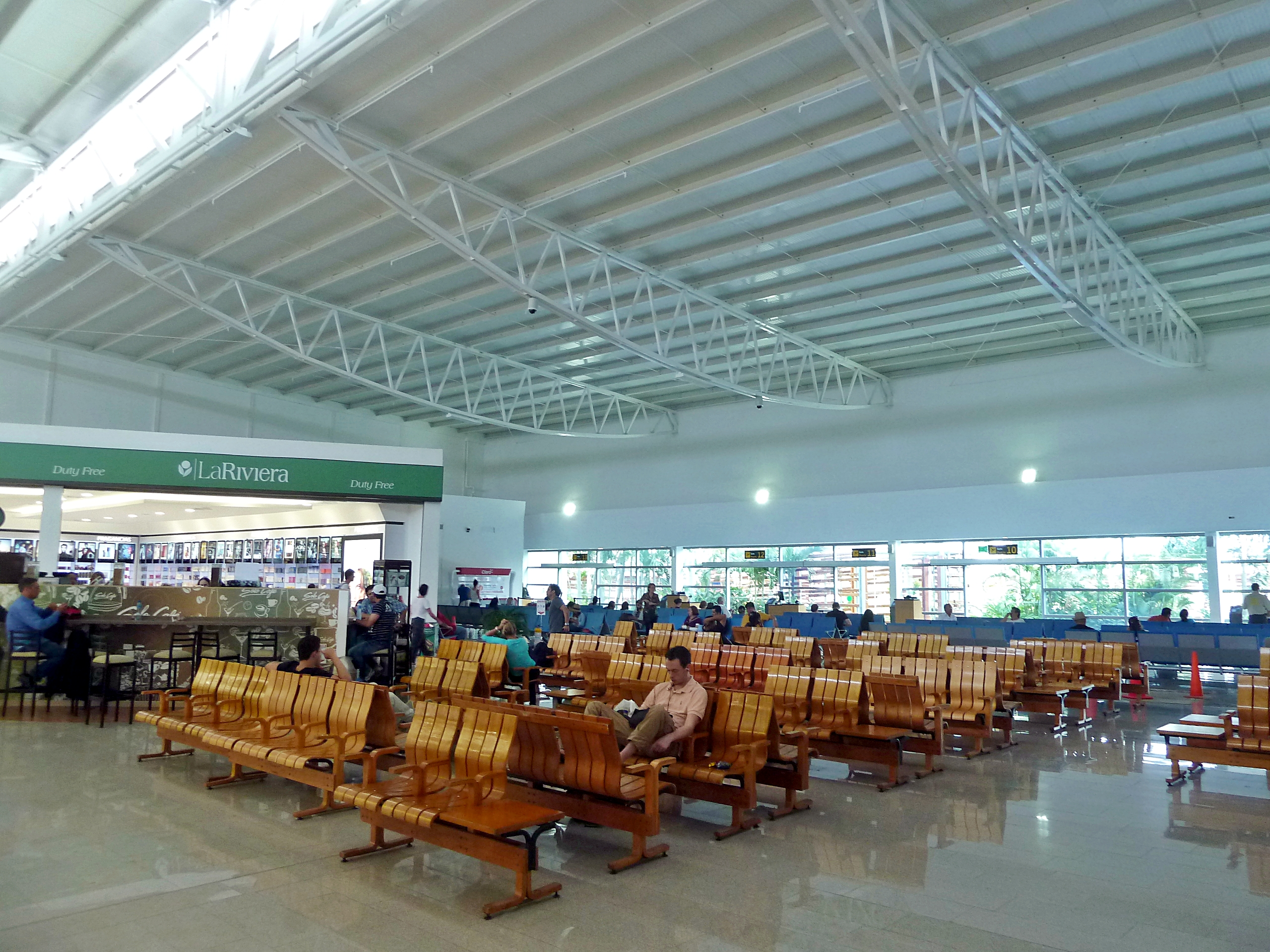
The airport's international terminal

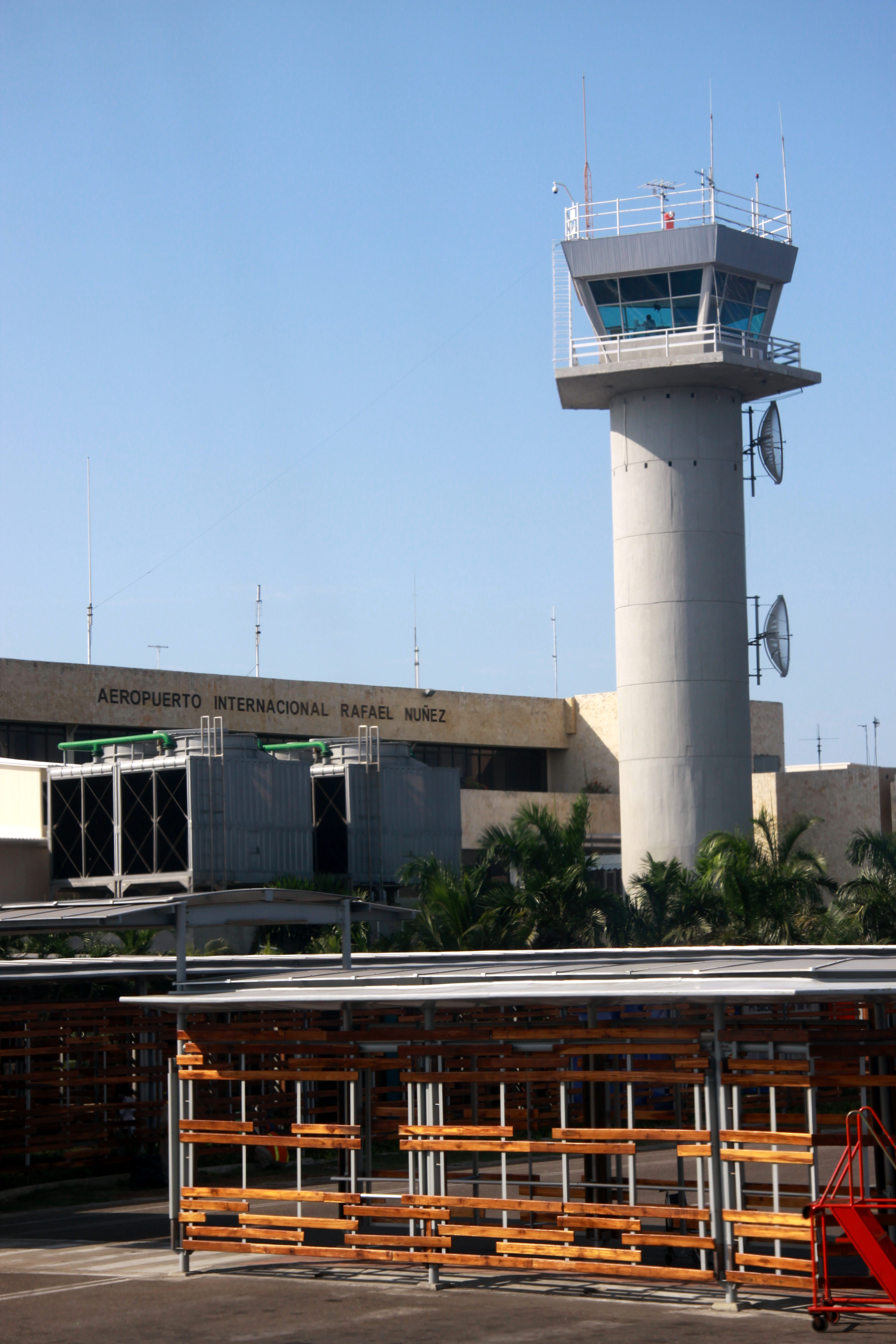
Control tower

== Airlines and destinations ==
=== Passenger ===
The following airlines operate regular scheduled and charter flights at the airport.

Airlines	Destinations
Aeroméxico	Mexico City–Benito Juárez
Aerolíneas Argentinas	Buenos Aires–Aeroparque (begins 1 January 2027)
Air Canada	Seasonal: Montréal–Trudeau, Toronto–Pearson
Air Transat	Montréal–Trudeau, Toronto–Pearson
American Airlines	Miami
Arajet	Punta Cana, Santo Domingo–Las Américas
Avianca	Bogotá, Bucaramanga, Cali, Medellín–JMC, Pereira; Seasonal: Miami, New York–JFK, Santiago de Chile
Avianca Costa Rica	San José (CR)
Clic	Seasonal: Bucaramanga (begins 26 December 2026), Cúcuta (begins 26 December 2026), Ibagué (begins 18 December 2026), Medellín–Olaya Herrera (begins 18 December 2026), Pereira (begins 18 December 2026)
Copa Airlines	Panama City–Tocumen
Delta Air Lines	Atlanta
Edelweiss Air	Seasonal: Bogotá, Zurich
Frontier Airlines	Orlando (begins 19 December 2026)
JetBlue	Fort Lauderdale, New York–JFK
JetSmart Colombia	Bogotá, Cali, Cúcuta, Medellín–JMC, Pereira
JetSmart Perú	Lima
KLM	Amsterdam, Bogotá
LATAM Colombia	Bogotá, Cali, San Andrés Island
LATAM Perú	Lima
Neos	Seasonal: Milan–Malpensa
United Airlines	Houston–Intercontinental, Washington–Dulles (both begin 17 December 2026)
Viva	Mexico City–Felipe Ángeles
Wingo	Bogota, Cali, Bucaramanga, Medellín–JMC, Panama City–Balboa, San Andrés Island
World2Fly	Madrid

=== Cargo ===
Airlines	Destinations
AerCaribe	Bogotá

Note:

- ^{1}: Edelweiss Air's flight is from Bogotá to Zurich via Cartagena. However, the airline does not have traffic rights to transport passengers solely between Bogotá and Cartagena.
- ^{2}: KLM's flight is from Bogotá to Amsterdam via Cartagena. However, the airline does not have traffic rights to transport passengers solely between Bogotá and Cartagena.

== Statistics ==
Busiest international routes (roundtrip) out of Rafael Núñez International Airport (2015)
Rank	City	Passengers	% Change	Airlines
1	Panama City, Panama	140,388	▼1.70%	Copa Airlines, Copa Airlines Colombia
2	(United States) Fort Lauderdale, USA	140,266	▲37.64%	JetBlue, Spirit Airlines
3	(United States) New York–Kennedy, USA	91,554	▲93.01%	Avianca, JetBlue
4	Miami, United States	71,116	▲8.81%	American Airlines, Avianca

Busiest domestic routes (roundtrip) out of Rafael Núñez International Airport (2015)
Rank	City	Passengers	% Change	Airlines
1	(Colombia) Bogota	2,390,508	▲12.58%	Avianca, Copa Airlines Colombia, LATAM Colombia, Viva Colombia
2	(Colombia) Medellin, Antioquia	614,520	▲8.98%	Aerolínea de Antioquia, Avianca, LATAM, Viva Colombia
3	(Colombia) Cali, Valle del Cauca	172,113	▲37.56%	Avianca, Viva Colombia
4	(Colombia) San Andrés	101,587	▲55.02%	Copa Airlines Colombia, Viva Colombia
5	(Colombia) Pereira, Risaralda	93,842	▼6.64%	Avianca, Viva Colombia
6	(Colombia) Bucaramanga, Santander	27,646	▲11.56%	EasyFly, Viva Colombia.

== Capacity and structure ==
- The airport is connected with 3 bays accessible from the runway, the aircraft taxi down the runway 1000 meters to stop turning over 300 meters and take-off position. The track is 60 meters wide and 2,600 m long at 0 meters above sea level provides sufficient capacity for modern transatlantic aircraft operations without problems.
- The airport has the capacity to house 11 aircraft and open skies for charter operations.
- Currently, OINAC S.A. has a 10 years contract to administer and expand the airport since March 1st 2024

== See also ==
- Transport in Colombia
- List of airports in Colombia

== Accidents and incidents ==
- On January 11, 1995, Intercontinental de Aviación Flight 256 crashed on approach to the airport due to instrument failures and pilot errors leading to a CFIT.
