= Saravena =

- Municipality and town
- Flag Coat of arms

- Location of the municipality and town of Saravena in the Arauca Department of Colombia
- Coordinates: 6°57′20″N 71°52′20″W
- Country: Colombia
- Department: Arauca Department

Area
  - Municipality and town: 945.1 km^{2} (364.9 sq mi)
  - Urban: 10.03 km^{2} (3.87 sq mi)
- Elevation: 220 m (730 ft)

Population (2018 census)
  - Municipality and town: 55,554
  - Density: 58.78/km^{2} (152.2/sq mi)
  - Urban: 42,415
  - Urban density: 4,229/km^{2} (10,950/sq mi)
- Time zone: UTC-5 (Colombia Standard Time)
- Climate: Am

Saravena is a city and municipality in Arauca Department, Colombia. It is located 6 kilometres (3.7 mi) south of Colombia's border with Venezuela. The municipality, with a population of 55,554, has had FARC and ELN activity as well as a Colombian military presence near the Venezuelan border.

It is served by Los Colonizadores Airport.

== Climate ==
Saravena has a tropical monsoon climate (Köppen Am) with moderate to little rainfall from December to March to and heavy to very heavy rainfall from April to November.

Climate data for Saravena, elevation 148 m (486 ft), (1981–2010)
Month	Jan	Feb	Mar	Apr	May	Jun	Jul	Aug	Sep	Oct	Nov	Dec	Year
Mean daily maximum °C (°F)	30.6 (87.1)	31.4 (88.5)	31.5 (88.7)	30.8 (87.4)	30.6 (87.1)	29.6 (85.3)	29.6 (85.3)	30.0 (86.0)	30.7 (87.3)	31.1 (88.0)	30.9 (87.6)	30.6 (87.1)	30.6 (87.1)
Daily mean °C (°F)	25.5 (77.9)	26.2 (79.2)	26.4 (79.5)	26.0 (78.8)	25.6 (78.1)	24.9 (76.8)	24.9 (76.8)	25.1 (77.2)	25.5 (77.9)	25.7 (78.3)	25.7 (78.3)	25.4 (77.7)	25.5 (77.9)
Mean daily minimum °C (°F)	20.5 (68.9)	21.2 (70.2)	21.4 (70.5)	21.6 (70.9)	21.3 (70.3)	20.8 (69.4)	20.6 (69.1)	20.4 (68.7)	20.5 (68.9)	20.7 (69.3)	20.6 (69.1)	20.6 (69.1)	20.8 (69.4)
Average precipitation mm (inches)	44.4 (1.75)	79.8 (3.14)	109.2 (4.30)	253.4 (9.98)	397.3 (15.64)	420.6 (16.56)	361.2 (14.22)	335.8 (13.22)	297.6 (11.72)	338.5 (13.33)	200.6 (7.90)	115.6 (4.55)	2,941.7 (115.81)
Average precipitation days (≥ 1.0 mm)	6	8	11	17	20	23	23	21	18	18	15	10	182
Average relative humidity (%)	79	79	79	83	85	87	86	86	85	84	83	83	84
Mean monthly sunshine hours	161.2	118.6	89.9	81.0	99.2	96.0	117.8	130.2	144.0	155.0	150.0	151.9	1,494.8
Mean daily sunshine hours	5.2	4.2	2.9	2.7	3.2	3.2	3.8	4.2	4.8	5.0	5.0	4.9	4.1
Source: Instituto de Hidrologia Meteorologia y Estudios Ambientales
