= El Dorado International Airport =

International airport serving Bogotá, Colombia

El Dorado International Airport Aeropuerto Internacional El Dorado

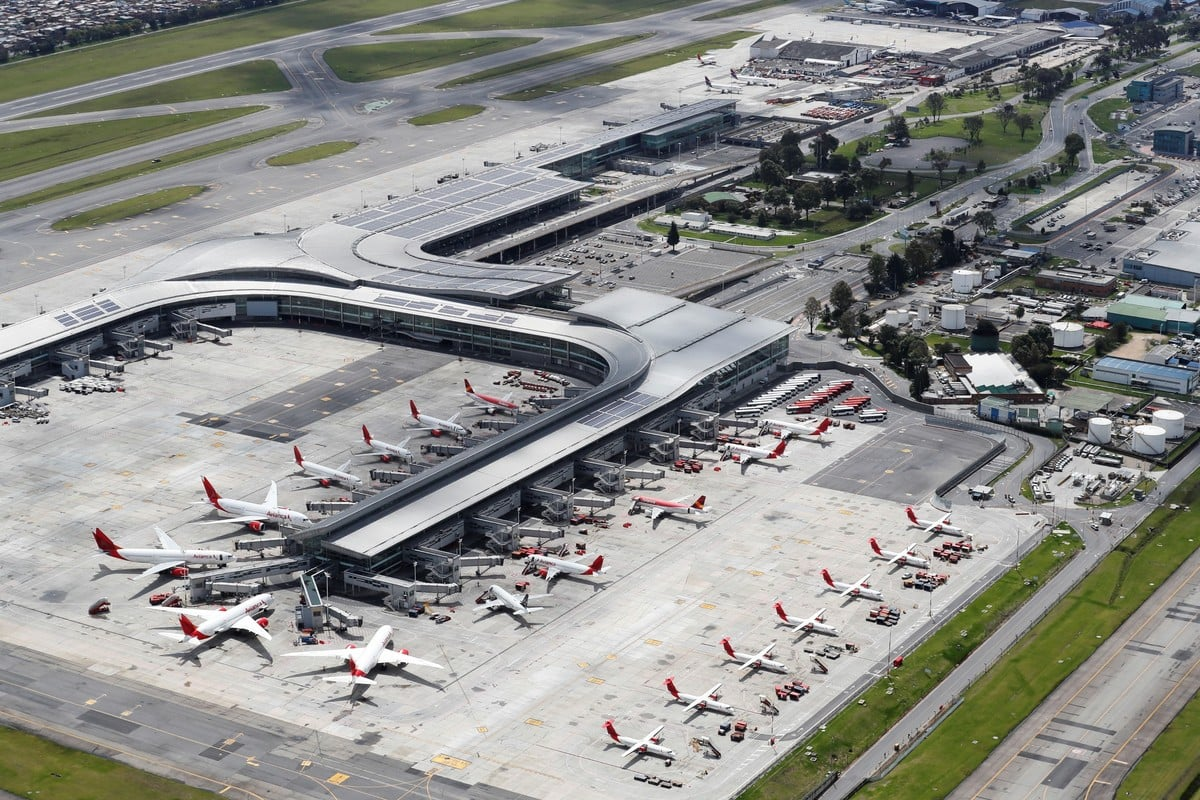
- Aerial view of El Dorado International Airport a.k.a. The Hub of the Americas
- IATA: BOG; ICAO: SKBO; WMO: 80222

Summary
- Airport type: Public / Military
- Operator: OPAIN S.A.
- Serves: Bogotá
- Location: Fontibón
- Opened: 10 December 1959; 66 years ago
- Hub for: Aerosucre; Avianca; Avianca Cargo; Avianca Express; Copa Airlines Colombia; LATAM Airlines Colombia; LATAM Cargo Colombia; SATENA
- Operating base for: AerCaribe; Central Charter de Colombia; Clic Air; Helicol; SADELCA; SAEP; Wingo
- Elevation AMSL: 2,548 m (8,360 ft)
- Coordinates: 04°42′05″N 74°08′49″W
- Website: www.eldorado.aero

Map
- Location of airport in Colombia

Runways
Direction	Length		Surface
Direction	m	ft	Surface
14L/32R	3,800	12,467	Asphalt
14R/32L	3,800	12,467	Asphalt

Statistics (2024)
- Aircraft operations: 360,589
- Passengers: 45,802,360
- Cargo tonnage: 809,021 TM

El Dorado International Airport (IATA: BOG, ICAO: SKBO) is an international airport serving Bogotá, the capital of Colombia, and its surrounding areas. The airport is located mostly in the Fontibón district of Bogotá, although it partially extends into the Engativá district and through the municipality of Funza in the Western Savanna Province of the Cundinamarca Department. It is the second busiest airport in Latin America, after São Paulo - Guarulhos International Airport . With 760,000 metric tons of cargo passing through in 2022, it is also Iberoamerica's most important cargo hub. El Dorado is also by far the busiest and most important airport in Colombia, accounting for just under half (49%) of the country's air traffic. The facility covers 1,700 acres (690 hectares) and contains two 3,800-metre (12,500 ft) long runways. El Dorado has direct international flights to North America, South America, Central America, the Caribbean, Europe, and the Middle East.

Strategically located between the Americas, it is by far the most well-connected airport in Latin America and the Caribbean, and is the 13th most connected international megahub in the world as of 2026. Its location helps to facilitate both cargo and passengers connections between both continents and beyond. For this reason, it is globally-known as The Hub of the Americas. It is the most important hub for the Colombian flag carrier Avianca and its subsidiaries Avianca Express and Avianca Cargo. It is also a base for LATAM Colombia, Copa Airlines Colombia, Satena, and a number of other airlines. It is owned by the Government of Colombia and operated by Operadora Aeroportuaria Internacional (OPAIN), a consortium composed of Colombian construction and engineering firms, and the Swiss company Flughafen Zürich AG, the company that operates Zurich Airport.

El Dorado has consistently been ranked since 2016 by World Airport Awards and Skytrax as among the best airports in the world. It was ranked as the best airport in South America by World Airport Awards and the best airport in Latin America overall by Skytrax with a four-star certification by Skytrax in 2022. It was also ranked as having the best staff in South America, placed 35th in Skytrax's World's Top 100 Airports, and ranked the 2nd cleanest airport in Latin America by Skytrax in 2023.

== History ==
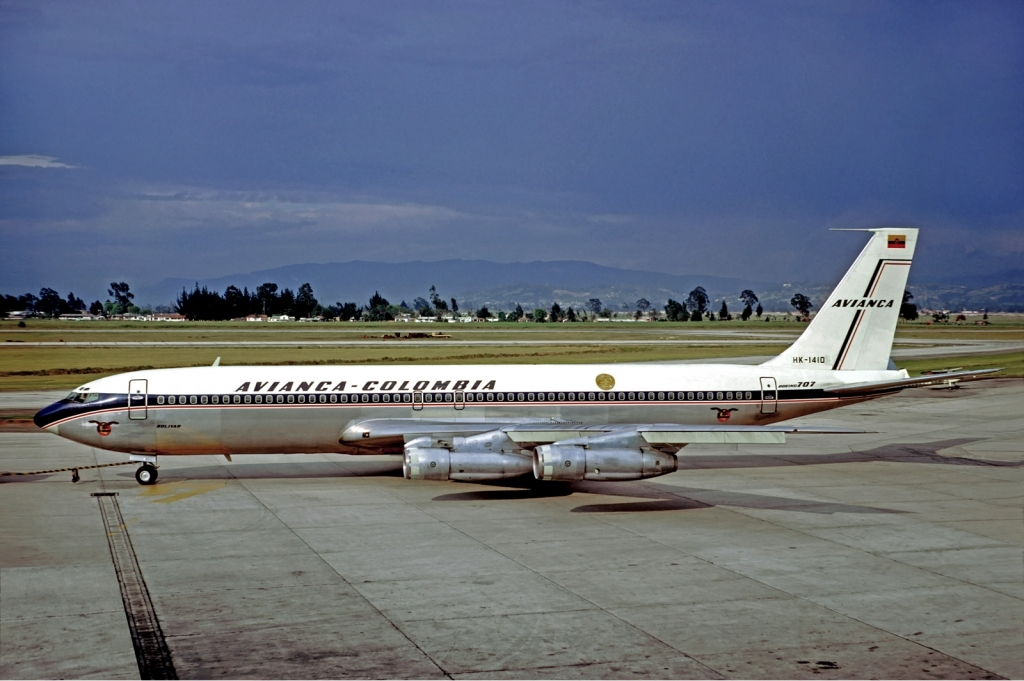
An Avianca B707-359B (HK-1410) at El Dorado International Airport in 1972.

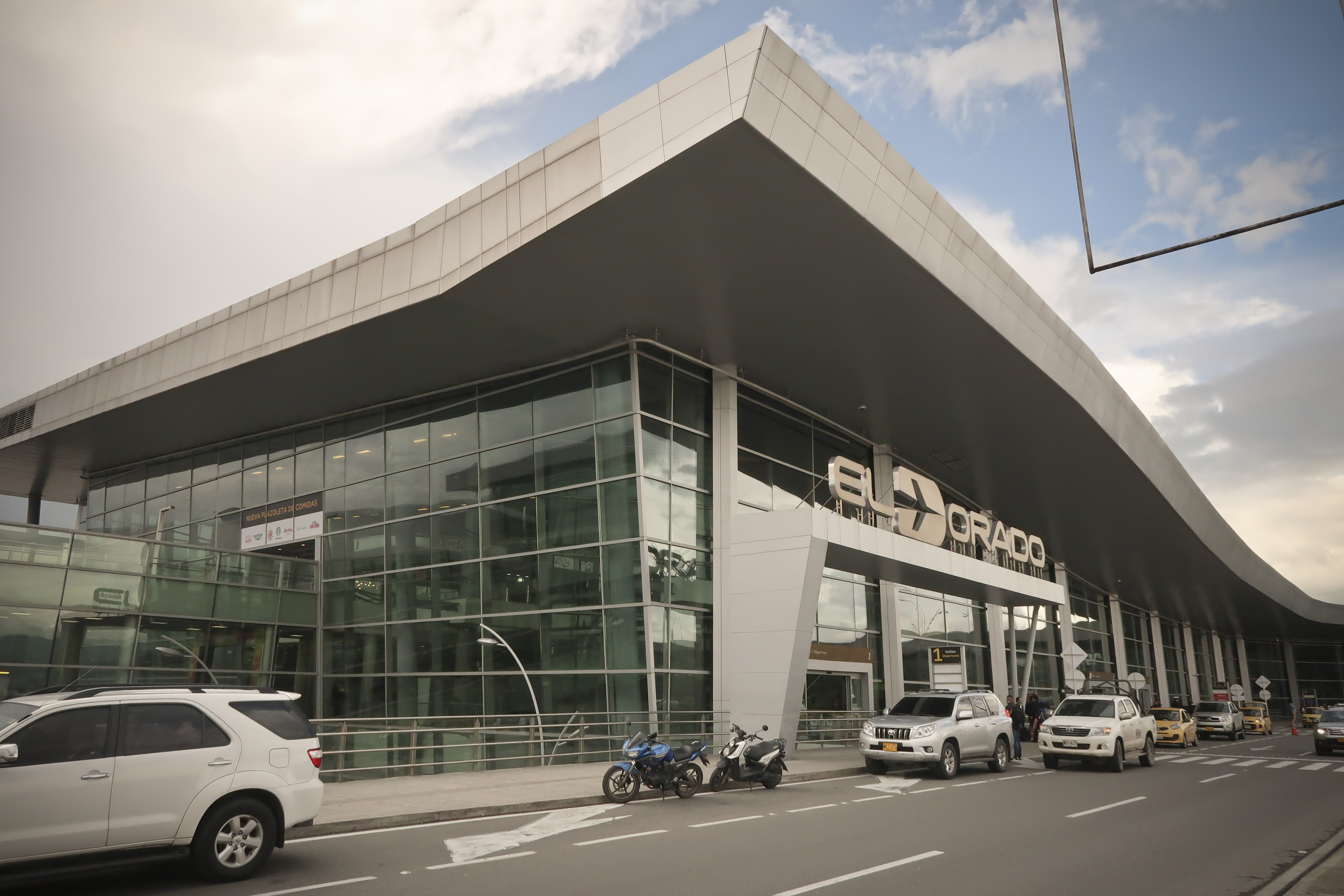
Main entrance for domestic departures at El Dorado International Airport

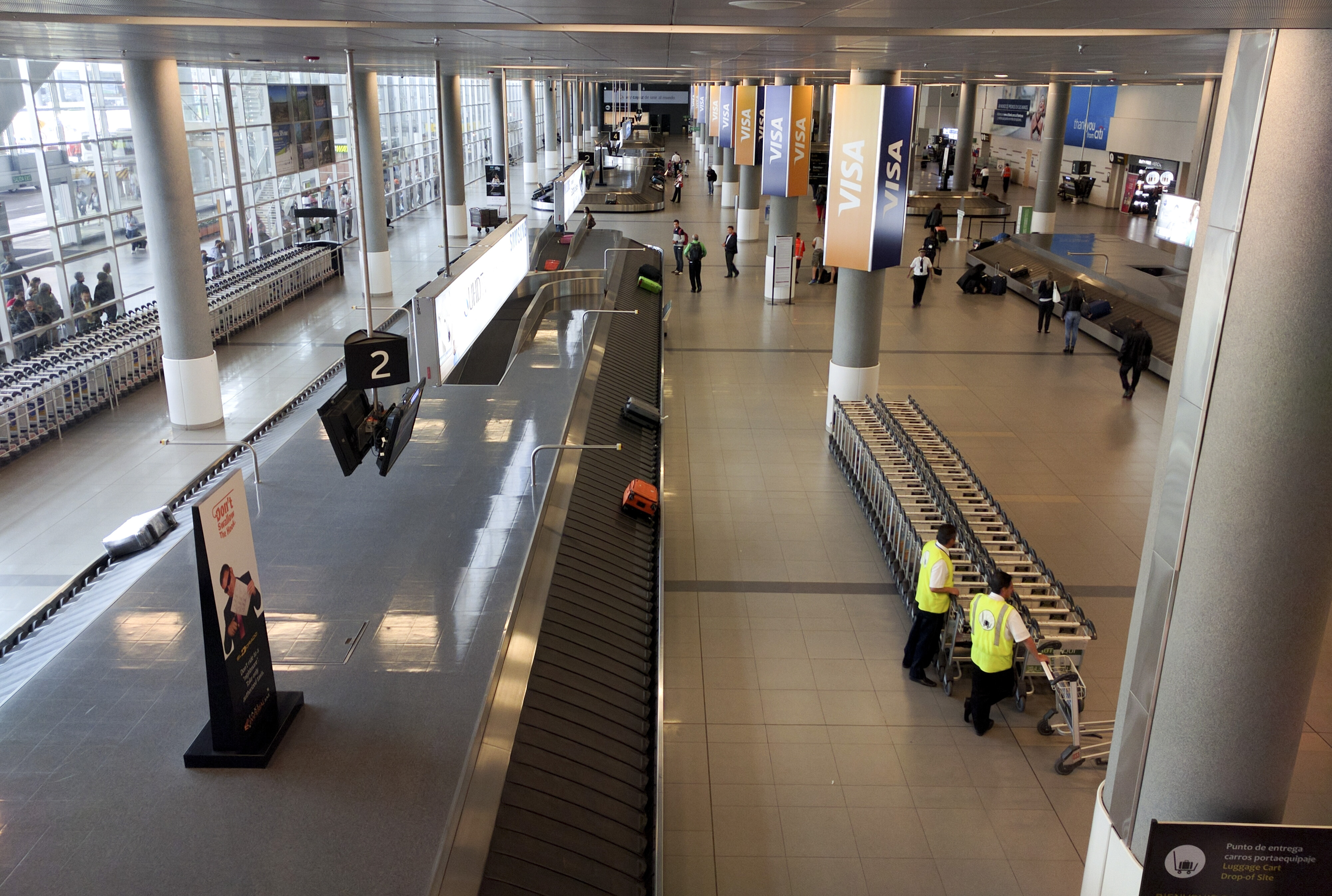
Baggage claim hall at Bogota El Dorado Airport

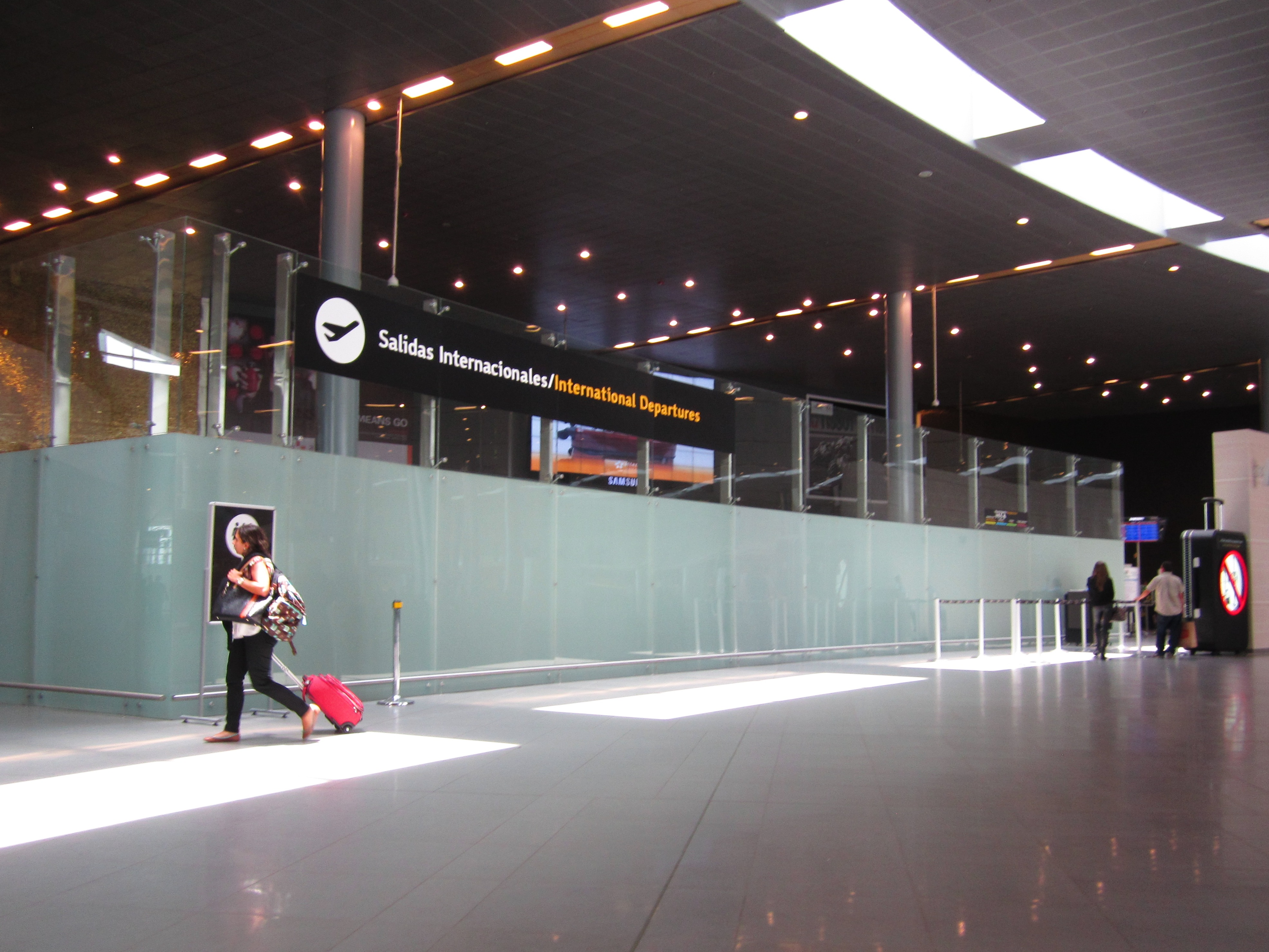
International Departures gate in the Terminal 1

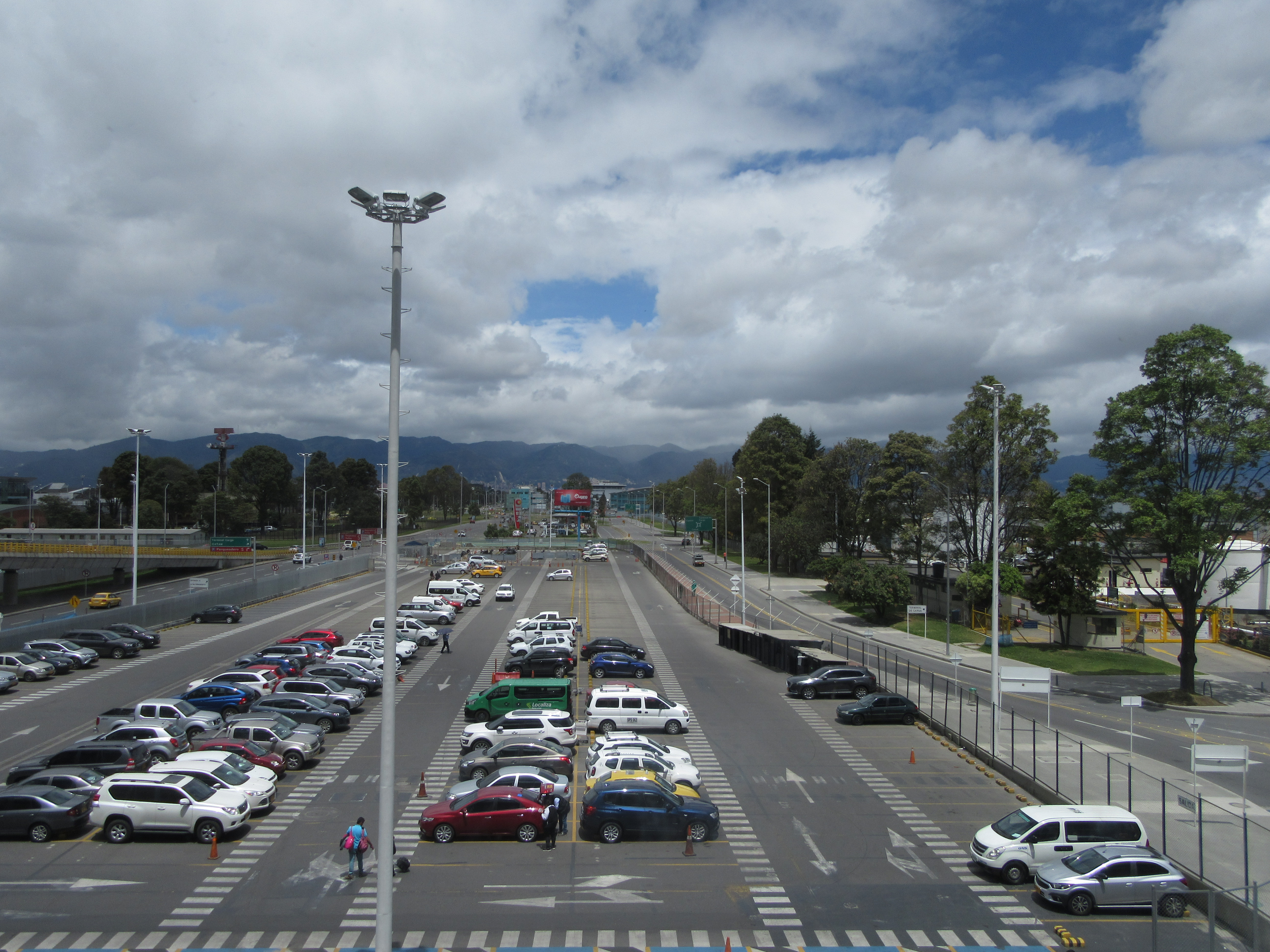
The view outside of the airport in 2018

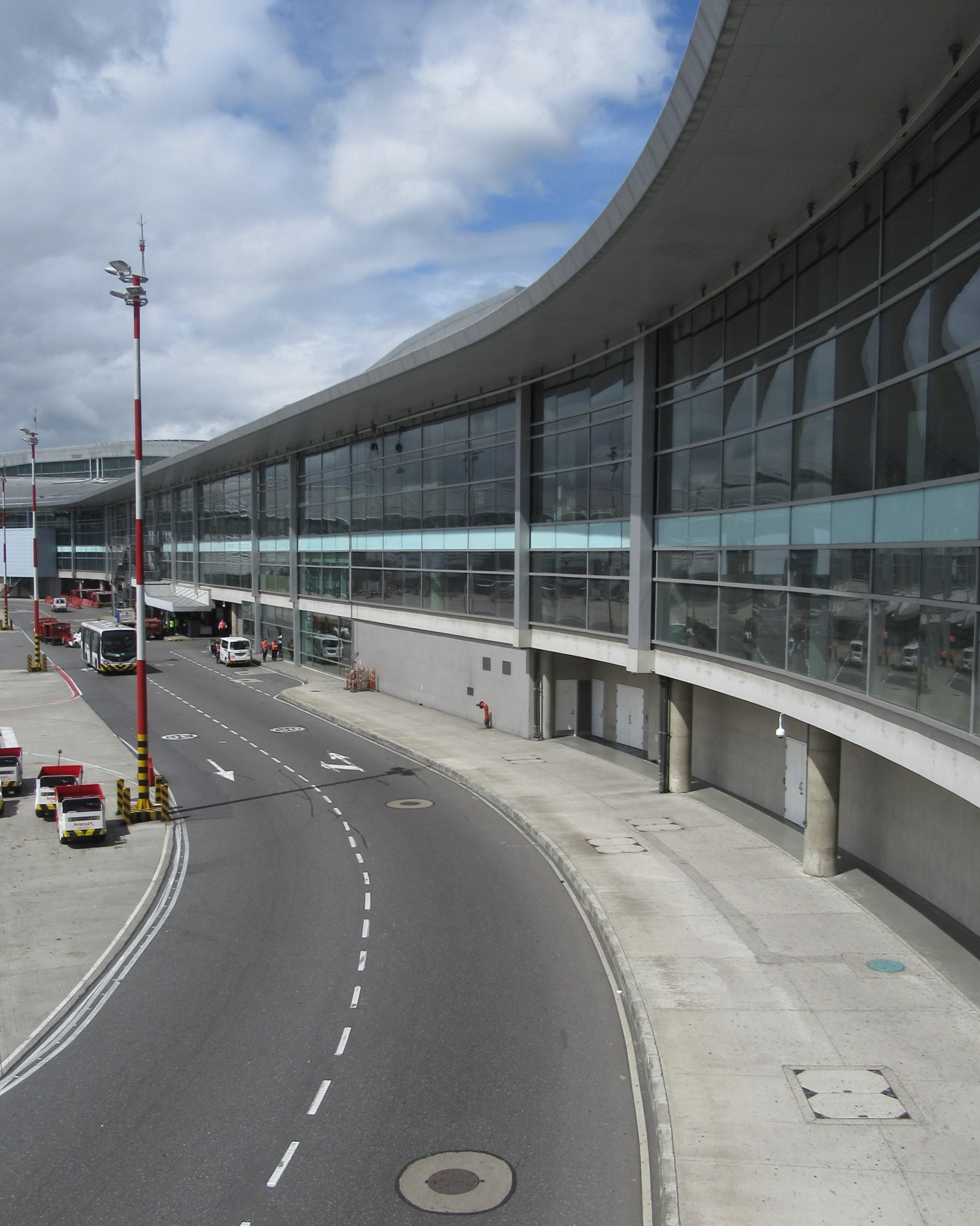
Windows on the main platform

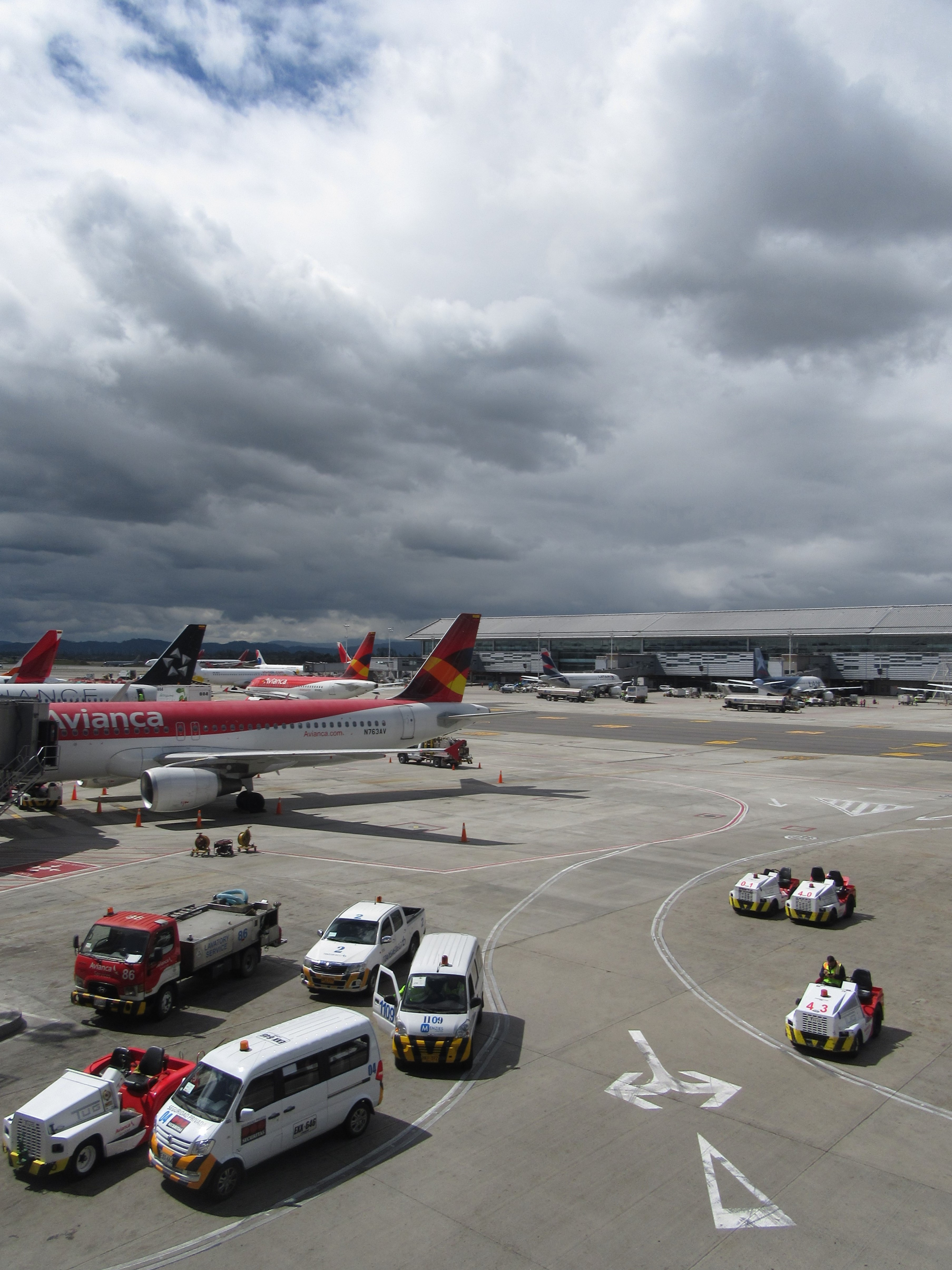
Vehicles on the apron

The airport was designed and built during the government of General Gustavo Rojas Pinilla as part of his campaign to modernize the country. Construction began in 1955 and entered in service by December 1959, replacing the aging Techo International Airport, which had been the city's main airport since 1930.

Before its inauguration, Soledad International Airport in Barranquilla was the nation's air hub. It was relegated to secondary importance in the country when El Dorado Airport opened.

The Sociedad de Mejoras y Ornato de Bogotá was in charge of the external decoration of the airport. On 29 September, after a meeting of the Board of Directors of project, the inauguration date was set for 10 December 1959.

Before its completion on 28 October 1959, the airports's manager, René Van Meerbeke, recommended that the airport's name be placed in the central part of the building's façade; however, the name was the subject of much reflection: a short, easy-to-pronounce, terrigenous name was sought that would recall the aboriginal culture that occupied the Bogotá Savannah. Thus, El Dorado was chosen as the most appropriate name for the new terminal. After much discussion among academics led by Professor Luis López de Mesa, Father Félix Restrepo and Alberto Miramón, the name of the airport was determined by decree, written without spaces, forming a single word.

On 10 December 1959, the El Dorado International Airport was inaugurated with a spectacular aeronautical exhibition beginning on 6 December which included 16 airplanes, 12 jet-propelled and four additional B-26s that caused the greatest impression on the public.

In the archives of the firm of architects and engineers Cuéllar, Serrano, Gómez y Cía., which participated in the construction of the airport, and of the Sociedad de Mejoras y Ornato, there is no record of the company that manufactured the Eldorado sign; neither is the weight of the eight letters known, since they did not need maintenance since they were installed.

The airport reached a milestone in 1973 with over three million passengers and nearly 5 million units of luggage processed. Plans began for a second runway at El Dorado with concerns that the explosive growth would lead to over congestion in the future.

In 1990, the Special Administrative Unit of Civil Aeronautics (Aerocivil) moved to the airport.

In 1998, the airport's second runway was inaugurated, which has received much disagreement from the residents of the nearby area of Fontibón, due to the incessant air operations during the day and night.

In 2012, in accordance with Law 75 of 1989, which honors the memory of Luis Carlos Galán, Law 1529 of 2012 made official the name change from "El Dorado International Airport" to "Luis Carlos Galán Sarmiento El Dorado International Airport", including the space between "El" and "Dorado", and the name of the politician from Bumán. This name change generated a strong controversy, especially because of the costs associated with it, and because of the non-existent relationship between Galán and the airport.

At the end of 2017, all the works corresponding to El Dorado International Airport and the new Terminal 1 were fully handed over. The Terminal 1 grew from 173,000 to 235,000 m^{2} (square meters), with the potential to serve up to 43 million people per year.

=== Avianca hub ===
Avianca officially opened a hub in Bogotá in December 1998. The carrier flies to 52 destinations from Bogota as of August 2023.

It is now one of two hubs operated by the carrier, the other being Avianca El Salvador's hub at El Salvador International Airport.

=== Puente Aéreo ===
In 1981, Avianca undertook the construction of the Puente Aéreo Terminal inaugurated by President Julio César Turbay Ayala.

The name Puente Aéreo means Air Bridge in English. Avianca's original purpose for the terminal was for flights serving Cali, Medellín, Miami and New York. During the first years of operation and until 2005 Avianca gradually moved all of its domestic operations to the Puente Aéreo and moved the Miami and New York operations to the main terminal.

This allowed them to streamline their operations by using space previously assigned to customs and immigration for passenger gates and lounges. The culmination of this process came in 2006 when the airline undertook extensive renovations on the building. However, the airline was mindful of the impending and current renovations of El Dorado. One possible plan will be demolishing the Puente Aéreo Terminal, Main terminal and old cargo buildings which will be replaced with a new mega terminal. Many of the renovations made to the terminal in 2006 were obviously temporary and designed to be cheap but effective. For example, the walkways for the new gates are simply floor tiles placed over the old tarmac and the structure is made of aluminum with plastic sheets instead of glass windows. Passengers must cross the lanes used by buses, baggage carts and other vehicles in order to reach the aircraft. Once at the gate travellers must climb stairs to access the plane, the norm in the 1950s and 1960s but has for many years been surpassed by jetways.

In February 2008, Avianca opened a pioneer store called Avianca store which sells different products including: toy airplanes, hats, umbrellas, clothing, stuffed toys, pens, mugs and other such products, all embossed with the company logo. The store was an instant success and the airline expanded the concept to various other cities in Colombia.

On 28 April 2018, Avianca moved its entire domestic operation to Terminal 1 and local carriers Satena and EasyFly started operating from Puente Aéreo or Terminal 2.

=== CATAM military airport ===
On 3 September 1932 it was launched the first Military Transport Service in Colombia, when a Junkers F-13 carried Colonel Luis Acevedo and his party to Leticia. Colonel Acevedo also served as Colombia's General Director of aviation. Although the military air transport infrastructure was not formed yet, that mission was accomplished during the conflict with Peru in a rudimentary but effective way, with aircraft like the Junkers W 34, Ju 52 and BT-32 Condor.

In 1954 he created a "Liaison Squadron" operating under direct orders of the President of the Republic, at the time, Gen. Gustavo Rojas Pinilla. The Squadron was located in the Airport of Techo, the first airport of Bogotá. Its success led to the creation of a Military Airlift Group, which reached the category of Transportation Base in 1959. By then El Dorado International Airport was finished, so the Colombian Air Force ordered the transfer of the Unit to an area adjacent to the new Airport of El Dorado, using the civil airport facilities, while finishing the construction of a new base. The base was baptized as Comando Aéreo de Transporte Militar (Military Transportation Air Command) or CATAM. The base was inaugurated on 28 May 1963.

The base acquired the status of Operations and Logistics Support Center by FAC Directive No. 4429 of 8 July 1963, starting operations on 25 October. In 1968 the first two Hercules C-130B, with Colombian airplane military numbers FAC-1001 and FAC-1002, were delivered to this base. These aircraft, clearly designed for war missions and troop and materials transport, were able to use short and unpaved runways used in military operations through the country, fulfilling the needs of Colombian Air Force.

In 1977, the Military Transport Aviation Command was named after the Colombian aviation pioneer, Honorary Brigadier General Camilo Daza Alvarez. In order to expand its capacity for troop and cargo transportation in support of surface forces, in their fight against subversion and drug trafficking, the Air Force acquired new C-130 Hercules aircraft that been used for security purposes but also for humanitarian assistance. Between 1990 and 1991 the base received from the U.S. government six C-130B aircraft to support operations to combat drug trafficking and guerrillas.

In 1996 the base opened new ground accesses through an area devoted to the Military Transport Aviation Command. The narrow street that impeded the entrance and exit of vehicles was replaced by a dual carriageway and a tunnel that allows access to vehicular traffic passing below the airplane access ramp to runway number 2 of El Dorado International Airport. The parking lot was also enlarged to serve up to 260 vehicles. The base hosts the Colombian Air Force Museum, which has planes in display that represent the various types used in service during the 85 years history of the force.

In 2003 NVG equipment for night vision air operations was installed in Hercules C-130 and CN-235 Nurtanio airplanes. This increased the operational and support capacity of the base given to ground Army force, by allowing transportation, parachuting and aeromedical evacuation on combat runways lacking illumination. In this way Colombian Air Force almost doubled its operating capacity at this base, since it works 24 hours a day.

== Terminals and facilities ==
The main passenger terminal is known as Terminal 1 (T1). The T1 building is shaped like a lowercase "h" and is divided into two piers or concourses: the international one to the north side and the domestic pier/concourse on the south side. Terminal 1 has four airline lounges (operated by LATAM, Avianca, and Copa), in addition to the El Dorado Lounge by Mastercard in the international concourse and one airline lounge (operated by Avianca) in the domestic concourse. It also offers a variety of food options, both on the air and land side, and several retail stores and cafés in the duty-free area. There are also car rental facilities, ticket counters, ATMs, telephones, restrooms, luggage storage space and even a small casino. The terminal has complimentary Wi-Fi service.

T1 has several check-in counter areas, check-in kiosks and expanded immigration lanes compared to the previous terminal. "Express lanes" were added for holders of biometric passports and Global Entry Membership. The new terminal has moving walkways, escalators and elevators to guarantee universal access and faster connections. The new terminal contains 32 gates: 10 for international flights and 22 for domestic flights, five of which are remote stands.

The "Puente Aéreo" is currently Terminal 2 (T2). It had previously been Avianca's exclusive terminal for domestic flights. On 29 April 2018, the airline moved the remainder of its domestic operation from T2 to T1, which in turn meant the switch from T1 to T2 of EasyFly and Satena, who are currently the sole operators at the terminal. Terminal 2 contains a revamped food plaza, some retail stores, and ATMs.

The Special Administrative Unit of Civil Aeronautics (Aerocivil) is located in the new Aerocivil Building, located on the airport property. Previously it was located on the fourth floor of the main terminal building.

Due to the high demand for passengers, the need has become apparent to build a new, more modern airport with a larger capacity for both commercial and cargo flights. The process began with the creation of the new terminal. On 7 February 2007, the airport gave a concession to the consortium Opain. The national government accepted the proposal with Opain (airport operating company), to demolish the airport on 14 March 2008, after having given its concession. Initially the grant provided for the modernization of existing buildings and the construction of some additional buildings connected to the main terminal, but during the upgrading works (see below, Milestone 1), structural defects were discovered, which do not compromise the integrity of the building today. Opain from the beginning had proposed to demolish the aging terminal and had even submitted a new design to replace it, but the government had strongly opposed it due to pressing budget and legal issues (because it would be a big change to the terms of the concession, which could make Opain as well as other competitors who participated in the tender submitted claims), although many sectors of public opinion agreed with Opain. After the structural problems were discovered, the government agreed to the demolition of the airport and compensation for the renovations that Opain had already been hired to perform (Milestone 1). For the airport to handle 16 million passengers annually and 1.5 million tons of cargo, Opain plans to move the cargo terminal to allow the expansion of the passenger terminal and ensure access for at least an additional avenue to 26th Street.

On 19 September 2007, the implementation of Milestone 1 of the plan for modernization and expansion of the airport began. This consists of expanding the current Central Arrivals Hall of the terminal and installation of the CUTE system at the terminal. This was completed in March 2008. Additionally, the construction of the new cargo terminal, a new building for the office of civil aviation, a new fire station, an administrative center and quarantine were completed in September 2009.

The third milestone of the project began in late November 2009. Terminal 2 (Today's T1), located on the north side of the old terminal, will handle all international passengers and its construction was set for 2012. The old building of Terminal 1 will handle only national passengers, except for Avianca's which will continue being served on Terminal Puente Aereo. Soon after Terminal 2 began its operation, the old Terminal 1 building was to be demolished in order to build a new terminal for domestic passengers. On 17 October, the new Terminal 2 was inaugurated and on the 19th, every international operation was moved from Terminal 1 to Terminal 2. The new El Dorado International Airport, designed by Zyscovich Architects, was the largest infrastructure project in the city, when it was completed in July 2014. The new Terminal 2 was renamed to Terminal 1. Final work on the new Terminal 1 was completed in 2017.

== Future development proposals ==
In January 2015, a two-stage plan was proposed to improve Bogota's aerial access, as part of a greater endeavor to modernize Colombia's airports. The plan included a major expansion to the current main terminal with the effect of increasing the number of gates from 37 to 56 and thus raising the capacity of the airport from 27 million passengers to 40 million. Phase 1 also includes improvements to the runway to increase efficiency. The time scale for phase one was announced as approximately 24 months. Phase 2 involves the construction of a brand new secondary airport, currently called El Dorado II, in the suburb of Facatativá west of Bogota. The new airport was due to open in 2023. It was expected that El Dorado and El Dorado II will be connected via a commuter/light rail project.

In 2023, plans were announced to double the capacity of El Dorado Airport with capacity to reach 60 million passengers with a contract awarded by 2025.

As of April 2025, the Government had released a new 3D proposal for the upcoming project El Dorado Máximo Desarrollo aka EDMAX or El Dorado Max. El Dorado MAX

== Airlines and destinations ==
=== Passenger ===
The following airlines operate regular scheduled and charter flights at the airport.

Airlines	Destinations
Aerolíneas Argentinas	Buenos Aires–Aeroparque
Aeroméxico	Mexico City–Benito Juárez
Air Canada	Montréal–Trudeau, Toronto–Pearson
Air Europa	Madrid
Air France	Paris–Charles de Gaulle
American Airlines	Dallas/Fort Worth, Miami
Arajet	Punta Cana, Santo Domingo–Las Américas
Avianca	Arauca, Armenia, Aruba, Asunción, Barcelona, Barrancabermeja, Barranquilla, Belém, Boston, Bucaramanga, Buenos Aires-Aeroparque, Buenos Aires–Ezeiza, Cali, Cancún, Caracas, Cartagena, Chicago–O'Hare, Córdoba (AR), Cúcuta, Curaçao, Cusco, Dallas/Fort Worth, Florencia, Fort Lauderdale, Georgetown–Cheddi Jagan, Guatemala City, Guayaquil, Ipiales, La Paz, Leticia, Lima, London–Heathrow, Madrid, Manaus, Maracaibo, Medellín–JMC, Mexico City–Benito Juárez, Miami, Montería, Monterrey, Montevideo, Montréal–Trudeau, Neiva, New York–JFK, Orlando, Panama City–Tocumen, Paris–Charles de Gaulle, Pasto, Pereira, Popayán, Punta Cana, Quibdó, Quito, Rio de Janeiro–Galeão, Riohacha, San Andrés Island, San José (CR), San Juan, San Salvador, Santa Cruz de la Sierra–Viru Viru, Santa Marta, Santiago de Chile, Santo Domingo–Las Américas, São Paulo–Guarulhos, Sincelejo, Tampa, Toronto–Pearson, Valencia (VE), Valledupar, Villavicencio, Washington–Dulles, Yopal
Avianca Costa Rica	San José (CR)
Avianca Ecuador	Aruba, Buenos Aires–Ezeiza, Guayaquil, Panama City–Tocumen, Quito
Avianca El Salvador	San Salvador
Avianca Express	Armenia, Barrancabermeja, Florencia, Ibagué, Neiva, Popayán, Villavicencio, Yopal
Avianca Guatemala	Guatemala City
Avior Airlines	Barcelona (VE), Caracas
Clic	Arauca, Apartadó (begins 15 February 2027), Armenia, Barrancabermeja, Bucaramanga, Buenaventura, Cali, Cartagena, Cúcuta, Florencia, La Macarena, Manizales, Medellín–Olaya Herrera, Neiva, Pereira, Pitalito, Popayán, Puerto Asís, Puerto Inírida, Quibdó, San José del Guaviare, Saravena (begins 11 November 2026), Tumaco, Villavicencio, Yopal
Copa Airlines	Panama City–Tocumen
Delta Air Lines	Atlanta
Edelweiss Air	Seasonal: Zurich^{1}
Emirates	Dubai–International, Miami
Frontier Airlines	Orlando (begins 14 December 2026)
Gol Linhas Aéreas	Brasília (ends 31 January 2027)
Iberia	Madrid
JetSmart Chile	Santiago de Chile
JetSmart Colombia	Barranquilla, Bucaramanga, Cali, Cartagena, Cúcuta, Medellín–JMC, Montería, Pereira, San Andrés Island, Santa Marta
KLM	Amsterdam^{2}
LASER Airlines	Barcelona (VE), Caracas
LATAM Brasil	São Paulo–Guarulhos
LATAM Chile	Miami, Santiago de Chile
LATAM Colombia	Armenia, Barranquilla, Bucaramanga, Cali, Caracas, Cartagena, Cúcuta, Ibagué, Leticia, Lima, Medellín–JMC, Miami, Montería, Neiva, Orlando, Pasto, Pereira, Quito, Riohacha, San Andrés Island, Santa Marta, São Paulo–Guarulhos, Yopal; Seasonal: Aruba, Barcelona (VE), Curaçao
LATAM Ecuador	Quito
LATAM Perú	Lima
Lufthansa	Frankfurt
Qatar Airways	Doha
RUTACA Airlines	Caracas
SATENA	Aguachica, Apartadó, Arauca, Buenaventura, Florencia, Girardot, Ipiales, La Macarena, Medellín–Olaya Herrera, Mitú, Paipa, Pitalito, Puerto Asís, Puerto Carreño, Puerto Inírida, Puerto Leguízamo,Quibdó, San José del Guaviare, San Vicente del Caguan, Saravena, Sincelejo, Tame, Tolú, Tumaco, Valencia (VE), Villagarzon, Villavicencio
Turkish Airlines	Istanbul^{3}
Turpial Airlines	Caracas, Valencia (VE)
United Airlines	Houston–Intercontinental, Newark
Viva	Cancún, Guadalajara, Mexico City–Felipe Ángeles, Monterrey
Volaris	Guadalajara, Mexico City–Felipe Ángeles
Wingo	Armenia, Aruba, Barranquilla, Bucaramanga, Cali, Cancún, Caracas, Cartagena, Guatemala City, Havana, Medellín–JMC, Panama City–Balboa, Panama City–Tocumen, Pereira, Punta Cana, Santa Marta, Santo Domingo–Las Américas, Valencia (VE); Seasonal: Curaçao, Montego Bay, Porlamar, Puerto Plata; Charter: Río Hato

Notes:

- ^1 Edelweiss Air's flight from Bogotá to Zurich makes a stop in Cartagena. However, the airline does not have eighth freedom traffic rights to transport passengers solely between Bogotá and Cartagena.
- ^2 KLM's flight from Bogotá to Amsterdam makes a stop in Cartagena. However, the airline does not have eighth freedom traffic rights to transport passengers solely between Bogotá and Cartagena.
- ^3 Turkish Airlines' flight from Bogotá to Istanbul makes a stop in Panama City. However, the airline does not have traffic rights to transport passengers solely between Bogotá and Panama City.
- ^4 Qatar Airways' flight from Bogotá to Doha will make a stop in Caracas. However, the airline will not have traffic rights to transport passengers solely between Bogotá and Caracas.

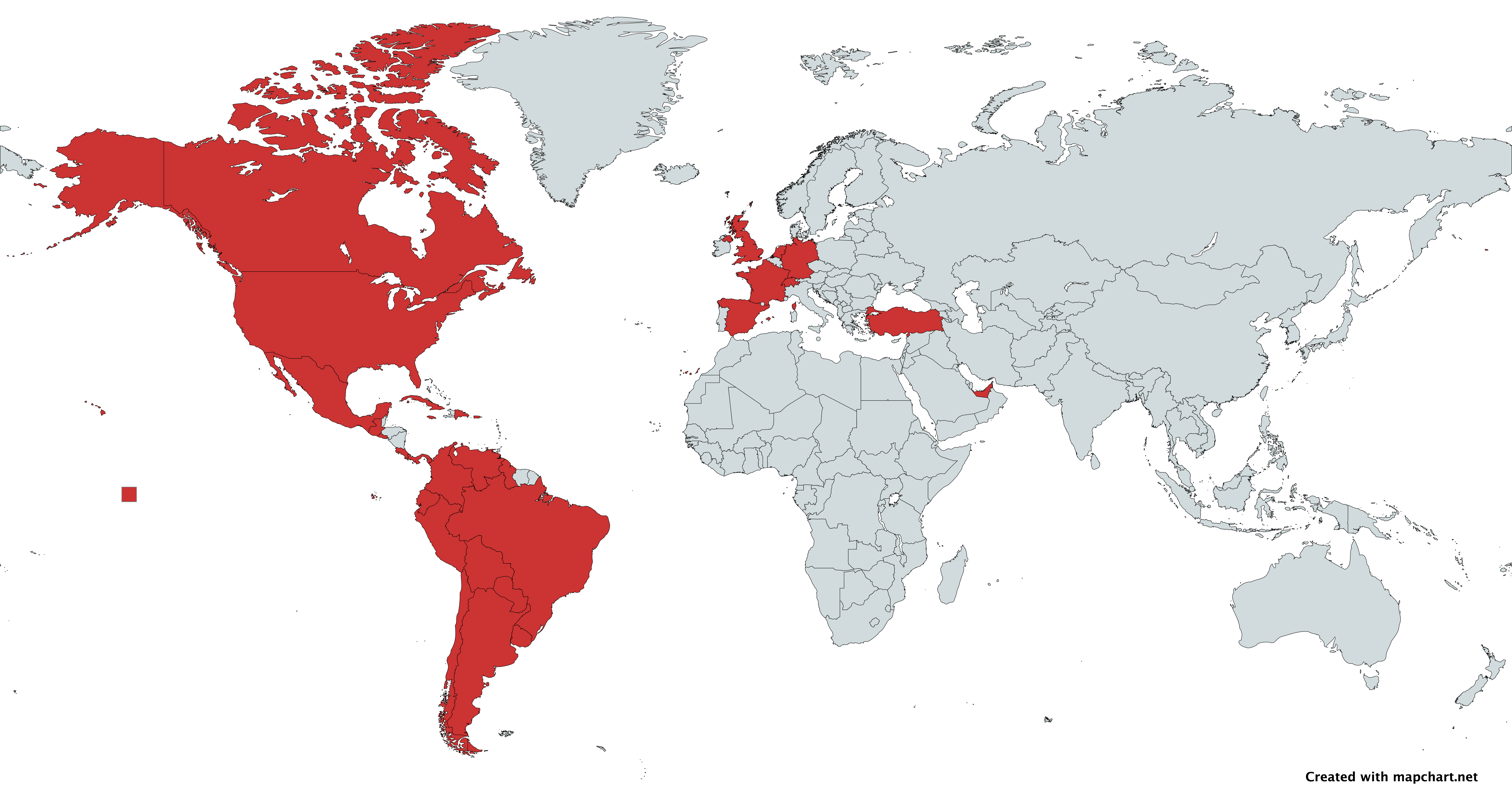
Bogotá El Dorado International Airport international passenger destinations

=== Cargo ===
Airlines	Destinations
21 Air	Miami
ABX Air	Miami
AerCaribe	Miami
Aerosucre	Quito
AeroUnion	Mexico City–Benito Juárez, Miami
Air Canada Cargo	Atlanta, Miami, San Juan
Amerijet International	Miami, Port of Spain
Atlas Air	Miami
Avianca Cargo	Asunción, Caracas, Campinas, Curitiba, Dallas/Fort Worth, Lima, Medellín–JMC, Miami, Montevideo, Quito, Santiago de Chile
Cargojet	Miami
Cargolux	Aguadilla, Latacunga, Luxembourg, Quito, Santiago de Chile
Copa Airlines Cargo	Caracas, Panama City–Tocumen
DHL Aero Expreso	Cincinnati, Miami, Panama City–Tocumen
Emirates SkyCargo	Dubai–Al Maktoum
Ethiopian Airlines Cargo	Addis Ababa, Liège, Mexico City, Miami, Quito, Zaragoza
FedEx Express	Memphis, Miami
Korean Air Cargo	Seoul–Incheon, Tokyo–Narita
LATAM Cargo Brasil	Fortaleza, Guayaquil, Manaus, Miami, Quito
LATAM Cargo Chile	Miami
LATAM Cargo Colombia	Amsterdam, Huntsville, Miami, Quito, Rio de Janeiro–Galeão
Lufthansa Cargo	Frankfurt
Martinair	Amsterdam, Miami, Quito
Mas Air	Guadalajara, Mexico City–Benito Juárez
Qatar Airways Cargo	Doha, Luxembourg, Mexico City
Turkish Cargo	Istanbul, Maastricht/Aachen, Miami, New York–JFK, Zaragoza
UPS Airlines	Louisville, Miami, Quito
Western Global Airlines	Miami

== Accidents and incidents ==
- On 19 April 1960, a Lloyd Aéreo Colombiano Curtiss C-46 Commando crashed on approach to BOG because of loss of height and speed in the final approach turn. Six crew and 31 passengers out of 51 on board were killed.
- On 22 September 1966, an Avianca Douglas DC-4 struck trees attempting to return to the airport following engine problems. Both occupants died.
- On 18 December 1966, a Aerocondo-Aerovías Cóndor de Colombia Lockheed L-1649 Starliner crashed on approach 10-20m short of the runway threshold. Four crew and 13 passengers died out of the 59 on board.
- On 21 January 1972, a Lineas Aereas La Urraca Vickers Viscount crashed during a rainstorm shortly after leaving Bogota for San Andes. All five crew and 15 passengers perished.
- On 7 June 1973, Vickers Viscount HK-1061 of Aerolíneas TAO was damaged beyond economic repair in an accident on landing.
- On 27 August 1973, an Aerocondor-Aerovías Cóndor de Colombia Lockheed L-188 Electra flew into a mountain 12 km (7.4 mi) SE of BOG because the flight crew did not follow the prescribed departure procedure following takeoff. All six crew and 36 passengers died.
- On 10 July 1975, an Aerocondor Lockheed L-188 Electra veered to the right shortly after lift off, sank back and struck another aircraft, causing a fire that destroyed both aircraft. Two occupants out of the four occupants died.
- On 29 April 1978, a LAC Colombia Douglas DC-6 crashed 1 km NW of the airport because the aircraft was configured for cargo, not for carrying passengers. All three crew and five out the nine passengers were killed.
- On 22 August 1979, a SATERA Hawker Siddeley HS 748 was stolen by a 23-year-old man who was an airline mechanic who was just fired. The aircraft crashed into a Bogota suburb, killing the pilot and three on the ground.
- On 24 January 1980, Douglas C-53D HK-2214 of Aerotal Colombia crashed after an in-flight engine failure following which the propeller on the engine was feathered. The aircraft was on a test flight. All four on board were killed.
- On 8 February 1986, Douglas DC-3 HK-3031 of SAEP Colombia crashed on approach. The port engine had lost power shortly after take-off on a cargo flight to Rondón Airport and the decision was made to return to Bogotá. Although the aircraft was destroyed in the post-impact fire, all five people on board survived.
- On 27 November 1989, Avianca Flight 203, flying from Bogota to Alfonso Bonilla Aragon International Airport in Cali, was destroyed by a bomb while flying over Soacha. All 107 passengers and crew and three people on the ground died. Pablo Escobar bombed the plane in an attempt to assassinate presidential candidate César Gaviria Trujillo, who was not on the plane and was elected President of Colombia in 1990.
- On 25 January 1990, Avianca Flight 052, flying on a Bogotá-Medellín-New York JFK route, crashed on Long Island after running out of fuel.
- On 20 February 1993, a Cargo Three Panama Convair CV-440 crashed into a field 3 km (1.9 mi) W of the airport because of an engine fire. Both occupants perished.
- On 20 April 1998, Air France Flight 422 from El Dorado Airport to Quito, Ecuador, using an aircraft leased from TAME and flown with Ecuadorian crew, crashed less than two minutes after taking off into a mountain in eastern Bogotá. All 43 passengers and 10 crew died.
- On 11 October 2007, a Rio Jur Beechcraft Super King Air impacted the ground after banking right abruptly, passed a hangar, then impacted houses near the approach end of the runway. All five occupants were killed along with two on the ground.
- On 7 July 2008, a Kalitta Air Boeing 747-209B, operating as Centurion Air Cargo Flight 164 on an aircraft that had been leased to Centurion Air Cargo, crashed shortly after departing from El Dorado International Airport in Bogotá at 3:55 am. The plane was en route to Miami, Florida, with a shipment of flowers. After reporting a fire in one of the engines, the plane attempted returning to the airport but crashed near the village of Madrid, Colombia. One of the plane's engines hit a farm house, killing an adult and two children who lived there. The crew of eight survived.
- On November 10, 2024, an Aerosucre Boeing 727-200 Freighter aircraft, taking off on a flight, Aerosucre flight 372, to Valencia, Venezuela, overran the runway and struck a localizer antenna after becoming airborne, damaging the jet's landing gear and left wing. The plane burned fuel on the air for one hour before landing safely at Bogota. No injuries were reported.

== Accolades ==
In 2016 and 2017 the airport was named the best in South America by World Airport Awards. It received four-star rating by Skytrax and was listed in the top 50 of the "World's Top 100 Airports" list in both years. Its staff was rated the best in South America by the World Airport Awards in 2017.

== In media ==
- This airport was featured in episodes of 'Airport Security: Colombia' Documentary show of National Geographic HD TV channel.

== See also ==
- Transport in Colombia
- List of airports in Colombia
- List of the busiest airports in Colombia
- Guaymaral Airport
- Migración Colombia
