= Camilo Daza International Airport =

Airport in Cúcuta, Colombia

Camilo Daza International Airport Aeropuerto Internacional Camilo Daza
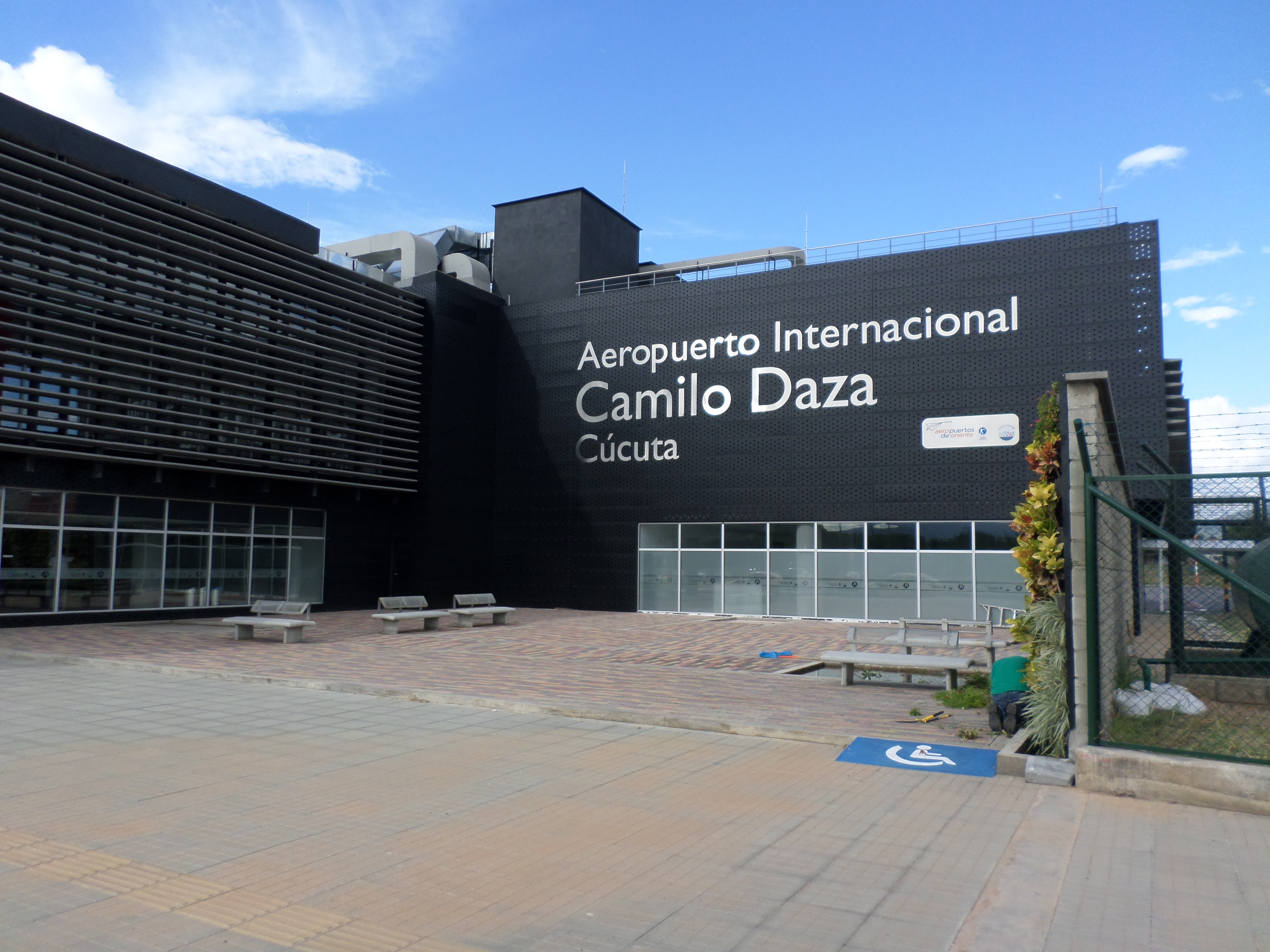
- IATA: CUC; ICAO: SKCC

Summary
- Airport type: Public
- Operator: Aerocivil
- Serves: Cúcuta
- Elevation AMSL: 1,096 ft (334 m)
- Coordinates: 7°55′39″N 72°30′42″W

Map
- Location of airport in Colombia

Runways
Direction	Length		Surface
Direction	ft	m	Surface
03/21	6,342	1,933	Asphalt
16/34	7,700	2,347	Asphalt

Statistics (2018)
- Passengers movement: 949,292
- Cargo movement: 27,589 t (27,153 long tons; 30,412 short tons)
- Air Operations: 31,173
- Sources: WAD Google Maps

Camilo Daza International Airport (Spanish: Aeropuerto Internacional Camilo Daza, IATA: CUC, ICAO: SKCC) is an international airport located in Cúcuta, Colombia. It serves the Norte de Santander Department.

The airport is 5 kilometres (3.1 mi) from the center of Cúcuta. It has international facilities and is able to operate general aviation flights to international destinations. It is named after Colombian aviation pioneer Camilo Daza.

== History ==
Camilo Daza International Airport was inaugurated on October 10, 1971, by the then President of the Republic, Misael Pastrana Borrero, and his Minister of Public Works, Argerino Duran Quintero. At the initiative of then President of the Society of Public Improvements, Juan Agustín Ramírez Calderón, the airport was given the name of Camilo Daza as a tribute to the aviation pioneer and founder of the Colombian Air Force.

On March 17, 1988, Avianca Flight 410, a Boeing 727 crashed on low mountains after takeoff to Cartagena's Rafael Núñez International Airport. All 143 people on board died. This was the only air accident in the history of the city.

In 2005, the Civil Aeronautics of Colombia Agency announced a renovation of the airport, seeking to transform it into one of the most modern in the nation. This renovation improved the air terminal infrastructure, provided a more contemporary design, and made air traffic safer with a powerful light at night.

The airport was renovated and expanded again from 2018 to 2019. A new facade was built, along with a new food plaza and offices for Aerocivil. The terminal was extended, the parking lot expanded to a capacity of 300 vehicles, and the check-in and baggage claim areas were renovated. The newly renovated and expanded airport was inaugurated on 26 April 2019.

=== 2021 attack ===
At around 5:00 A.M., on December 14, 2021, explosive substances being carried by a man trying to climb an airport fence detonated.

One hour later, a suitcase exploded again on the runway, resulting in the deaths of two police officers. The airport was evacuated as authorities suspended all upcoming flights. Colombian Defence Minister Diego Molano denounced the incident as a terrorist attack by left-wing guerillas based in Venezuela.

== Structure and capacity ==
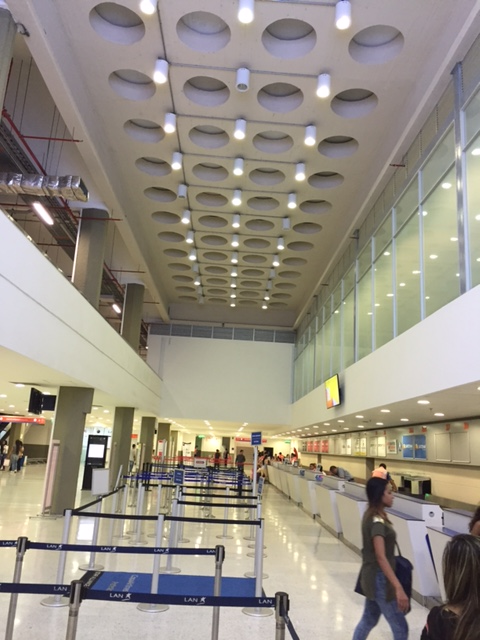
Main Hall of the airport

- Avianca has its own lounge with different services such as Wi-Fi, different environments, satellite television, bar meals, air conditioning and various entertainment materials.

== Airlines and destinations ==
Airlines	Destinations
Avianca	Bogotá, Medellín–JMC
Clic	Bucaramanga; Seasonal: Cartagena (begins 26 December 2026)
Copa Airlines	Panama City–Tocumen
JetSmart Colombia	Bogotá, Cartagena, Medellín–JMC
LATAM Colombia	Bogotá
SATENA	Arauca, Barranquilla, Ocaña

== See also ==
- Transport in Colombia
- List of airports in Colombia
