= Central Charter de Colombia =

Charter airline of Colombia

Central Aerospace
- Founded: November 28, 1979; 45 years ago
- Operating bases: El Dorado International Airport
- Headquarters: Bogotá, Colombia
- Website: www.centralaerospace.com

Central Aerospace is a Colombian charter airline and aerospace services company based at El Dorado International Airport in Bogotá.

== History ==
The company was founded on November 28, 1979, as a charter operator supporting oil exploration. In 1991, it was renamed Central Charter de Colombia, S.A. and began operating regular executive charter flights. The company also provides maintenance services for specific aircraft types.

In 2016, Central Charter was acquired by a subsidiary of Signature Aviation (formerly BBA Aviation). In 2019, the company was renamed Central Aerospace.
