= Málaga, Santander =

Coordinates: 6°47′N 72°40′W

- Municipality and town
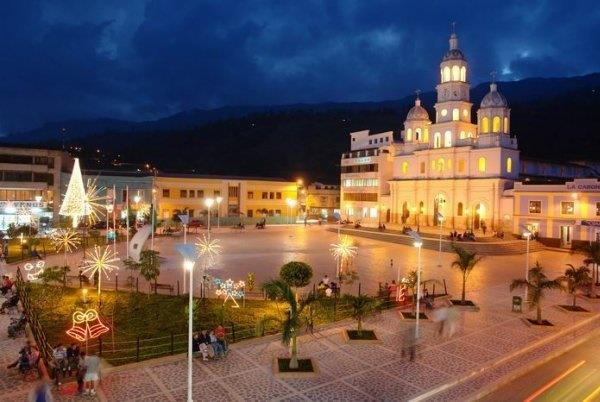

- Flag Coat of arms

- Location of the municipality and town of Málaga, Santander in the Santander Department of Colombia.
- Country: Colombia
- Department: Santander Department

Area
  - Total: 61 km^{2} (24 sq mi)

Population (Census 2018)
  - Total: 19,884
  - Density: 330/km^{2} (840/sq mi)
- Time zone: UTC-5 (Colombia Standard Time)

Málaga (Spanish pronunciation: [ˈmalaɣa]) is a town and municipality in the Santander Department in northeastern Colombia.

== Transportation ==
The town is served by Jerónimo de Aguayo Airport.
