= Santiago Pérez Quiroz Airport =

Santiago Pérez Quiroz Airport Aeropuerto Santiago Pérez Quiroz
- IATA: AUC; ICAO: SKUC

Summary
- Airport type: Public
- Owner: Aerocivil
- Serves: Arauca, Colombia
- Elevation AMSL: 423 ft (129 m)
- Coordinates: 7°04′07″N 70°44′05″W

Map
- Location of airport in Colombia

Runways
| Direction | Length | | Surface |
| Direction | m | ft | Surface |
|---|---|---|---|
| 11/29 | 2,100 | 6,890 | Asphalt |
- Sources: AIP GCM

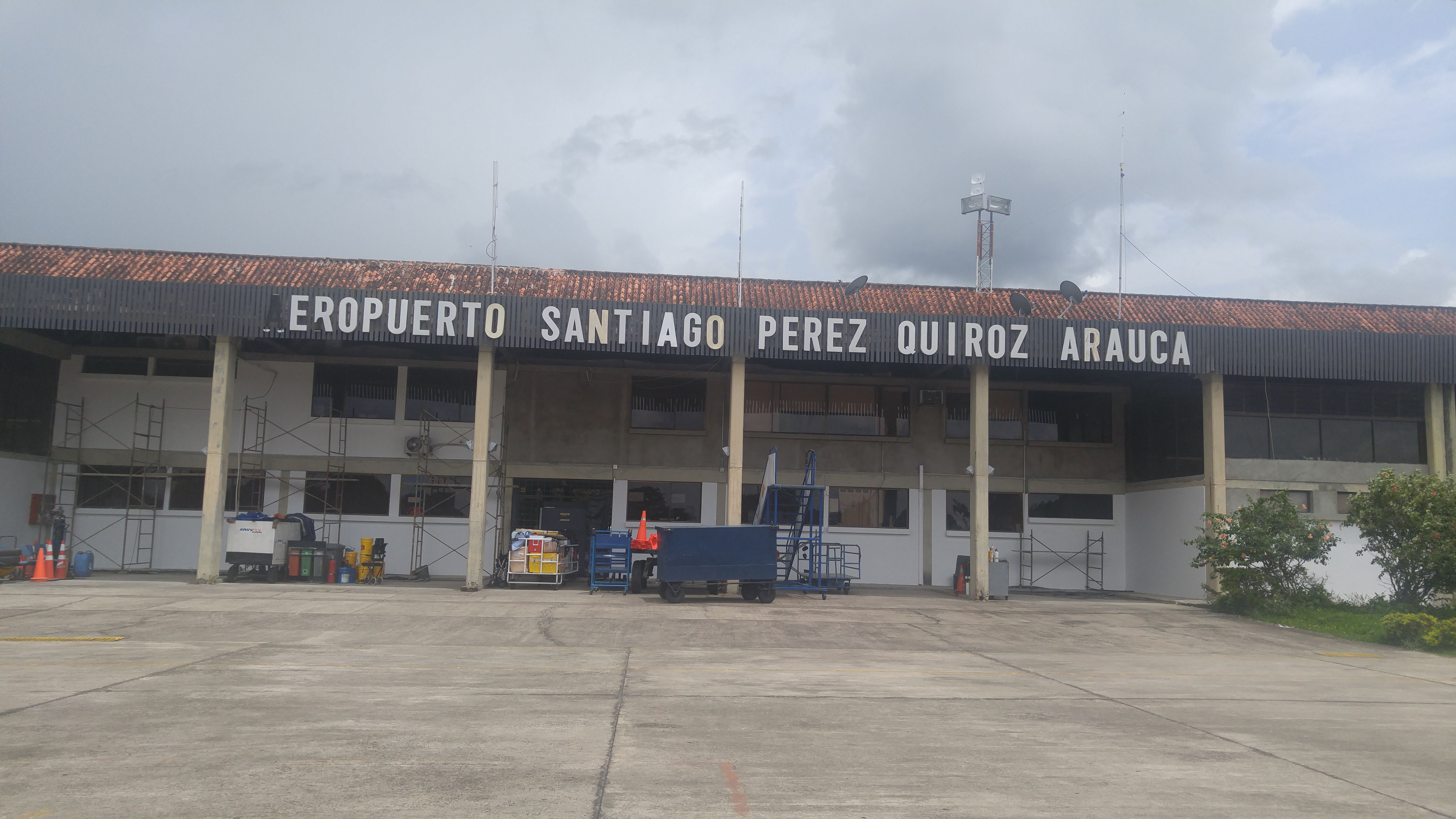
An entrance to the airport

Santiago Pérez Quiroz Airport (Spanish: Aeropuerto Santiago Pérez Quiroz (IATA: AUC, ICAO: SKUC)) is an airport serving Arauca, the capital of the Arauca Department in Colombia. The runway is southeast of the city, and 2 kilometres (1.2 mi) south of Colombia's border with Venezuela.

== Airlines and destinations ==
| Airlines | Destinations |
|---|---|
| Avianca | Bogotá |
| Clic | Bucaramanga |
| SATENA | Bogotá, Bucaramanga, Cúcuta, Villavicencio |

== See also ==
- Transport in Colombia
- List of airports in Colombia
