= Los Colonizadores Airport =

- IATA: RVE; ICAO: SKSA

Summary
- Airport type: Public
- Location: Saravena, Colombia
- Elevation AMSL: 672 ft (205 m)
- Coordinates: 6°57′05″N 71°51′25″W

Map
- Location of the airport in Colombia

Runways
Direction	Length		Surface
Direction	m	ft	Surface
16/34	1,200	3,937	Asphalt
- Sources: GCM Google Maps

Los Colonizadores Airport (IATA: RVE, ICAO: SKSA) is an airport serving Saravena in the Arauca Department of Colombia. The runway is just east of the town.

The runway length includes a 400 metres (1,300 ft) displaced threshold on Runway 16. The Saravena non-directional beacon (Ident: SVA) is located on the field.

== Airlines and destinations ==
Airlines	Destinations
Clic	Bucaramanga
SATENA	Bogotá, Bucaramanga

== See also ==
- Transport in Colombia
- List of airports in Colombia
