= Jerónimo de Aguayo Airport =

Málaga Airport Jerónimo de Aguayo Airport
- IATA: none; ICAO: SKLA

Summary
- Airport type: Public
- Serves: Málaga, Colombia
- Elevation AMSL: 6,710 ft / 2,045 m
- Coordinates: 6°42′22″N 72°43′50″W

Map
- Location of the airport in Colombia

Runways
Direction	Length		Surface
Direction	m	ft	Surface
15/33	992	3,255	Grass
- Sources: GCM Google Maps

Málaga Airport ((ICAO: SKLA)) is a regional airport serving the municipality of Málaga, located in the Santander Department of northeastern Colombia.

Situated in the eastern range of the Cordillera Oriental of the Andes Mountains, both the airport and the town lie on a prominent north–south ridge at high elevation. The airport's single runway is located along the northern edge of the urban area.

== See also ==
- Transport in Colombia
- List of airports in Colombia

== See also ==
- Transport in Colombia
- List of airports in Colombia
