= AerCaribe =

Colombian airline

AerCaribe S.A.
| IATA | ICAO | Call sign |
|---|---|---|
| JK | ACL | AERCARIBE |
- Founded: 1997; 29 years ago
- Commenced operations: 2006; 20 years ago
- Operating bases: El Dorado International Airport
- Subsidiaries: AerCaribe Peru S.A.C.
- Fleet size: 16
- Destinations: Caribbean, Central America, South America
- Headquarters: Bogotá, Colombia
- Key people: Jorge Luis Almeira Quiroz
- Website: www.aercaribe.com

AerCaribe Peru S.A.C.
| IATA | ICAO | Call sign |
|---|---|---|
| EF | CPR | CARIBE-PERU |
- Founded: 2011; 15 years ago
- Commenced operations: 2013; 13 years ago
- Operating bases: Jorge Chávez International Airport
- Fleet size: 13
- Destinations: Caribbean, Central America, South America
- Parent company: AerCaribe S.A.
- Headquarters: Lima, Peru
- Website: www.aercaribe.com

AerCaribe S.A., operating as AerCaribe, is a Colombia-based carrier operating both domestic and Americas-wide executive, charter and cargo services, as well as specialized fuel and military transport. The carrier is based at El Dorado International Airport in Bogotá, with a secondary base at Jorge Chávez International Airport in Lima operating as AerCaribe Peru, and operates a fleet of turboprop and jet aircraft.

== History ==
AerCaribe began operations in 2006 with a fleet of Antonov turboprop aircraft, with domestic services in Colombia. AerCaribe operates its own 3,000sqm hangar at El Dorado, with departure and VIP lounges, conference rooms, and a restaurant. The carrier is certified by Antonov to offer maintenance and restoration works on Antonov aircraft in Colombia and Latin America, as well to act as a representative of Antonov in the sale and purchase of Antonov aircraft.

In 2011, AerCaribe launched its first subsidiary, AerCaribe S.A.C. Peru, operating as AerCaribe Peru. It is a Peruvian-based carrier which operates scheduled and charter cargo services from its base in Lima Jorge Chávez International Airport within Peru.

In 2015, AerCaribe received its first of three converted B737-300P2Fs (passenger to freighter) from PEMCO World Air Services, in Tampa, Florida, US. The aircraft offers 11 pallet positions, a full-featured cargo loading system with retractable sill plate and over-rideable side restraints, all engineered to deliver good reliability and a 48,000lbs (22 tonnes) maximum payload.

In 2019, it was announced that AerCaribe was looking into commencing operations from its base in Colombia, and its sub-base in Peru under its subsidiary AerCaribe Peru, to the United States.

On 14th October 2020, one of the An-32s crashed while landing in Iquitos. The aircraft was destroyed, but the crew survived.

== Destinations ==
AerCaribe and AerCaribe Peru both offer scheduled and charter cargo services from their respective bases within Colombia, Latin America, and the Caribbean, as well as within Peru.

== Fleet ==
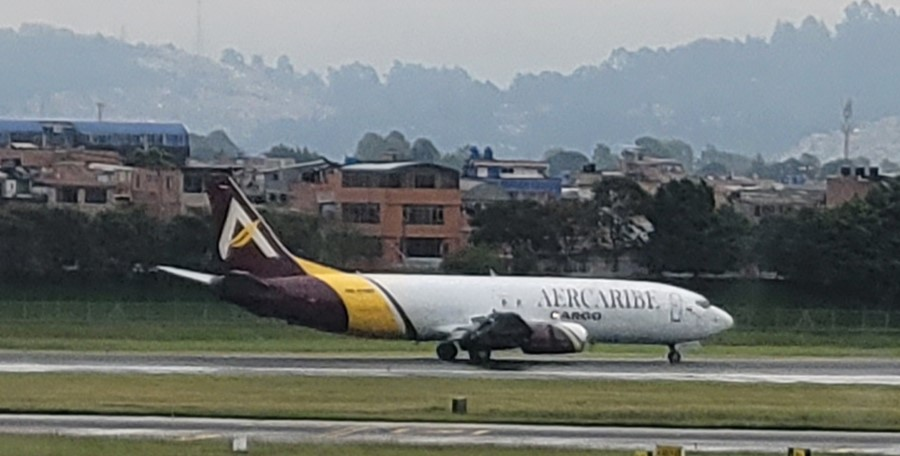
AerCaribe Boeing 737-400F at Bogotá Airport

As of May 2024, both AerCaribe and AerCaribe Peru operates the following aircraft:

AerCaribe fleet
| Aircraft | In service | Orders | Notes |
|---|---|---|---|
| Boeing 737-300F As of July 2026 | 1 | - | - |
| Boeing 737-400F As of July 2026 | 2 | - | - |
| Boeing 737-400SF As of July 2026 | 3 | - | - |
| Antonov An-26 | 3 | - | - |
| Antonov An-32 | 7 | - | - |
| Total | 16 | - | |

== Accidents and incidents ==
- January 28, 2017: An AerCaribe Colombia Boeing 737-400F overran the runway while landing in Leticia, tearing off the main landing gear. The aircraft was damaged beyond repair.
- October 14, 2020: An AerCaribe Peru Antonov An-32 veered off the runway in Iquitos, ripping off the wings and landing gear, starting a fire. All the crew members survived, but the aircraft was written off.

== See also ==
- List of airlines of Colombia
- List of airlines of Peru
