= Las Gaviotas Airport =

- IATA: LGT; ICAO: SKGA

Summary
- Airport type: Public
- Serves: Las Gaviotas, Colombia
- Elevation AMSL: 591 ft / 180 m
- Coordinates: 4°33′00″N 70°55′35″W

Map
- Location of the airport in Colombia

Runways
Direction	Length		Surface
Direction	m	ft	Surface
06/24	1,355	4,446	Grass
- Sources: GCM Google Maps

Las Gaviotas Airport (IATA: LGT, ICAO: SKGA) is an airport serving the agricultural village of Las Gaviotas, in the Vichada Department of Colombia.

== See also ==
- Transport in Colombia
- List of airports in Colombia
