= List of accidents and incidents involving the Let L-410 Turbolet =

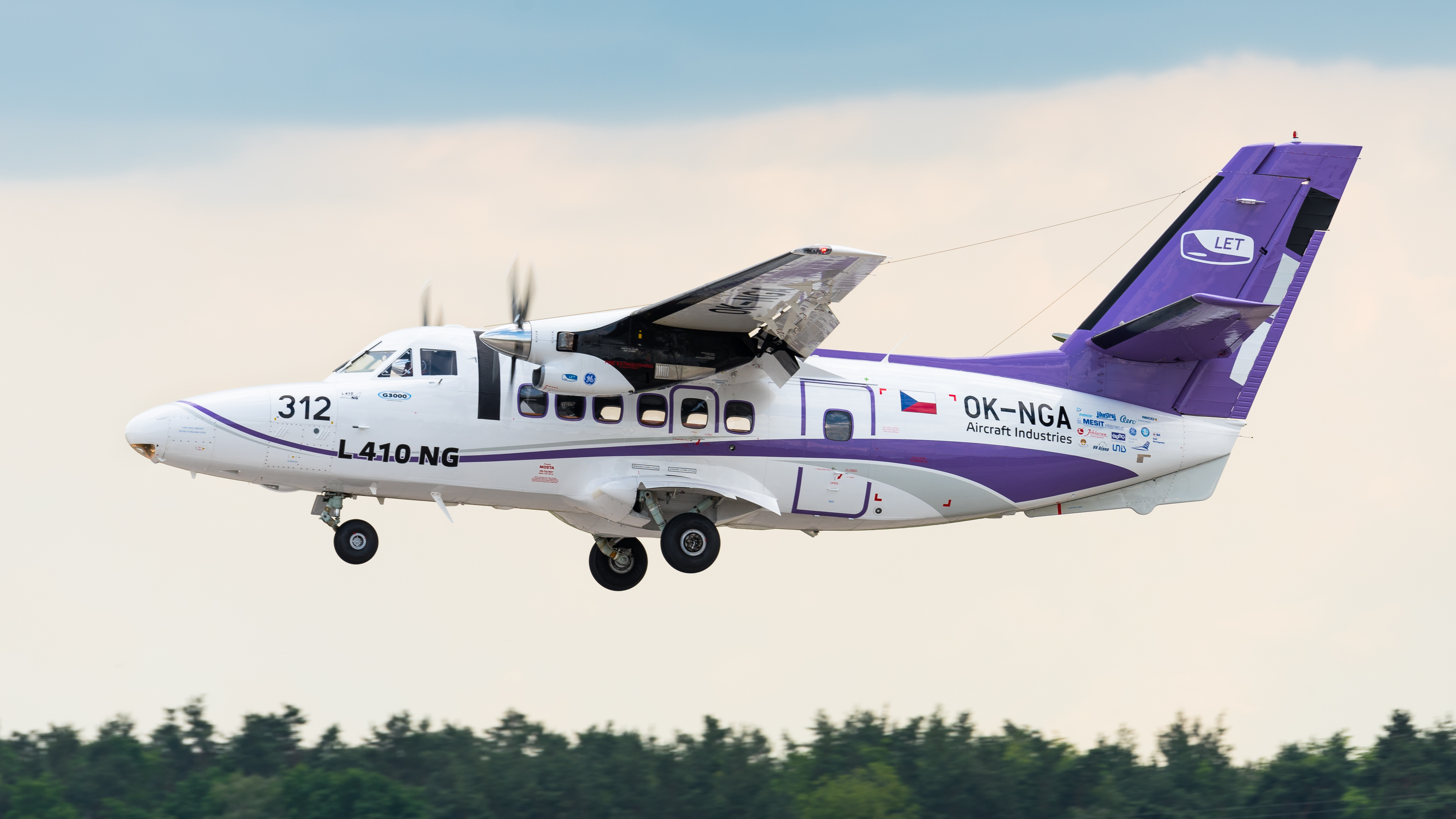
Let L-410 Turbolet

Transport aircraft the Let L-410 Turbolet completed its maiden flight on 16 April 1969. This popular aircraft went through a number of improvements and modernization and the latest types, the L 410 UVP-E20 and L 420 are EASA and FAA certified respectively. According to statistics, the L-410 Turbolet can be considered a safe aircraft because it has had 118 accidents during its development out of a total of 1,200 aircraft produced and exported. While only a few of these accidents were fatal, some say the safety record of the aircraft is influenced more by operational practices than its design. Some customers and regulators have chosen certain practices that impact the overall safety performance.

== 1970s ==
- 18 April 1972: A Slov-Air L-410A (OK-ADN) was hijacked by two people during a flight from Mariánské Lázně to Prague and flown to Nürnburg, Germany. During the hijacking, the first officer was shot and wounded. After landing, the hijackers sought asylum in West Germany. After serving time in prison, the hijackers were granted asylum in 1976.
- 8 June 1972: OK-ADN was hijacked a second time on the same flight route by two passengers, one of whom was armed. Over the Becov control point the hijackers grabbed both pilots headphones and shouted "Fly to West Germany, otherwise I will shoot you dead!" A gunshot was heard as the pilot was shot dead. The armed hijacker then threatened to shoot the copilot as well, demanding to be flown to Munich. Eight other hijackers rose up and attacked the four remaining passengers with bottles to avoid the resistance of a possible security guard on board. The copilot informed the hijacker that the aircraft did not have enough fuel to reach Munich and would land in a nearby large city. After the hijackers realized they were in West Germany, the aircraft landed at Weiden. Ten hijackers escaped, but were later caught by police.
- 1975: An L-410A (OK-DKD) still owned by Let burned out in a fire.
- 7 July 1977: The third prototype L-410 (OK-162) crashed near Nedakonice due to tail separation caused by pilot error during a test flight, killing the four crew.
- 6 August 1977: An Air Service Hungary L-410AF (HA-YFA) crashed into Lake Balaton while flying low, killing one of four on board.
- 18 January 1979: An Aeroflot L-410M (CCCP-67210) crashed in a field near Belgorod Airport during a training flight following a loss of control, killing the three crew. The crew was practicing flying turns with one engine out.
- 3 August 1979: Aeroflot Flight 1643, an L-410M (CCCP-67206), crashed near Rzhevka Airport due to a loss of control following engine failure, killing 10 of 14 on board.

== 1980s ==
- 18 February 1981: An Aeroflot L-410M (CCCP-67273) burned out in Russia following a cabin or cockpit fire.
- 7 January 1982: Aeroflot Flight G-96, an L-410M (CCCP-67290), struck a hill near Gelendzhik, Russia, killing all 18 on board. The aircraft had drifted off course due to pilot error.
- 10 February 1982: An Aeroflot L-410M (CCCP-62737) was written off after it was struck by an out-of-control An-2 (CCCP-70349).
- 14 August 1982: Aeroflot Flight G-73, an L-410M (CCCP-67191), was taxiing for takeoff at Babusheri Airport when it was struck by Aeroflot Flight 974, a Tu-134A (CCCP-65836) that was taking off from the same airport, killing all 11 on board the L-410; all 82 on board the Tu-134 survived. Both aircraft were written off.
- 29 March 1983: Aeroflot Flight G-70, an L-410M (CCCP-67190), struck the side of a hill at Poti Airport while attempting a forced landing following engine failure, killing six of 18 on board.
- 19 October 1983: An Aeroflot L-410UVP (CCCP-67315) overran the runway at Kansk Air Base and struck an obstacle.
- 4 July 1984: An Aeroflot L-410M (CCCP-67276) was written off after landing hard at Chulman Airport, collapsing the landing gear.
- 4 December 1984: Aeroflot Flight F-637, an L-410MA (CCCP-67225), crashed near Kostroma, Russia due to a loss of control after the pilots became disorientated, killing all 17 on board.
- 29 December 1984: An Aeroflot L-410UVP (CCCP-67140) force-landed near Lineinoye, Russia (76 km (47 mi) from Astrakhan) after both engines quit due to fuel starvation; there were no casualties, but the aircraft was written off. The fuel filler caps had not been closed before takeoff and fuel was sucked out of the tanks during the flight.
- 14 October 1986: Aeroflot Flight 763, a L-410MU (CCCP-67264), crashed in the Aldan River shortly after takeoff from Ust-Maya Airport; all 14 on board drowned because the doors could not be opened. The aircraft lost control following left engine failure.
- 31 December 1986: An Aeroflot L-410UVP (CCCP-67428) ran off the apron at Chernenko Airport (now Sharypovo Airport); no casualties.
- 13 June 1987: An Aeroflot L-410M (CCCP-67239) was written off following a ground incident with two An-2s.
- 24 September 1987: An Aeroflot L-410MU (CCCP-67249) was written off following an aborted takeoff at Yakutsk Airport. During the takeoff roll, the left landing gear brake failed and became stuck on. The left wheel dug into the ground, causing the left wing tip and nose to hit the ground.
- 18 October 1987: An Aeroflot L-410UVP (CCCP-67334) was written off following a wheels-up landing at Saratov Airport.
- 19 April 1988: An Aeroflot L-410UVP (CCCP-67518) struck a hill 74 mi (119 km) northeast of Bagdarin, Russia in bad weather, killing all 17 on board. The pilots had deviated from the flight route and began descending too soon.
- 26 August 1988: An Aeroflot L-410MU (CCCP-67235) struck a mountain side at Irkutsk, killing all four on board. The crew had failed to set the altimeters properly.
- 7 December 1988: An Aeroflot L-410UVP (CCCP-67127) crashed short of the runway at Kodinsk, killing six of 14 on board. The altimeter warning was set incorrectly and the crew did not use the outer marker.
- 28 August 1989: An Aeroflot L-410UVP (CCCP-67104) force-landed near Labinsk, Russia due to loss of control following engine failure; all 17 on board survived.
- 13 September 1989: An Aero Vodochody L-410M (OK-FDC) was written off following a night landing at Klecany Airport; the aircraft is now in a museum.

== 1990s ==
- 15 October 1991: A Soviet Air Force L-410UVP stalled and crashed at Balashov Airfield during a training flight, killing all three on board.
- 4 April 1992: A Kamchatavia L-410UVP (CCCP-67130) struck terrain and crashed 5 km from Baykovo Airport; one passenger died when a propeller separated and sliced through the fuselage. The aircraft descended too soon for a visual approach to Baykovo, but because the pilots were distracted while looking for landmarks, the aircraft continued to descend until it crashed.
- 26 August 1993: Sakha Avia Flight 301, an L-410UVP-E (RA-67656), stalled and crashed short of the runway at Aldan Airport, killing all 24 on board. The aircraft was overloaded and the center of gravity was too far to the rear, causing the aircraft to pitch up while the flaps were extended for landing. The crash remains the deadliest involving the L-410.
- 20 January 1995: An Abakan Airlines L-410UVP (RA-67120) crashed on takeoff from Krasnoyarsk Airport after the number two propeller feathered (probably due to fuel contamination), killing three of 16 on board.
- 7 June 1995: Latvian Air Force L-410UVP 146 participated in an airshow in Lielvārde military base in Latvia, during which the pilots tried to perform an (unsanctioned) barrel roll. The maneuver likely would have been successful, but the initial altitude was too low (about 350 meters) and the aircraft crashed some 150 meters from spectators, killing both pilots.
- 18 May 1996: An Archana Airways L-410UVP-E9D (VT-ETB) touched down late and overran the runway at Kanpur Airport, striking the boundary wall of the airport and came to a halt. All 19 people on board survived.
- 11 July 1996: An Archana Airways L-410UVP-E9D (VT-ETC) crashed in a forest near Kanda, India, killing all nine people on board. Airline negligence was blamed.
- 13 January 1998: An Aeroservice International L-410UVP-E3 (YV-928CP) was being ferried from Gomel to Kunovice when it crashed short of the runway at Turany Airport in poor visibility, killing both pilots. The FDR was not working.
- 7 December 1999: Asian Spirit Flight 100, an L-410UVP-E (RP-C3883) crashed onto a mountainside between the municipalities of Kasibu, Nueva Vizcaya and Cabarroguis, Quirino, both in the Philippines. All 15 passengers and both crew members on board lost their lives.

== 2000s ==
- 15 January 2000: A Taxi Aero Centroamericano (TACSA) L-410UVP-E (YS-09-C) crashed shortly after takeoff off from Tobias Bolanos Airport due to crew error, killing 5 of 18 on board.
- 12 September 2001: An Aero Ferinco L-410UVP-E (XA-ACM) with 19 people on board, including University of Washington Husky football fans, alumni and alumni association members crashed into the jungle in the Mexican state of Yucatán, killing all people on board.
- 18 September 2001: Atlantic Airlines Flight 870, an L-410UVP-E, stalled and crashed on takeoff from La Aurora International Airport when the center of gravity was outside limits, killing eight of 13 on board.
- 16 December 2001: a Heliandes Let L-410 (HK-4175X) crashed into a hillside just after takeoff from Medellín-Enrique Olaya Herrera Airport. All 16 occupants were killed. According to the incident report, the cause was a failure to follow standard company procedures or the approved flight plan combined with the formation of cumulus clouds making visual operations difficult.
- 8 February 2002: USAF L-410UVP-E3 00-0292 crashed at Fort Bliss.
- 1 March 2003: A Borki Air Club L-410UVP (FLARF-01032) crashed near Borki, Russia during a skydiving flight, killing both pilots and nine of 23 passengers. The aircraft was overloaded and the center of gravity was too far to the rear. At 3,900 m (12,800 ft) 11 skydivers prepared to jump out. When four of them jumped the aircraft pitched up. The aircraft stalled, entered a left dive, and lost control and later broke up.
- 24 August 2003: Tropical Airways Flight 1301, an L-410UVP-E3 (HH-PRV), crashed in a sugarcane field while attempting to return to the airport after the forward baggage door opened during takeoff from an airport in Cap-Haïtien, Haiti, killing all 21 people on board.
- 23 May 2004: A Blue Bird Aviation L-410UVP-E3 (5Y-VVD) crashed 18 mi south of Mwingi following a mid-air collision with another Blue Bird Aviation L-410 (5Y-VVA), killing both pilots; although 5Y-VVA was damaged in the collision, it was able to land safely.
- 27 January 2005: A Farnair Hungary L-410UVP-E4 (HA-LAR) was carrying out a non-directional beacon let-down with radar assistance at Iași Airport, Romania, but when the crew notified air traffic control of their position over the airport beacon and their intention to turn right outbound, they were seen to turn left. The aircraft then descended down to crash near a road. Both crew members on board were killed.
- 26 March 2005: West Caribbean Airways Flight 9955, an L-410UVP-E (HK-4146), failed to gain altitude on takeoff from El Embrujo Airport due to engine failure and struck hills close to runway 17, killing both pilots and 7 of the 12 passengers on board.
- 2 June 2005: A Transportes Aéreos Guatemaltecos L-410UVP-E3 (TG-TAG) carrying 17 passengers on board crashed near Zacapa shortly after take-off. The crew tried to return to the airfield after reporting technical problems. All crew and passengers survived the accident.
- 30 October 2005: Trade Air Flight 729 L-410UVP-E19A (9A-BTA) crashed a few minutes after takeoff from Bergamo-Orio Al Serio Airport on its way to Zagreb. All three on board were killed. Weather was poor with a limited visibility due to fog.
- 31 March 2006: TEAM Linhas Aéreas Flight 6865, a L-410UVP-E20 (PT-FSE), struck trees near the peak of Pico da Pedra Bonita (3.8 mi southeast of Rio Bonito) and crashed, killing all 19 people on board.
- 21 June 2007: A Karibu Airlines L-410UVP crashed after takeoff from Kamina Airport into a swamp, killing one of 22 on board. The aircraft was overloaded; the L-410 is rated to carry only 17 passengers, not 21.
- 24 September 2007: A Free Airlines L-410UVP (9Q-CVL) crashed on landing at Malemba Nkulu Airport killing one of the pilots and injuring five. The aircraft was owned by Karibu Airways.
- 8 October 2007: A Nacional de Aviación L-410UVP-E10A (HK-4055) crashed in Colombia, in the mountains near Páramo El Nevado due to pilot error, killing all 17 on board. The crew continued flying VFR in bad weather over mountainous terrain, failing to take action after the TAWS began to sound an alarm.
- 4 January 2008: A Transaven L-410UVP-E3 (YV2081) crashed near Islas Los Roques, Venezuela after the pilot reported that both engines had failed, killing all 14 on board. The aircraft itself was discovered on 20 June 2013 6 mi off the coast of Los Roques in 3200 feet of water.

== 2010s ==
- 25 August 2010: A Filair L-410UVP-E20C crashed with 20 fatalities in Bandundu, Democratic Republic of the Congo. According to the sole survivor, the crash was caused by a stampede of passengers after a crocodile escaped from a bag in the cabin. The crocodile itself survived the crash, but was killed by rescuers.
- 14 February 2011: Central American Airways Flight 731, an L-410UVP-E20 carrying 12 passengers and 2 crew members, crashed before landing at Toncontín International Airport. All passengers and crew were killed.
- 14 February 2011: An African Air Services Commuter L-410UVP (9Q-CIF) flying on behalf of the World Food Programme on a cargo flight from Kavumu Airport, Democratic Republic of the Congo to Lusenge near Kava in the Democratic Republic of the Congo, crashed into Mont Biega shortly after departure. Both crew members were killed.
- 13 July 2011: Noar Linhas Aéreas Flight 4896, an L-410UVP-E20 (PR-NOB) stalled and crashed shortly after take-off from Recife, killing all 16 occupants on board.
- 10 June 2012: A Ukrainska Shkola Pilotov (Ukrainian Pilots School) L-410UVP (UR-SKD) crashed at Borodyanka (50 km (31 mi) northwest of Kyiv). Five people were killed and thirteen injured when the pilot attempted to return to the airstrip due to an approaching storm. The aircraft was carrying 16 parachutists and two crew members. The aircraft was probably caught in a downdraft 2 km (1.2 mi) short of the runway.
- 22 August 2012: A Mombasa Air Safari L-410UVP-E9 (5Y-UVP) crashed on takeoff from Ngerende Airstrip in the Maasai Mara Game Reserve, Kenya, killing both pilots and two passengers. Nine passengers on board the aircraft received injuries of varying degree. The fuel control unit in the number two engine was contaminated, causing engine problems.
- 23 August 2014: A Doren Air Congo Let L-410UVP (9Q-CXB) performing a flight from Bukavu to Pangi (Democratic Republic Congo) with 2 passengers, 2 crew and 1500 kg of cargo, had normally departed from Bukavu's Kavumu Airport at 13:42L (11:42Z) and left the frequency of Kavumu about 10 minutes after departure. There was no further radio transmission and the aircraft did not arrive in Pangi, estimated to land about one hour after departure (approximate flying distance 140 nm), nor on any airport reachable. A search for the aircraft found the aircraft crashed and burned out in the southern vicinity of Kahuzi-Biega Park on 25 August, about 2-3 nm east of the village of Kalika in the neighbourhood of Mulume Munene.
- 30 October 2014: A Cetraca Aviation Service Let L-410UVP (9Q-CAZ) sustained substantial damage in a runway excursion accident at Butembo Airport, D.R. Congo. The fifteen passengers and three crew members survived the accident.
- 24 January 2014: A Zanair L-410UVP-E9 (5H-ZAP) skidded off the runway and into a bush while landing at Pemba Airport, Tanzania following brake failure. All 17 on board survived.
- 20 August 2015: Two Dubnica Air L-410s (OM-ODQ and OM-SAB) collided in mid-air at an altitude of around 5000 feet near Cerveny Kamen village in Slovakia, close to the Czech border. The planes were carrying skydivers, rehearsing for a nearby air show. Thirty-one skydivers survived by jumping out of the planes after the collision. Two crew members from each plane and three parachutists were killed when the planes crashed in a hilly area. Probable reason was an lack of discipline and inattention of second plane pilot, which was engaged in taking photographs of first plane flying ahead and above him.
- 27 May 2017: Summit Air Flight 409, an L-410UVP-E20 (9N-AKY) crashed while attempting to land at Tenzing-Hillary Airport, killing both pilots. Circumstances of the crash remain unclear.
- 16 August 2017: Honduran Air Force L-410UVP-E3 FAH-322 crashed into a building at Palmerola Air Base, killing the pilot.
- 15 November 2017: Khabarovsk Airlines Flight 463, an L-410UVP-E20 (RA-67047), crashed 2 km (1.2 mi) short of the runway at Nelkan Airport, Russia, killing six of seven on board. Flight recorder preliminary analysis indicates it entered a near-vertical descent after its right engine began developing reverse thrust.
- 24 June 2018: Eagle Air SA, operating a L-410UVP (3X-AAK), crashed on June 24 in bad weather in the Kindia region. The regional aircraft was transporting kerosene from Conakry. There were two technicians and two pilots bound for a mine field located near Lero, Kankan. It made an intermediate stop at Conakry on a flight from Sal, Cape Verde. En route, the crew encountered poor weather conditions with low clouds and fog when the airplane struck the slope of a mountain and disintegrated on impact. All four occupants were killed.
- 9 September 2018: A L-410UVP leased by Ukrainian carrier Slav-Air to South Sudan-based South West Aviation crashed into Lake Yirol while attempting to land in daylight (08:00) but in poor visibility at Yirol Airport after a flight from Juba. Of the twenty passengers and three crew, one crewmember and two passengers survived with serious injuries. The aircraft involved had been delivered to Aeroflot in 1984, then transferred to various operators until 2006, when it was stored at Rivne in Ukraine, then acquired by Slav-Air in April 2018 and leased since May.
- 14 April 2019: Summit Air Flight 802D, a L-410UVP-E20 (9H-AMH), crashed on takeoff from Tenzing-Hillary Airport. The aircraft was taking off from runway 24 when it veered off the runway onto the helicopter apron hitting two AS350 helicopters of Manang and Shree Air. The first officer of the flight died in the accident as well as two security officers on the ground near the helicopters.

== 2020s ==
- 13 August 2020: A Doren Air Congo L-410UVP-E3 (9S-GEN) crashed on approach to Kavumu Airport in Bukavu on a flight from Kalima. None of the two passengers and two crew on board survived. After the airplane failed to arrive at Bukavu as scheduled, a search was begun, and was initially unsuccessful due to low visibility, but wreckage was eventually found in dense forest three nautical miles west of Kavumu airport.
- 2 March 2021: A South Sudan Supreme Airlines L-410UVP-E with fake registration HK-4274, crashed while returning to Pieri, South Sudan shortly after taking off from Pieri for a flight to Yuai, South Sudan, killing all ten people on board. The airplane had suffered a loss of power in both engines before the crash.
- 16 June 2021: A Kin Avia L-410UVP-E (9S-GRJ) crashed on takeoff from Kavumu Airport in Bukavu, Democratic Republic of the Congo on a flight to Shabunda Airport in Shabunda Territory, Democratic Republic of the Congo. The three occupants of the airplane, two pilots and one passenger, were killed.
- 19 June 2021: A DOSAAF L-410UVP-E (RF-94603) crashed in a field near Tanay Airport in Kemerovo Oblast, Russia with 19 on board seven of which lost their lives. The aircraft was on a training flight with parachutists.
- 12 September 2021: Siberian Light Aviation Flight 51 (RA-67042) en route from International Airport Irkutsk in Irkutsk to Kazachinskoye Airport in Kazachinskoye, Irkutsk Oblast crashed during a forced landing in a forest about 4 kilometers from Kazachinsk after suffering a mechanical failure, killing four of the sixteen people on board.
- 10 October 2021: An L-410 (RF-94591) crashed in central Russia, killing 17. The plane belonged to DOSAAF Russia, and as with the June 2021 crash of the same aircraft type, was carrying parachutists.
- 5 May 2023: A Polish Border Guard L-410 allegedly suffered a near-loss of control while being intercepted by a Russian Air Force SU-27 Flanker over the Black Sea. The Flanker performed an "aggressive" interception on the unarmed Polish aircraft, making a very close pass of its nose, forcing the L-410 to take evasive action to avoid a collision.
- 17 March 2024: A Cetraca Aviation Service L-410UVP (9S-GBP) crashed when the aircraft went off the runway when the aircraft was caught by strong gust and blown off the runway when landing at Butembo Airport and came to a stop when the right gear collapsed as well as damages to the right wing and the horizontal stabilizer.
- 25 November 2025: A Nari Air L-410UVP (AVIONS-416), operating for Samaritan's Purse, crashed during approach, killing all three crew members on board.
- 25 September 2026: A Tracep L-410 that had taken off from Kikwit crashed in Kenge, killing the 17 people on board, including various high-ranking military officials.
