= West Caribbean Airways Flight 9955 =

2005 aviation accident

- Wreckage from flight 9955

Accident
- Date: 26 March 2005
- Summary: Stalled shortly after take-off due to engine flameout
- Site: El Embrujo Airport, Colombia; 13°21′21″N 81°21′45″W

Aircraft
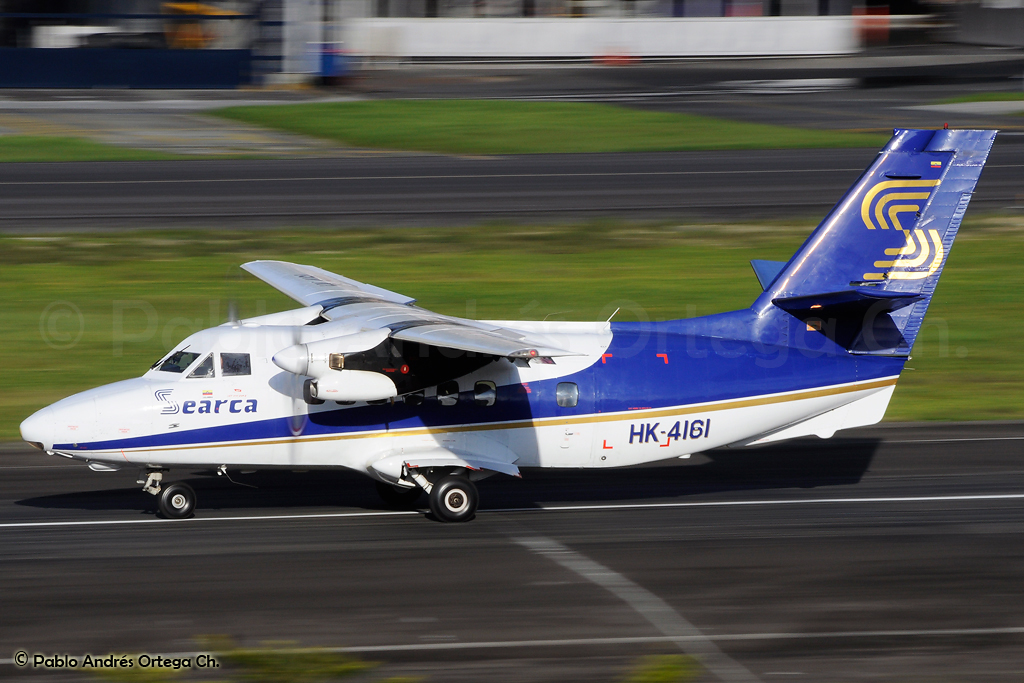
- A L-410 Turbolet similar to the accident aircraft
- Aircraft type: Let L-410UVP-E
- Operator: West Caribbean Airways
- IATA flight No.: YH9955
- ICAO flight No.: WCW9955
- Call sign: WEST CARIBBEAN 9955
- Registration: HK-4146
- Flight origin: El Embrujo Airport
- Destination: Gustavo Rojas Pinilla International Airport
- Occupants: 14
- Passengers: 12
- Crew: 2
- Fatalities: 9
- Injuries: 5
- Survivors: 5

West Caribbean Airways Flight 9955 was a scheduled flight between Isla de Providencia and San Andres Island, Colombia that crashed on 26 March 2005, killing 9 of the 14 passengers and crew on board. It was the first fatal crash in West Caribbean Airways history.

== Background ==
=== Aircraft ===
The aircraft involved was a Let L-410UVP-E built in 1990. At the time of the accident the aircraft was approximately 15 years old and had accumulated 6,901 flight hours.

=== Crew ===
The captain, Rodolfo Blanco Martínez, age 42, had a total of 6,038 flying hours, including 145 hours on the Let L-410 type. He had also flown the much smaller Piper PA-34 Seneca.

The copilot, Edwin Dagoberto Giraldo Florez, age 26, had 868 total flying hours, with 653 hours on type.

=== Passengers ===
According to a statement from West Caribbean Airways, the occupants of the aircraft were:

==== Fatalities ====
- José Toro
- Sandra Blanco
- Maritza Murcia
- Patricia Tabares
- Alejandro Charles
- Jacqueline Brenes
- Indira Arellano
- Consuelo Moncano
- Joseph Blombom (initially survived but later died due to injuries)

==== Survivors ====
- María Moncano
- Juanita Toro
- Indira Medrano
- Ricardo Pardo
- Angie Smith

== Accident ==
The aircraft, a Let L-410UVP-E, had just taken off from El Embrujo Airport at 9:50. When the plane was in its takeoff roll, the left engine flamed out, but the crew continued the takeoff. When the plane reached approximately 300 feet in height, the speed of the aircraft decreased rapidly, and it banked too far to the right and stalled. The aircraft crashed into a mangrove forest, located just 113 metres (371 ft) from the airport runway.

Both pilots and 7 of the 12 passengers were killed in the crash. One passenger, who had initially survived the crash, succumbed to his injuries shortly after being rescued. The survivors were taken to Hospital Clarence Lynd Newball Memorial, San Andrés and Bogotá. Providencia Island was experiencing increased activity due to the Christian Holy Week holidays at the time of the accident.

== Aftermath ==
Aerocivil stated that the sanctions imposed on West Caribbean Airways were unrelated to any deficiencies in the airline's operational safety, noting that the airline met the safety standards required by the Colombian aviation authority and was therefore permitted to continue operating.

== See also ==
- West Caribbean Airways Flight 708
- List of accidents and incidents involving the Let L-410 Turbolet
