= West Caribbean Airways =

Colombian airline (1998-2005)

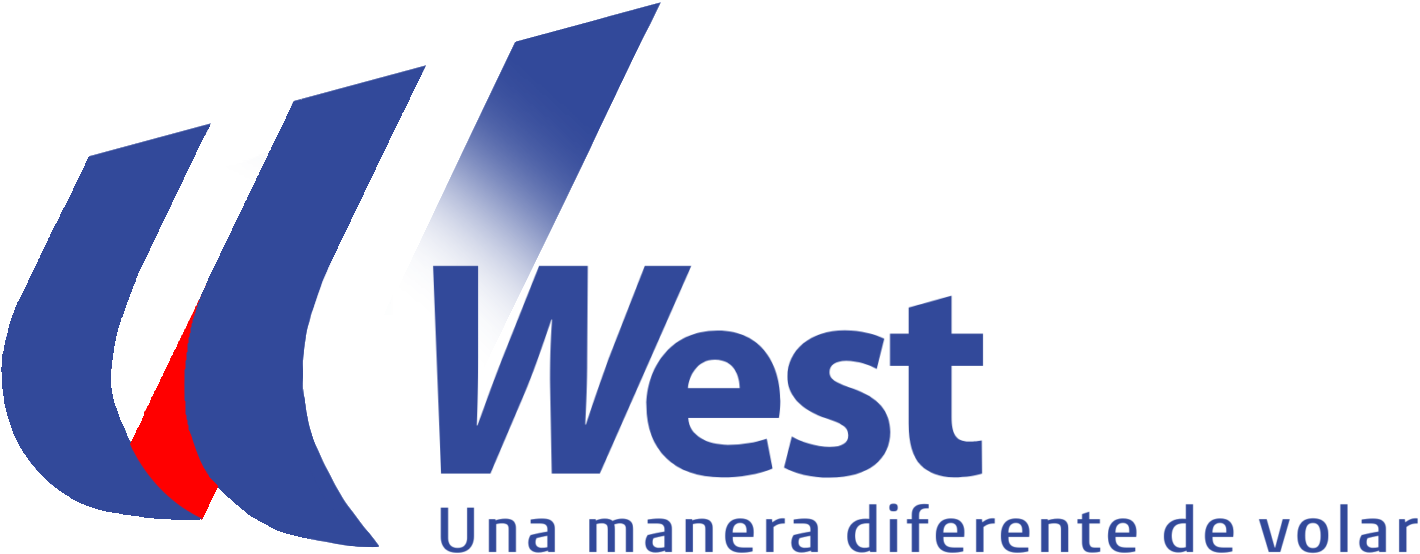

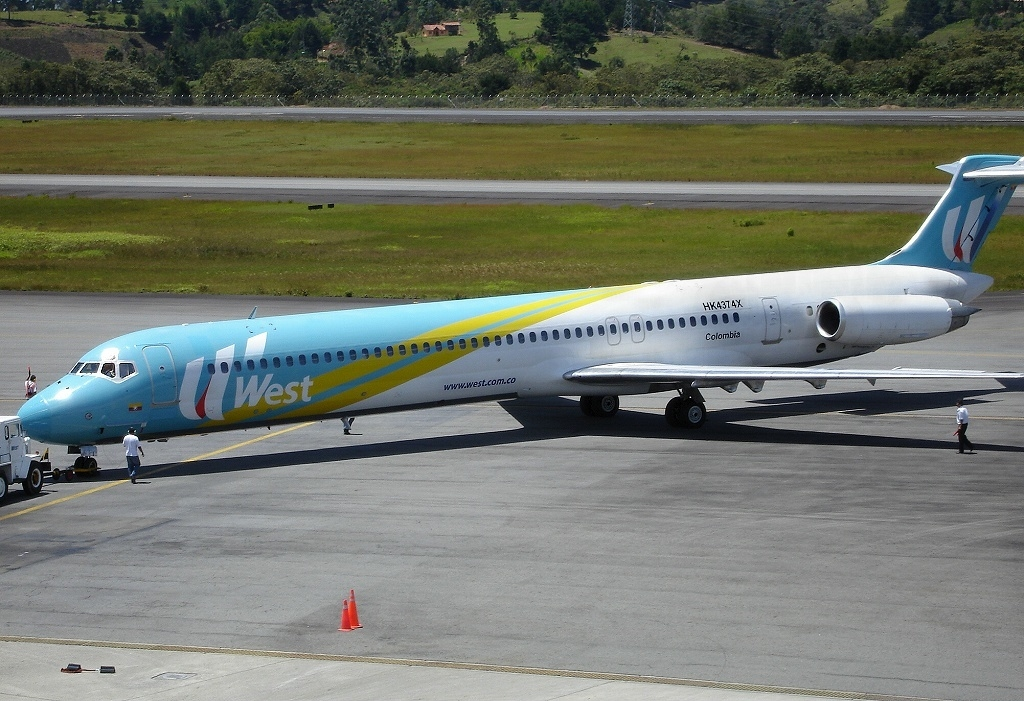
IATA	ICAO	Call sign
YH	WCW	WEST CARIBBEAN
- Founded: 29 December 1998; 27 years ago
- Commenced operations: 13 November 1999; 26 years ago
- Ceased operations: 6 September 2005; 21 years ago
- Hubs: José María Córdova International Airport
- Secondary hubs: El Dorado International Airport
- Subsidiaries: West Caribbean Aruba; West Caribbean Costa Rica
- Fleet size: 16
- Destinations: 25
- Parent company: Heliandes (48%)
- Headquarters: Cra. 67 #1b-15, Olaya Herrera Airport, Medellín, Colombia
- Key people: Jorge Enrique Pérez Ruiz (CEO)
- Founder: Hassan Tannir
- Employees: 500 (As of mid-2005)
- Website: Wca.com.co

West Caribbean Airways S.A. (abbreviated as WCA, also referred and stylized as just West) was a Colombian airline founded in December 1998 with its headquarters at Olaya Herrera Airport in Medellín, after moving there from San Andres Island in 2001. It began operating in November 1999. It suffered a fatal crash in August 2005 (a few months after an earlier fatal crash), which led to its declaration of bankruptcy on 6 September 2005 and liquidation on 7 June 2007.

== History ==
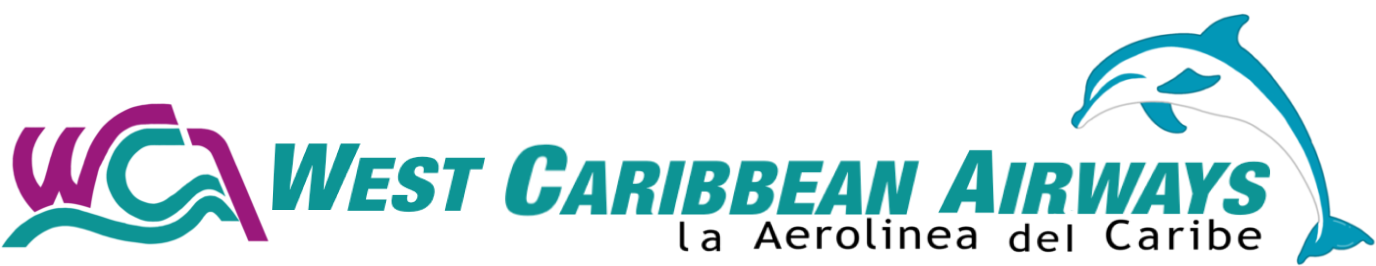
Former logo used since December 1998 until January 2005.

The company was founded on 29 December 1998, by Colombian businessman Hassan Tannir and began operations on 13 November 1999. Originally based in San Andrés, it began operations as a charter with four Let L-410 Turbolets that served San Andrés and Providencia Island as the first destinations.

In 2000, West Caribbean Airways added flights to Cartagena, Monteria, and Barranquilla with leased ATR 42s and also expanded to international routes to Varadero, Cuba; Panama City, Panama; and San Jose, Costa Rica. The next year, a group of investors acquired the airline and relocated its headquarters to Medellín. This put it in competition with ACES and Avianca.

The airline expanded very rapidly and acquired two McDonnell Douglas MD-80s, which operated various international and regional routes.

By 2005, serious financial and procedural problems were evident at West Caribbean Airways. It posted $6 million in losses in 2004. In January, the airline was fined $45,000 by Colombia's civil aeronautics government agency, UAEAC, for 14 safety violations, including lack of training for pilots, pilots flying too many flight hours, and flight data not being properly logged in.

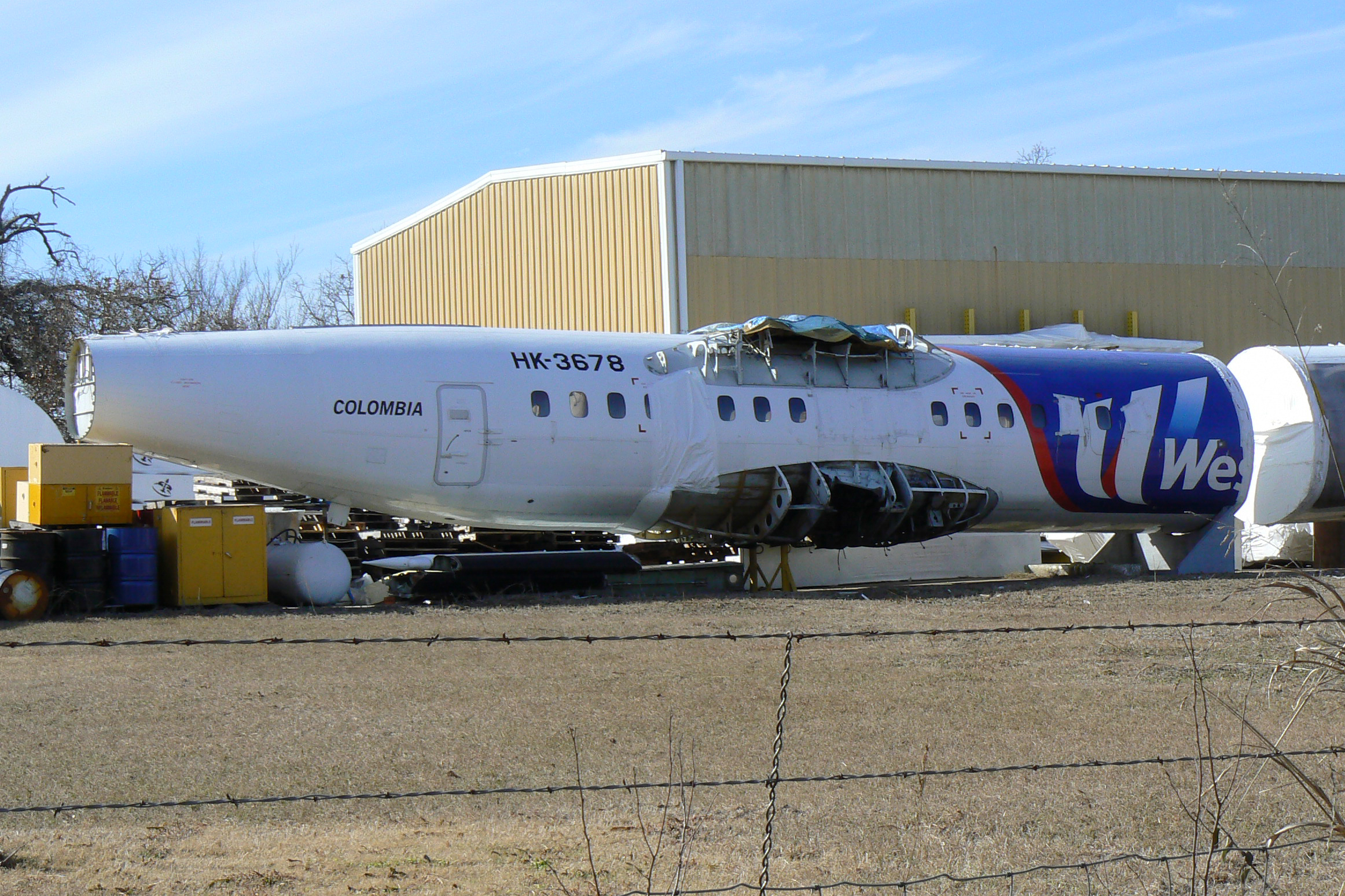
A scrapped ATR 42-320 seen at Johnson County, Texas in 2011 following the airline's accident

A few months later, on 25 March 2005, Flight 9955 crashed on takeoff, killing 9 of the 14 passengers on board. This accident brought further scrutiny by UAEAC. Due to its 2004 losses, the civil aviation authority began close monitoring of West Caribbean Airways's finances in May, though it was stated that the airline was fulfilling its commitments.

Just 3 months later, on 16 August 2005, Flight 708 crashed in Venezuela, killing all 160 on board. By the time of this accident, WCA had only four aircraft left in its fleet: a Let L-410, two undergoing maintenance, and the aircraft destroyed in Flight 708. West Caribbean Airways was grounded by the UAEAC late in the day on 17 August.

Operations ended in September 2005, when the airline could no longer sustain them. A month later, the airline staff indicated to passengers that the airline would remain on the ground due to the poor economic conditions and that it could not meet its financial obligations. The airline's operating licence was formally revoked by the UAEAC on 17 October 2006.

== Subsidiaries ==
=== West Caribbean Aruba ===
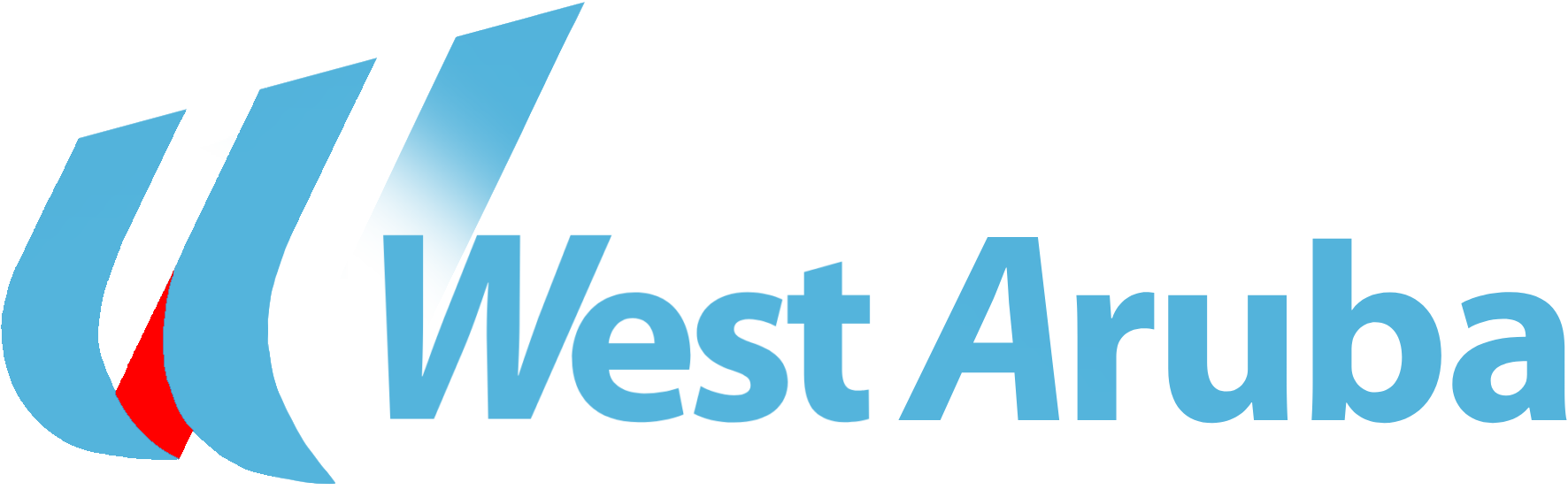

West Caribbean Airways Aruba N.V. (ICAO: WAU, call sign: WEST ARUBA) was a planned low-cost carrier based in Aruba. It was founded on 23 August 2004. The parent company was negotiating to utilize Aruba as its main hub for growth across the Americas, including the United States, with recruitment of local pilots and cabin crew for MD‑80 operations to position itself ahead of regional competitors by quickly entering countries with open-skies agreements. The airline was planned to commenced operation on 18 March – 29 April 2005. However, it became several delayed and abandoned until it dissolved on 1 June 2006.

=== West Caribbean Costa Rica ===
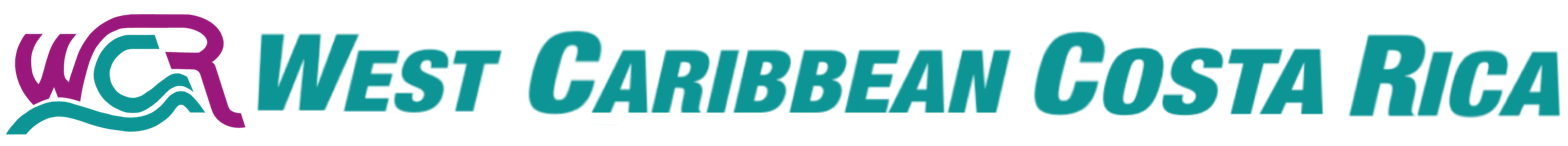

West Caribbean Costa Rica S.A. (IATA: 0W, ICAO: WCR, call sign: WEST CARIBBEAN) was a regional airline based in Costa Rica It was founded on 4 October 2002 and commenced flight operations on 15 December 2003 with 20% stake equity by its parent company, which had accumulated approximately US$6 million in debt—equivalent to owing 97 cents for every dollar earned.

== Destinations ==
West Caribbean Airways operated the following services:

Brazil

- Manaus (Eduardo Gomes International Airport)

Colombia

- Apartadó (Antonio Roldán Betancourt Airport)
- Armenia (El Edén International Airport)
- Barranquilla (Ernesto Cortissoz International Airport)
- Bogotá (El Dorado International Airport) Hub
- Cali (Alfonso Bonilla Aragón International Airport)
- Cartagena (Rafael Núñez International Airport)
- Caucasia (Juan H. White Airport)
- Chigorodó (Jaime Ortiz Betancur Airport)
- Cúcuta (Camilo Daza International Airport)
- El Bagre (El Bagre Airport)
- Manizales (La Nubia Airport)
- Medellín (José María Córdova International Airport) Hub
- Medellín (Olaya Herrera Airport)
- Montería (Los Garzones Airport)
- Otú (Otú Airport)
- Providencia (El Embrujo Airport)
- Puerto Berrío (Morela Airport)
- Quibdó (El Caraño Airport)
- San Andrés (Gustavo Rojas Pinilla International Airport)
- Tolú (Golfo de Morrosquillo Airport)
- Turbo (Gonzalo Mejía Airport)
- Urrao (Urrao Airport)

Costa Rica

- San José (Juan Santamaría International Airport)

Dominican Republic

- Santo Domingo (Las Américas International Airport)

Florida, U.S.

- Fort Lauderdale (Fort Lauderdale–Hollywood International Airport)
- Miami (Miami International Airport)

Guatemala

- Guatemala City (La Aurora International Airport)

Honduras

- Tegucigalpa (Toncontín International Airport)

Netherlands Antilles

- Aruba (Queen Beatrix International Airport)
- Curaçao (Curaçao International Airport)
- Sint Maarten (Princess Juliana International Airport)

Nicaragua

- Managua (Augusto C. Sandino International Airport)

Panama

- Panama City (Tocumen International Airport)

Venezuela

- Caracas (Simón Bolívar International Airport)

== Fleet ==
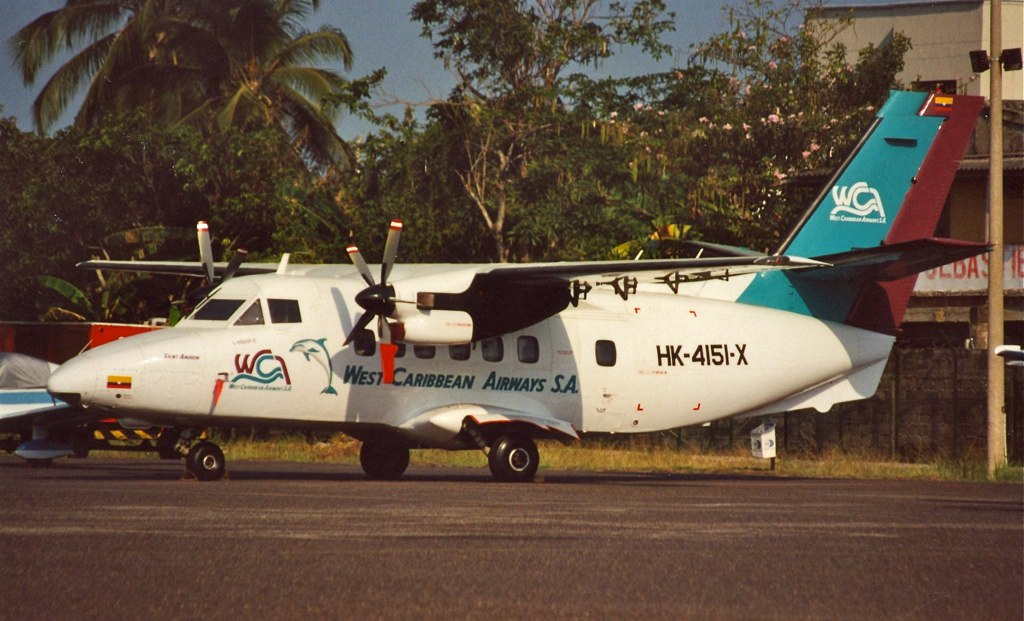
A West Caribbean Let L-410UVP-E on original livery in February 2001.

The West Caribbean Airways fleet consisted of the following aircraft:

West Caribbean Airways fleet
Aircraft	Total	Introduced	Retired	Notes
ATR 42-300	1	2000	2005	Leased to West Caribbean Costa Rica
ATR 42-320	4	2001	2005	
Let L-410 UVP-E	8	1999	2005	One crashed as Flight 9955
McDonnell Douglas MD-81	1	2003	2005	
McDonnell Douglas MD-82	2	2003	2005	
McDonnell Douglas MD-82	2	2005	2005	Crashed as Flight 708

== Accidents and incidents ==
- On 26 March 2005, West Caribbean Airways Flight 9955, a Let L-410 Turbolet (registered HK-4146), on departure from El Embrujo, Isla de Providencia failed to climb and hit hills close to the runway, killing the two crew and six of the twelve passengers. Initial reports suggested a technical fault.
- On 16 August 2005, West Caribbean Airways Flight 708, a chartered McDonnell Douglas MD-82 (registered HK-4374X) heading from Panama to Martinique in the Caribbean, crashed in remote western Venezuela due to human errors, killing all 160 aboard, mostly French nationals from Martinique.

== See also ==
- List of airlines of Colombia
