= Sakha Avia Flight 301 =

1993 aviation accident

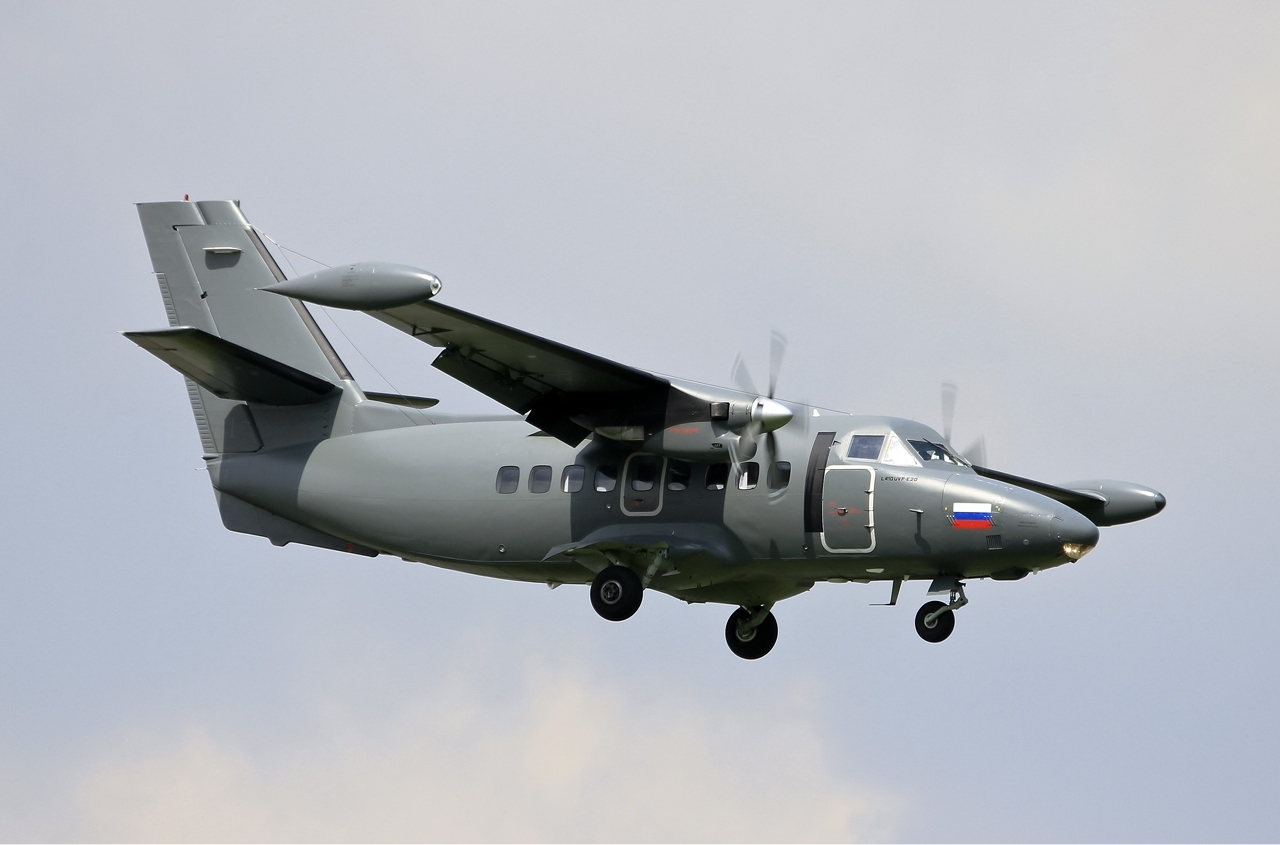
- A Let L-410 Turbolet similar to the aircraft involved

Accident
- Date: 26 August 1993
- Summary: Crashed on approach due to overloading of aircraft
- Site: Near Aldan Airport, Russia

Aircraft
- Aircraft type: Let L-410 Turbolet
- Operator: Sakha Avia
- IATA flight No.: K7301
- ICAO flight No.: SKH301
- Call sign: SAKHAAVIA 301
- Registration: RA-67656
- Flight origin: Kutana Airport
- Stopover: Uchur Airport
- Destination: Aldan Airport
- Occupants: 24
- Passengers: 22
- Crew: 2
- Fatalities: 24
- Survivors: 0

Sakha Avia Flight 301 was a scheduled domestic passenger flight from Kutana to Aldan via Uchur in Russia. On 26 August 1993 the Let L-410 Turbolet operating the flight crashed on approach to Aldan Airport, killing all 24 people on board. It is the deadliest aviation disaster involving the Let L-410 Turbolet.

== Accident ==
The aircraft was on final approach to Aldan Airport. The flaps were extended for landing, however, when this happened, the aircraft abruptly pitched up to 40 degrees, stalled and crashed into the ground 896 feet (273 m) from the runway. All 24 people on board were killed.

== Aircraft ==
The aircraft involved was a three-year-old L-410UVP-E (registration RA-67656) which first flew in 1990. The aircraft was powered by two Walter M-601E engines.

== Investigation ==
The investigation determined that the aircraft was overloaded, moving the center of gravity to the rear.

== See also ==
- List of accidents and incidents involving the Let L-410 Turbolet
