= Heliandes =

Helicopter Colombian airline

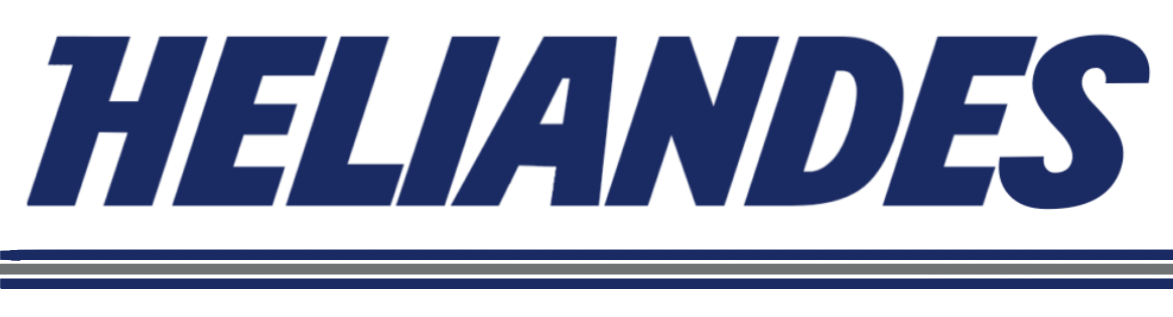
- Founded: 1998
- Commenced operations: 2004
- Ceased operations: 2007
- Operating bases: Olaya Herrera Airport
- Subsidiaries: West Caribbean Airways (48%)
- Fleet size: 4
- Headquarters: Medellín, Colombia
- Employees: 50 (as of mid-2006)

Heliandes S.A. was a passenger and freight charter airline specialising in fixed-wing and helicopter operations, based at Olaya Herrera Airport, Medellín, Colombia. The airline was established in 1998 and started operations in 2004. Following the crash of West Caribbean Airways Flight 708, Heliandes went into liquidation on June 7, 2007.

== Fleet ==
The Heliandes fleet includes the following aircraft:

- 4 Let L-410 UVP-E
- 3 Mil Mi-17

== Accidents and incidents ==
- On December 16, 2001, a Let L-410 (registered HK-4175X) crashed into a hillside just after takeoff from Olaya Herrera Airport. All 16 occupants were killed. According to the incident report, the cause was a failure to follow standard company procedures or the approved flight plan, combined with the formation of cumulus clouds, making visual operations difficult.
- On July 21, 2006, a Mil Mi-8MTV-1 (registered HK-4164) crashed out of control en route from Orito to Puente Onco. The cause, according to the accident report, was a potential lack of proper maintenance of the aircraft. All 5 occupants were killed.

== See also ==
- List of airlines of Colombia
