= Červený Kameň =

- Municipality
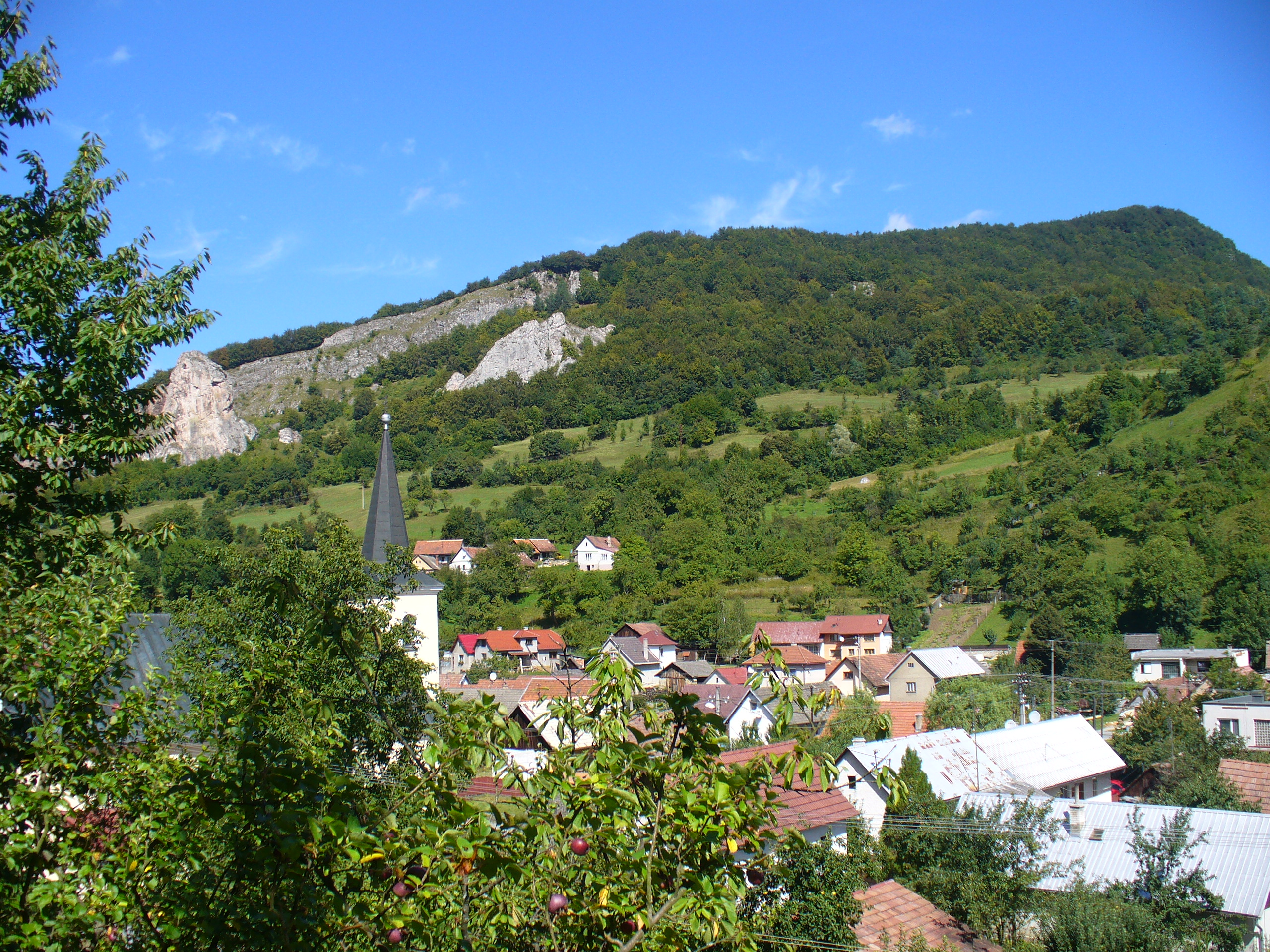

- Flag Coat of arms

- Location of Červený Kameň in the Trenčín Region Location of Červený Kameň in Slovakia
- Coordinates: 49.08°N 18.18°E
- Country: Slovakia
- Region: Trenčín Region
- District: Ilava District
- First mentioned: 1354

Area
  - Total: 32.59 km^{2} (12.58 sq mi)
- Elevation: 357 m (1,171 ft)

Population (2025)
  - Total: 628
- Time zone: UTC+1 (CET)
  - Summer (DST): UTC+2 (CEST)
- Postal code: 185 6
- Area code: +421 42
- Vehicle registration plate (until 2022): IL
- Website: www.cervenykamen.sk

Červený Kameň (Hungarian: Vöröskő) is a village and municipality in Ilava District in the Trenčín Region of north-western Slovakia.

== Etymology ==
Both Slovak and Hungarian names mean "red stone". The first written mention about the village is "possesio seu willa Wewreskew" (1439). Cherweny Kamen (1484) later also Rothenstein (1808).

== History ==
In historical records the village was first mentioned in 1439. On 20 August 2015, two planes collided over the village. All 7 people on board were killed but the other 31 parachists jumped before both aircraft crashed.

== Geography ==
The municipality lies at an altitude of 357 metres (1,171 ft) and covers an area of 32.59 km^{2} (12.58 sq mi) (2025).

== Population ==
Population statistic (10 years)
| Year | 1995 | 2005 | 2015 | 2025 |
|---|---|---|---|---|
| Count | 803 | 750 | 683 | 628 |
| Difference | | −6.60% | −8.93% | −8.05% |

Population statistic
| Year | 2024 | 2025 |
|---|---|---|
| Count | 639 | 628 |
| Difference | | −1.72% |

It has a population of 628 people (31 December 2025).

=== Ethnicity ===
Census 2021 (1+ %)
| Ethnicity | Number | Fraction |
|---|---|---|
| Slovak | 644 | 96.11% |
| Not found out | 15 | 2.23% |
| Czech | 14 | 2.08% |
| Total | 670 | |

In year 2021 was 670 people by ethnicity 644 as Slovak, 15 as Not found out, 14 as Czech, 3 as Other, 2 as Romani, 2 as Moravian and 1 as Romanian.

Note on population: The difference values of population numbers in the table "Population statistic" and in the sections "Ethnicity" & "Religion" is caused by the use of various statistical methods.

=== Religion ===
Census 2021 (1+ %)
| Religion | Number | Fraction |
|---|---|---|
| Roman Catholic Church | 579 | 86.42% |
| None | 58 | 8.66% |
| Not found out | 14 | 2.09% |
| Total | 670 | |

In year 2021 was 670 people by religion 579 from Roman Catholic Church, 58 from None, 14 from Not found out, 5 from Ad hoc movements, 4 from Paganism and natural spirituality, 4 from Evangelical Church, 3 from Christian Congregations in Slovakia, 2 from Other and 1 from Other and not ascertained christian church.

== Genealogical resources ==
The records for genealogical research are available at the state archive "Statny Archiv in Bytca, Slovakia"

- Roman Catholic church records (births/marriages/deaths): 1671-1896 (parish A)

== See also ==
- List of municipalities and towns in Slovakia
