= Iberian capture of Providencia =

Coordinates: 12°33′N 81°43′W

Spanish and Portuguese capture of Providencia
- Part of the Piracy in the Caribbean
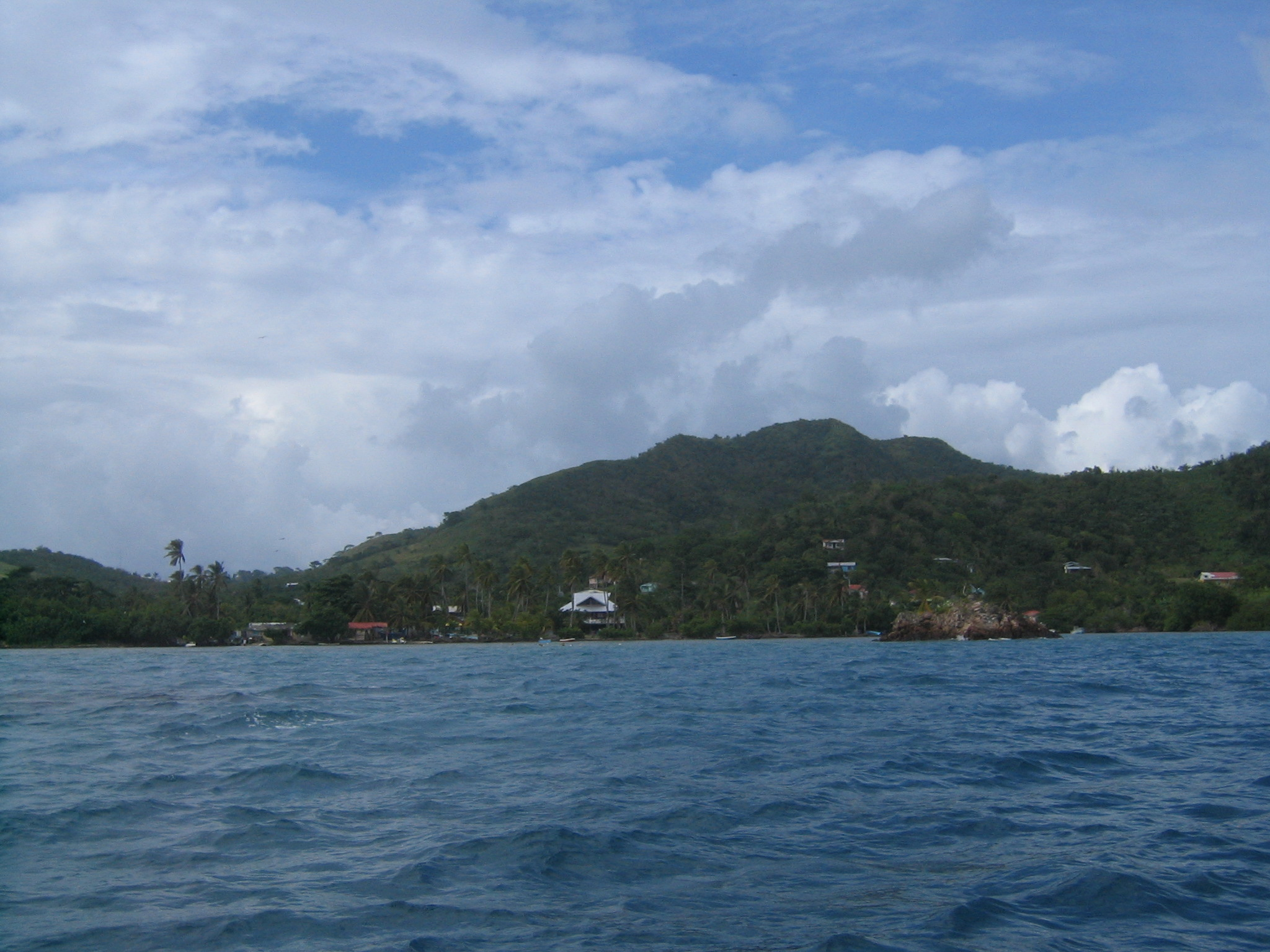
- View of Providencia Island.
Date	17 May 1641
Location	Providencia Island, San Andrés y Providencia (present-day Colombia)
Result	Spanish & Portuguese victory

Belligerents
(Spain) Spanish Empire; Portuguese Empire	(Kingdom of England) Providence Island colony

Commanders and leaders
(Spain) Francisco Díaz Pimienta (Portuguese Empire) João Rodrigues de Vasconcelos e Sousa	(Kingdom of England) Andrew Carter

Strength
1,400 soldiers 600 sailors 10 ships	600 men

Casualties and losses
Minimum	770 prisoners 380 enslaved African & Indigenous; 40 guns

The Spanish and Portuguese conquest of Providencia took place on 17 May 1641 and was an amphibious expedition against the Piracy in the Caribbean in order to seize the island from its English settlers' control. The Spanish and Portuguese fleet carrying 2,000 men captured the island and took so much gold and slaves that the value of the plunder was estimated at above half a million ducats.

== Background ==
Determined to expel the English, the Spanish crown ordered veteran Admiral Don Francisco Díaz Pimienta to take his battle fleet to expunge the intruder settlement. Díaz Pimienta, along with the Portuguese Count of Castel-Melhor João Rodrigues de Vasconcelos e Sousa, appeared off Providencia Island with his 400- ton flagship San Juan; the 800-ton, foreign-built viceflag Sansón under Jerónimo de Ojeda; the 400-ton galleons Jesús María del Castillo and San Marcos; the 300-ton ships Santa Ana, Teatina, and Comboy; the auxiliary San Pedro; and three lesser craft of 70–80 tons apiece. The expedition bears a total of 600 sailors and 1,400 soldiers.

== Action ==
The attackers were again stymied by Providencia’s reefs, spending several days searching for a safe landing place. On 19 May San Marcos struck an outcropping and was severely damaged; retiring toward Cartagena, taking 270 troops and one-third of the Spanish siege train. Díaz Pimienta eventually decided to make a thrust directly into the main English harbor at dawn on 24 May with 1,200 men, hoping to catch his enemy offguard.

The gamble paid off: Spanish and Portuguese troops waded through the surf and stormed the intricate system of English trenches and parapets with cold steel. The defenders were driven back within their keep, and the Spanish and Portuguese manhandled English artillery pieces into new emplacements to open up a close-range bombardment.

At this point, Providencia’s residents sent out two flags of truce, requesting terms. The next day (25 May), Díaz Pimienta and João Rodrigues de Vasconcelos e Sousa accepted the surrender of the fort along with 40 guns, 380 slaves, and all English goods on the island. The 770 inhabitants surrendered on the understanding they would be repatriated to Europe; the Spanish commander-in-chief installed a new garrison under Vice Admiral de Ojeda. The Spanish and Portuguese fleet then prepared to weigh, except for the Portuguese Ajuda, which attempted to sail for Portugal in order to aid their comrades in the new fight to restore full sovereignty to Portugal from Spanish control. Instead, the ship was wrecked on Providencia’s reefs. Furious, Díaz Pimienta ordered two of its officers shot and their bodies displayed on the twisted wreckage as a warning to others.

== Aftermath ==
The victorious Spanish admiral was accorded a hero’s welcome at Cartagena de Indias, later being awarded with a knighthood in the Order of Santiago. The vast majority of the English prisoners were sent back to England.
