= 2015 Červený Kameň mid-air collision =

Aviation accident in Slovakia

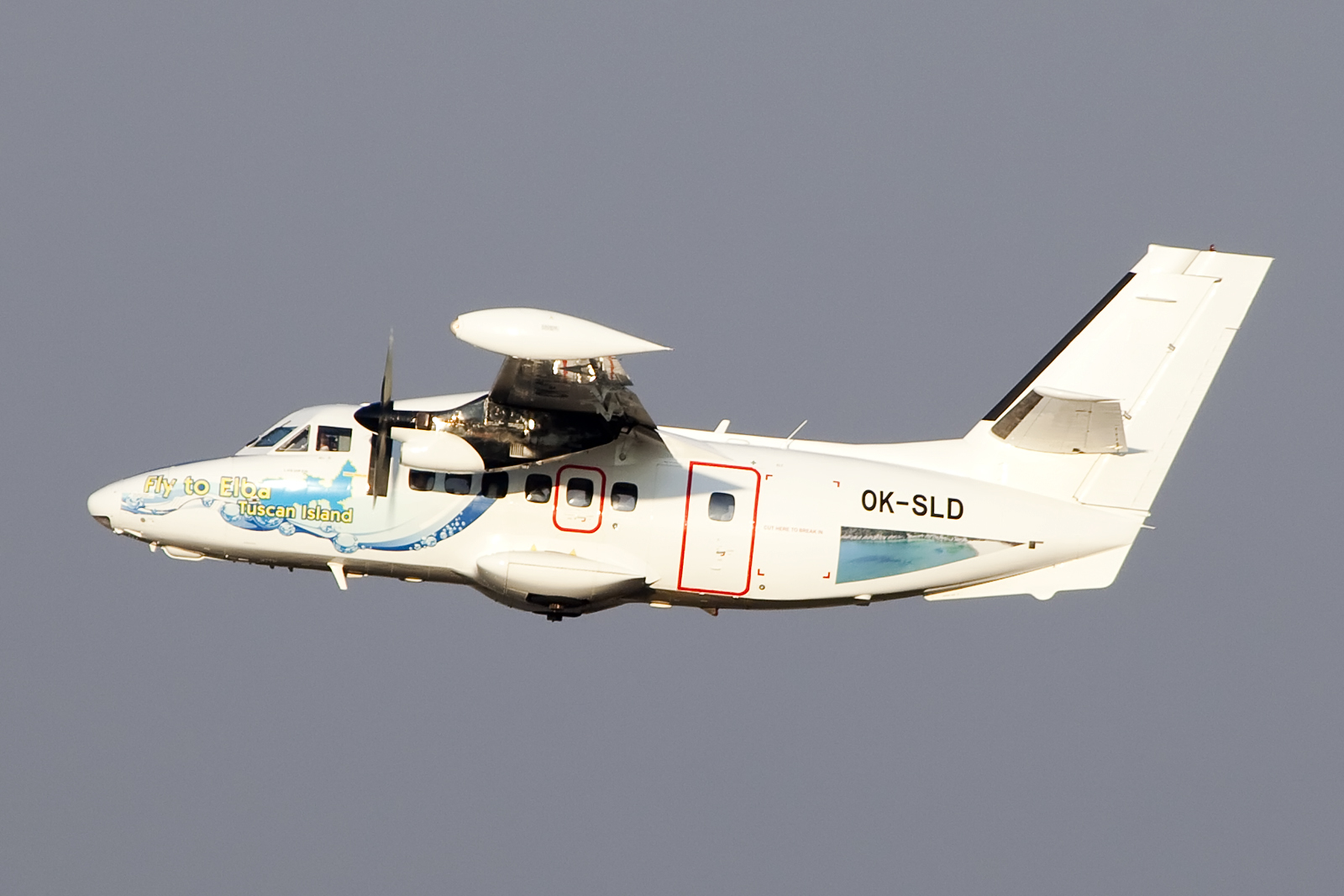
- A Let L-410 similar to the two aircraft involved

Accident
- Date: 20 August 2015
- Summary: Mid-air collision, pilot error
- Site: Over Červený Kameň, Slovakia
- Total fatalities: 7
- Total survivors: 31

First aircraft
- Type: Let L-410MA
- Operator: Dubnica Air
- Registration: OM-SAB
- Flight origin: Slávnica airport, Slovakia
- Occupants: 19
- Passengers: 17
- Crew: 2
- Fatalities: 3
- Survivors: 16

Second aircraft
- Type: Let L-410UVP
- Operator: Dubnica Air
- Registration: OM-ODQ
- Flight origin: Slávnica airport, Slovakia
- Occupants: 19
- Passengers: 17
- Crew: 2
- Fatalities: 4
- Survivors: 15

On 20 August 2015, two L-410 Turbolet aircraft on a skydiving formation flight collided mid-air and crashed near the village of Červený Kameň, Slovakia. The aircraft were carrying 17 parachutists and 2 crew each. All four crew members and three skydivers were killed, but the other 31 parachutists managed to jump safely before the aircraft crashed to the ground.

== Aircraft ==
The two aircraft involved were both twin-turboprop L-410 (registrations OM-SAB and OM-ODQ) operated by Dubnica Air.

== Accident ==
On 20 August 2015 at 9:23 (local time), the two aircraft collided and crashed in a forest near Červený Kameň in the district of Ilava, north-western Slovakia. Both aircraft were carrying parachutists who were training for the Slavnica 2015 Air Show. Both aircraft came down in a wooded area after they hit each other at an altitude of around 1,500 m (4,900 ft) under unknown circumstances. All four crew members, two from each aircraft, and three parachutists were killed, but 31 others survived by jumping out of the aircraft. Five of the parachutists were treated for minor injuries. There was a video shot showing that OM-SAB was consumed by fire.

The wreckage of the two aircraft was difficult to access due to the forest terrain near the village where they were found. All victims of the disaster were of Slovakian nationality. One of the crew members was a former Slovak ice hockey player Michal Česnek.
