= West Caribbean Airways Flight 708 =

2005 aviation accident in Venezuela

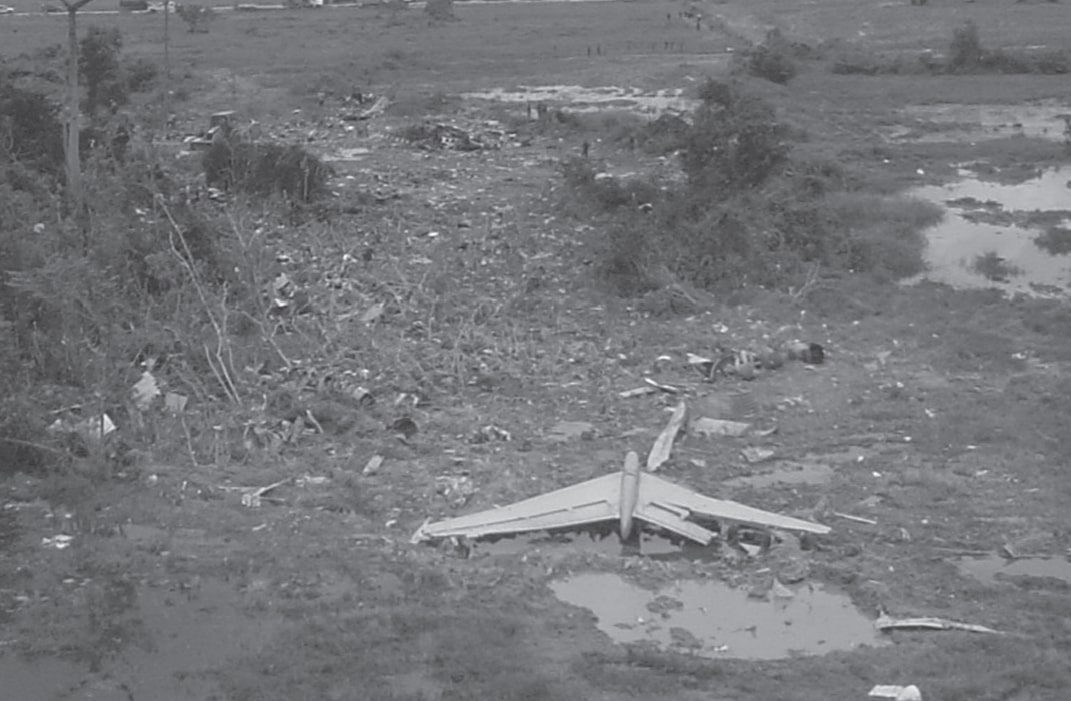
- Wreckage of the aircraft's horizontal stabilizer

Accident
- Date: 16 August 2005
- Summary: Deep stall due to pilot error
- Site: Near Campo Bernal, Machiques, Zulia, Venezuela; 9°39′59″N 72°36′40″W

Aircraft
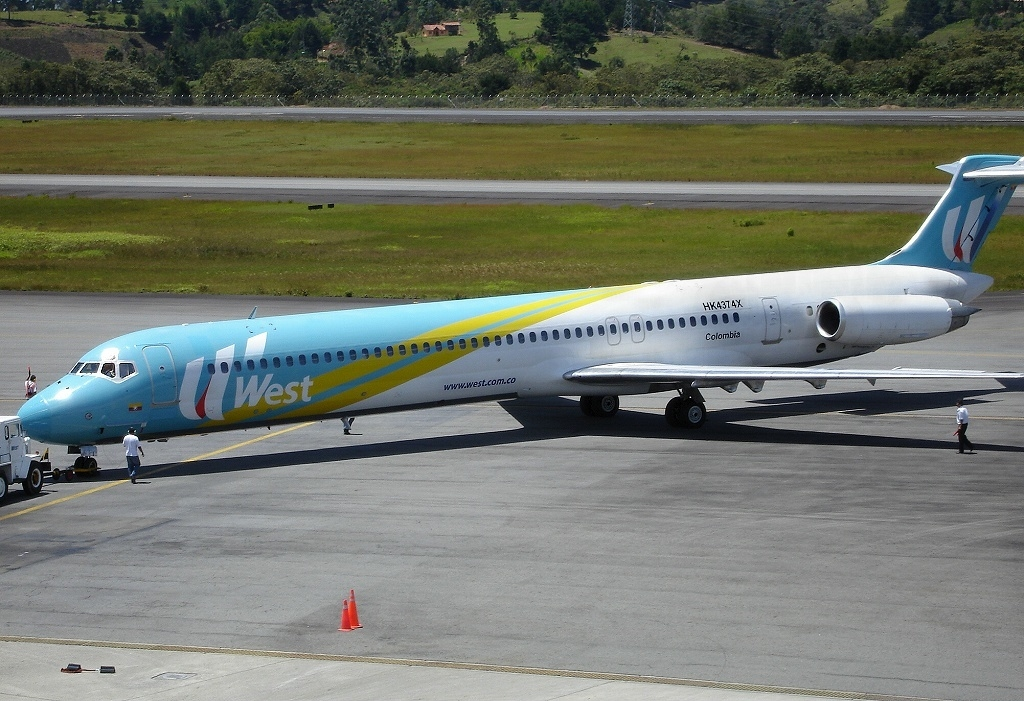
- HK-4374X, the aircraft involved, seen 20 days before the accident
- Aircraft type: McDonnell Douglas MD-82
- Operator: West Caribbean Airways
- IATA flight No.: YH708
- ICAO flight No.: WCW708
- Call sign: WEST CARIBBEAN 708
- Registration: HK-4374X
- Flight origin: Tocumen International Airport, Panama
- Destination: Martinique Aimé Césaire Int'l Airport, Martinique
- Occupants: 160
- Passengers: 152
- Crew: 8
- Fatalities: 160
- Survivors: 0

West Caribbean Airways Flight 708 was a charter flight that crashed in northwest Venezuela in the early hours of 16 August 2005, killing all 160 passengers and crew on board. The plane, a McDonnell Douglas MD-82, registration HK-4374X, was en route from Tocumen International Airport (PTY) in Panama City, Panama, to Martinique Aimé Césaire International Airport in Fort-de-France, Martinique. While flying at 33,000 ft (10,000 m), the aircraft's speed gradually decreased until it entered an aerodynamic stall. The crew, probably under the mistaken belief that the aircraft had suffered a double engine flameout, did not take the necessary actions to recover from the stall. The confusion and lack of action resulted in the crash.

The death toll made the accident the deadliest of 2005, as well as the deadliest aviation disaster to occur in Venezuela, and the second deadliest involving a McDonnell Douglas MD-80 series after Inex-Adria Aviopromet Flight 1308.

== Background ==
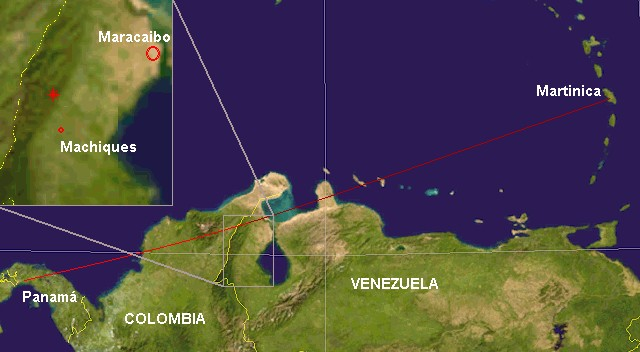
The flight's intended route and the crash site's location

West Caribbean Airways started as a charter airline in 1998, based at Medellin, Colombia. It specialized in flights to the island of San Andrés in the Caribbean, parts of the Colombian mainland, and Central America. A few months before the accident, the airline had been fined $46,000 for lack of pilot training and failure to log required flight data. The airline had experienced a previous fatal accident in March 2005.

The aircraft involved in the accident was a McDonnell Douglas MD-82, manufactured in 1986 and sold to West Caribbean on 10 January 2005.

The captain of flight 708 was 40-year-old Omar Ospina, and the first officer was 21-year-old David Muñoz. The captain had 5,942 hours of flight experience (including 1,128 hours on the MD-82), and the first officer 1,341 hours, with 862 of them on the MD-82.

Nationality	Passengers	Crew	Total
France	151	—	151
Italy	1	—	1
Colombia	—	8	8
Total	152	8	160

All the passengers were French citizens from Martinique, with the exception of one Italian, acting as the tour operator. All the crew members were Colombian. The flight was chartered by the Globe Trotters de Rivière Salée travel agency in Martinique. Most of the passengers were tourists returning from a week's vacation in Panama.

== Accident ==
Flight 708 took off from Tocumen International Airport at 00:58 local time (05:58 UTC). It climbed initially to flight level 310 (31,000 feet or 9,400 metres). At 01:39, the pilots were cleared to climb from 31,000 to 33,000 feet. The aircraft reached FL 330 (nominally 33,000 feet or 10,000 metres) at 01:44.

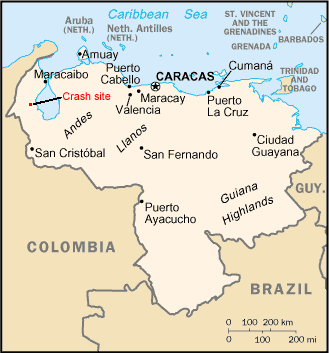
Location of the crash site

Five minutes later, the crew turned the aircraft's anti-icing systems back on (having turned them off during the final part of the climb). The system uses bleed air from the engines, and this reduces the thrust they can produce. With the anti-ice system on, the highest altitude at which the aircraft could maintain level flight was reduced to 31,900 ft (9,700 m). The aircraft was being flown too high for its weight and the icing conditions it faced.

=== Weather conditions ===
A thunderstorm cloud was passing the route in the flight plan so they had to climb up to avoid the severe thunderstorms. The captain noticed the reduction in engine output, but he did not realize the source of the problem, so he started a rapid descent as a precaution. At that time, the airspeed was already near stall speed, and the autopilot had already compensated with a nose-up attitude (angle of attack, or AOA) of 5.8° in an effort to maintain a constant altitude. West Caribbean, like all owners of the MD-82, had received an operation bulletin from the plane's manufacturer three years earlier, warning that the autopilot could try to compensate for inadequate speed, even allowing the speed to continue to drop towards a stall situation, without sending a warning or disconnecting; the bulletin advised pilots simply to monitor airspeed during autopilot level flight, but West Caribbean had not shared this bulletin with its pilots.

Already approaching a stall condition in severe thunderstorms, the airliner was pummeled by sudden turbulence, reducing the airflow into the intakes of the engines, which reduced thrust even more and the aircraft stalled. Although the first officer correctly diagnosed the situation as a stall and attempted twice to communicate this to the captain, the captain was likely confused by the unusual behavior of the engines due to the anti-ice system and probably the airflow disruption. The captain instead believed they were dealing with an engine flameout and told the first officer to communicate to the ground controller, therefore did not recognize the stall situation. The stall was further exacerbated when the captain increased the nose-up attitude to an AOA of 10.6°, which compounded the drop in airflow to the engines. In less than three minutes, the aircraft plunged from over 33,000 ft (10,000 m), reaching a maximum rate of descent of over 18,000 fpm, or 300 ft/s (90 m/s), crashing belly-first and exploding at 2:00:31 local time (07:00:31 UTC). The crash site was in a field on a cattle ranch near Machiques, in the western Zulia State, Venezuela (about 30 kilometres or 19 miles or 16 nautical miles from the Colombian border).

== Timeline ==
All times are UTC. (For local time in Panama and Colombia, subtract 5 hours; for Venezuela subtract 4:30 hours; for Martinique, subtract 4.)

- 00:58 Flight 708 departs from Panama en route to Martinique.
- 01:51 Crew reports trouble in one engine.
- 01:58 Crew requests and receives permission to descend from 31,000 to 14,000 ft (9,400 to 4,300 m).
- 01:59 Crew sends distress call: both engines flamed out, aircraft uncontrollable.
- 02:00 Contact with the aircraft is lost
- 02:01 Plane Crashes In the Venezuelan Perijá Mountains

== Investigation ==
The Air Accident Investigation Committee (CIAA, Spanish: Comité de Investigación de Accidentes Aéreos) of Venezuela led the investigation into the causes of the accident. The French Bureau of Enquiry and Analysis for Civil Aviation Safety (BEA, French: Bureau d'Enquêtes et d'Analyses pour la Sécurité de l'Aviation Civile) was assigned the main responsibility for investigative analysis of the flight data recorder and the cockpit voice recorder (CVR), with the United States National Transportation Safety Board (NTSB) also taking part in recovery of FDR data. On 22 November 2005, the CIAA released an initial report (significantly changed by the time of the final report) suggesting that a buildup of ice inside each engine's PT2 probe was partly responsible for the accident. Analysis of the CVR showed that the crew discussed weather conditions, including icing and severe thunderstorms and other forms of adverse weather conditions, continually requested and performed descents, which is the usual response to a low power or low airspeed situation.

Analysis of the debris showed that both engines were rotating at normal speed at the time of impact, which enabled investigators to conclude that the engines had not been previously damaged, and were functioning at the time of impact. Ground scars showed that the aircraft impacted in a nose-high attitude.

The CIAA, which by then had been renamed the Civil Aviation Accident Investigation Board (JIAAC, Spanish: Junta Investigadora de Accidentes de Aviación Civil), released their final report into the accident and found the probable underlying causes of the crash to be the result of pilot error. Underscoring the finding listing pilot error as a cause, the JIAAC noted a lack of both situational awareness and crew resource management (CRM), which would have better enabled the crew to properly respond to the stall and the severity of the emergency. The report stressed that the crew failed to operate the aircraft within its normal parameters. This resulted in the crew failing to recover from the stall due to poor decision-making and poor communication between the pilots. In addition, West Caribbean Airways came under criticism: West Caribbean failed to provide its pilots with the operation bulletin from Boeing, specifically addressing the autopilot issue; failed to emphasize CRM in ongoing pilot training; created stress for its pilots by not providing regular paychecks for a period of nearly six months leading up to the accident; and further created stress for the accident crew when the airplane was delayed and almost refused takeoff at their previous stop due to West Caribbean's non-payment of catering and food service fees.

== Aftermath ==
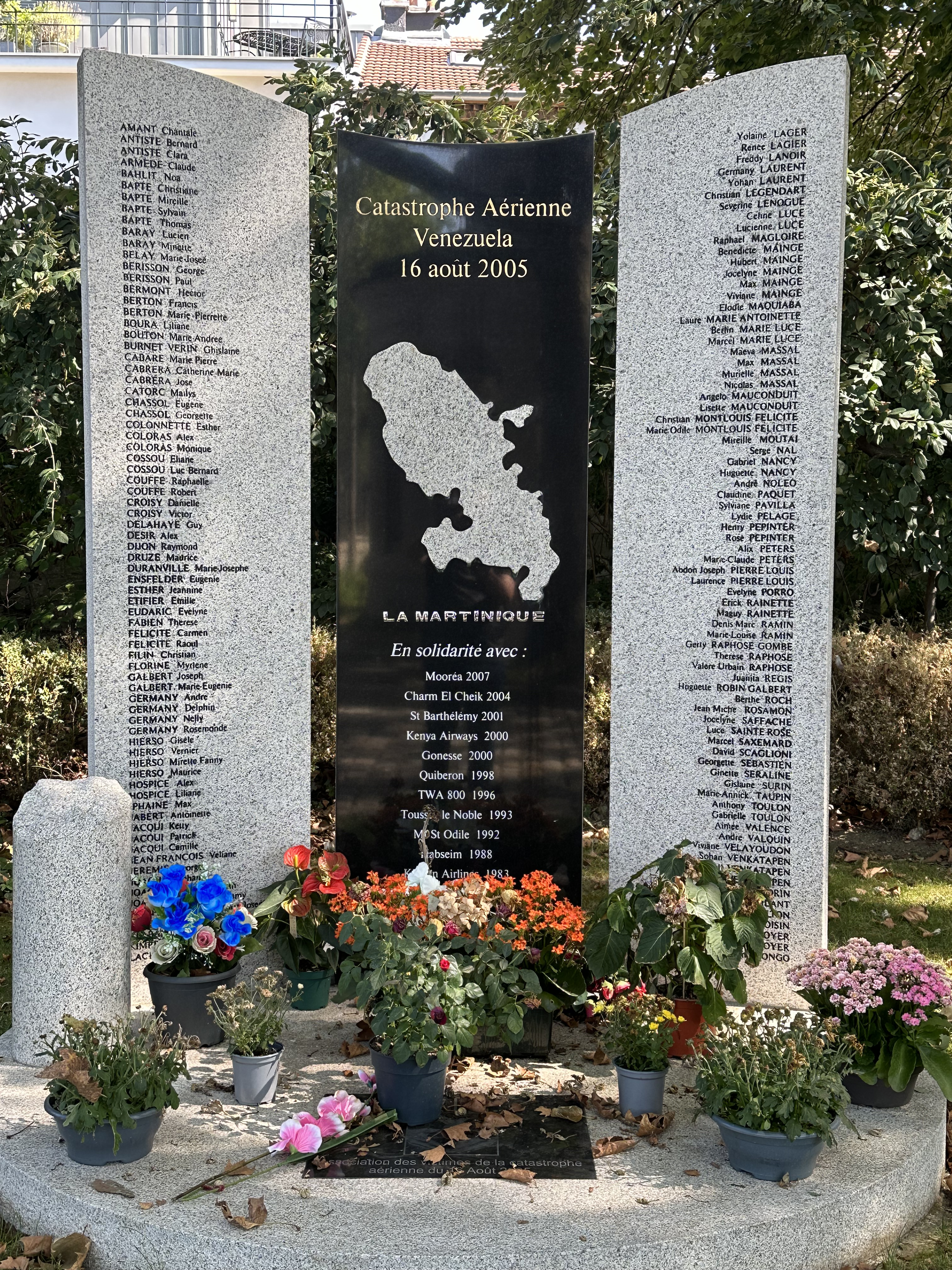
The memorial of West Caribbean Airways Flight 708

As a result of the crash, West Caribbean Airways was grounded by the CAEAC just one day after the crash occurred. The airline, already in serious financial difficulty, went bankrupt in October 2005, two months after the crash.

Some other airlines, including AeroTACA, also ceased operations that year following the crash.

== Media and popular culture ==
=== Dramatization ===
The hour-long Discovery Channel Canada TV series Mayday (other titles in other countries) featured the crash and investigation in a season 11 episode 2 titled "The Plane That Flew Too High".

In 2010, the documentary Panamá-Fort-de-France : autopsie d'un crash, [Panamá-Fort-de-France: autopsy of a crash] (in French) by Stéphane Gabet and Luc David, traces the event, as well as the investigation.

In 2015, Martinique La Première featured the 90-minute documentary: West-Caribbean : Mensonges et Vérité, [West-Caribbean: Lies and Truth] (in French) by AVCA member Christian Foret

A short film, Crossing Away, produced for the 10th anniversary of the Martinique-Panama plane crash, was not released until 2017.

=== In music ===
- "On n'oublie pas" [Don't Forget], (tribute to the 152 Martinican victims), 2014, written by Serge Bilé, sung by several artists and personalities including Jocelyne Beroard, Alpha Blondy, Harry Roselmack and Admiral T, to remember this event and to help the AVCA, the association of the victims of the air disaster, to raise funds.

== See also ==
- Air France Flight 447 - an Airbus A330 which also crashed following a high-altitude stall due to pilot error.
- Indonesia AirAsia Flight 8501 - an Airbus A320 which also crashed following a high-altitude stall due to pilot error.
- Pinnacle Airlines Flight 3701 - a CRJ200 which also crashed after pilots flew too high for the aircraft's configuration.
- Airborne Express Flight 827 - a DC-8 crash where the crew decreased the aircraft's speed until it entered a stall.
- West Caribbean Airways Flight 9955 - another fatal accident involving the airline 5 months earlier.
