= Dubnica Air =

Slovakian airline

- Founded: 2003
- Ceased operations: 2016
- Headquarters: Dubnica, Slovakia
- Website: http://www.dubnicaair.sk/

Dubnica Air was an airline based in Dubnica, Slovakia.

== Fleet ==
The airline flew:

- Let-410 turbo-lets
- Cessna P210
- Z-37 Cmelak
- Robinson R44

== Accidents and incidents ==
Two Dubnica Air Let-410s collided on August 20, 2015, killing 7 passengers.
