= Butembo Airport =

Airport in the Democratic Republic of the Congo

- IATA: RUE; ICAO: FZMB

Summary
- Airport type: Public
- Location: Butembo, Democratic Republic of the Congo
- Elevation AMSL: 1,500 m (4,900 ft)
- Coordinates: 0.11639°N 29.31333°E

Map
- Location within Democratic Republic of the Congo

Runways
| Direction | Length | | Surface |
| Direction | ft | m | Surface |
|---|---|---|---|
| 1 | | 700 | Gravel |

Butembo Airport, also known as Rughenda Airport, is a civil airport in the city of Butembo in the North Kivu province of the Democratic Republic of the Congo. It runs directly through the city, and as a consequence guards often need to be deployed in order to prevent pedestrians from crossing it. It's longest runway is 794 meters (2,605 feet) long.

== Accidents and incidents ==
- On 17 March 2024 a Let L-410 Turbolet was involved an accident while landing at Butembo Airport. Two people were allegedly injured.
