= El Embrujo Airport =

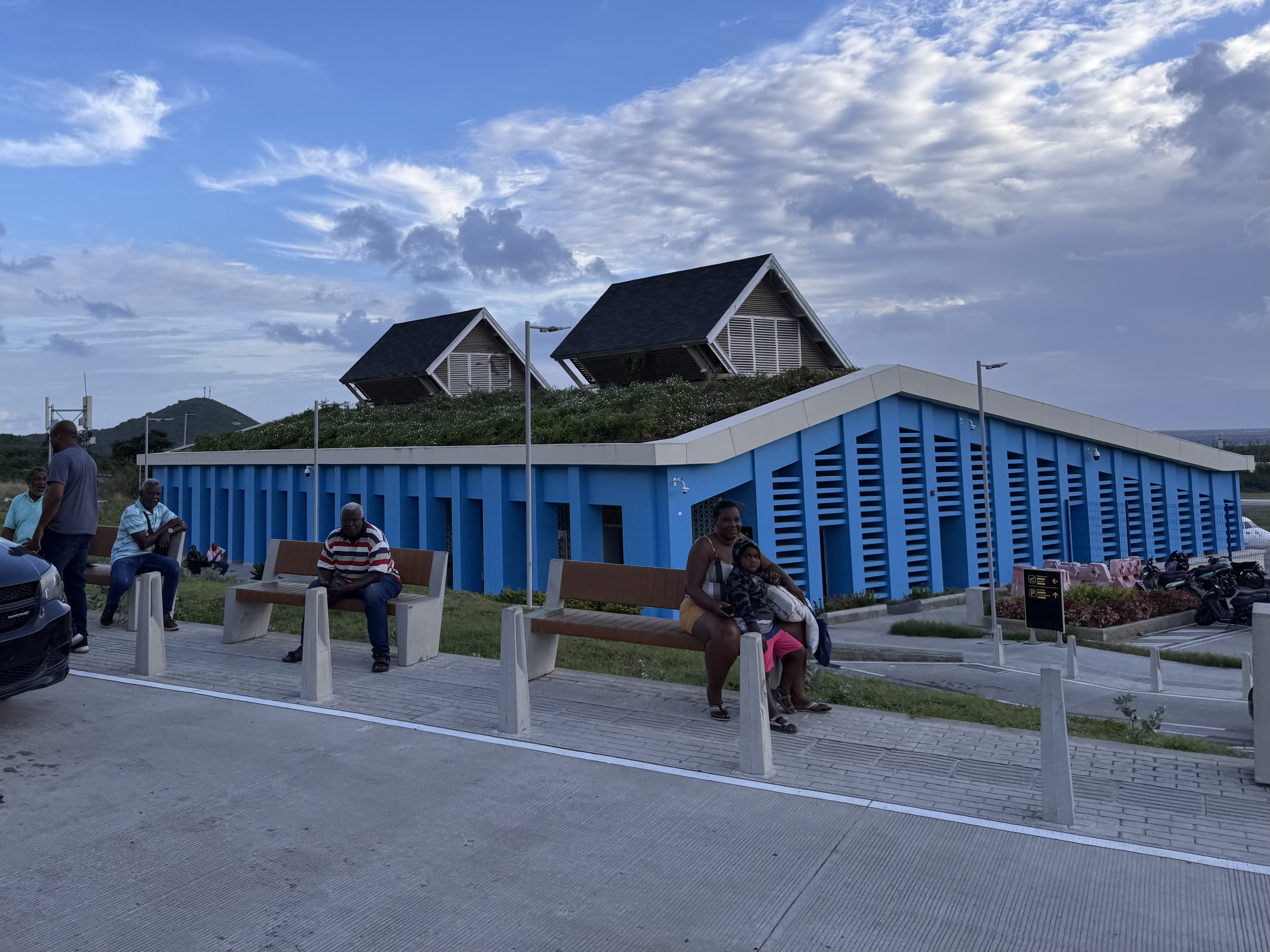
- IATA: PVA; ICAO: SKPV

Summary
- Airport type: Public
- Serves: Providencia Island, Colombia
- Location: Providencia Island, Colombia
- Elevation AMSL: 29 ft / 9 m
- Coordinates: 13°21′25″N 81°21′30″W

Map
- Location of airport in Colombia

Runways
Direction	Length		Surface
Direction	m	ft	Surface
17/35	1,290	4,232	Asphalt

Statistics (2017)
- Passengers: 71,101
- Airfreight: 385
- Sources: GCM Google Maps Aeronáutica Civil

El Embrujo Airport (IATA: PVA, ICAO: SKPV) is an airport serving Providencia Island, Colombia. The airport is located in the north east side of the island, in the limits of the Old Providence McBean Lagoon National Natural Park.

The runway is on the eastern edge of the island, with high terrain to the west. Runway 17 has a 150 metres (490 ft) displaced threshold.

== History ==
The airport was built in the 1970s, with small aircraft serving sporadic trips between San Andrés and Providencia Island.

Prior to 1984, the airport had limited traffic from San Andrés Airport due to its short runway.

Under Governor Gonzales, architect Ricardo Gonzalez Farah lengthened the runway by 300 metres (980 ft) and rebuilt the passenger terminal in typical Caribbean architecture. After the upgrades, SAM Colombia began flights from San Andrés. Later, the airport was again refurbished, with improved air terminal facilities.

== Airlines and destinations ==
Airlines	Destinations
SATENA	San Andrés Island

== Transportation ==
=== Taxi ===
Taxis are available at the airport meeting incoming planes. All taxis charge the same rate to any destination.

== See also ==
- Transport in Colombia
- List of airports in Colombia
