= List of companies of Panama =

Location of Panama

Panama is a country usually considered to be entirely in North America or Central America. Panama's economy, because of its key geographic location, is mainly based on a well developed service sector especially commerce, tourism, and trading. The handover of the Canal and military installations by the United States has given rise to large construction projects.

== Notable firms ==
This list includes notable companies with primary headquarters located in the country. The industry and sector follow the Industry Classification Benchmark taxonomy. Organizations which have ceased operations are included and noted as defunct.

Notable companies Status: P=Private, S=State; A=Active, D=Defunct
Name	Industry	Sector	Headquarters	Founded	Notes	Status	
Aeroperlas	Consumer services	Airlines	Panama City	1970	Airline, defunct 2012	P	D
Air Panamá Internacional	Consumer services	Airlines	Panama City	1968	Airline, defunct 1990	P	D
Air Panama	Consumer services	Airlines	Panama City	1980	Regional airline	P	A
Air Services Cargo	Industrials	Delivery services	Panama City	2002	Cargo airline, defunct 2003	P	D
Alas Chiricanas	Consumer services	Airlines	Panama City	1980	Commuter airline, defunct 1995	P	D
Balboa Bank and Trust	Financials	Banking	Panama City	2003	Banks	P	A
Banco Latinoamericano de Comercio Exterior	Financials	Banking	Panama City	1979	Banks	P	A
Copa Airlines	Consumer services	Airlines	Panama City	1944	Airline, part of Copa Holdings	P	A
Copa Holdings	Consumer services	Airlines	Panama City	1944	Holding company for Copa Airlines	P	A
DHL Aero Expreso	Industrials	Delivery services	Panama City	1996	Cargo airline, part of DHL Express (Germany)	P	A
Grupo Banistmo	Financials	Banks	Panama City	1984	Merged in 2007 with HSBC Bank (Panama)	P	D
Hotfile	Technology	Internet	Panama City	2006	File hosting, defunct 2013	P	D
HSBC Bank (Panama)	Financials	Banks	Panama City	1972	Part of HSBC (UK)	P	A
Mossack Fonseca	Industrials	Business support services	Panama City	1977	Law firm	P	A
National Bank of Panama	Financials	Banks	Panama City	1904	State bank	S	A
NordVPN	Technology	Internet/Online	Panama City	2012	VPN	P	A
Panavia	Industrials	Delivery services	Panama City	1994	Cargo airline, defunct 2006	P	D
Primer Banco del Istmo	Financials	Banks	Panama City	1984	Defunct 2009	P	D

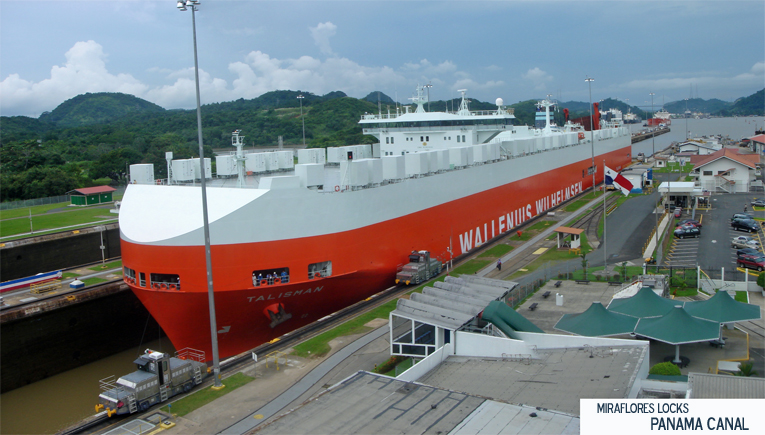
A Panamax ship in transit through the Miraflores locks, Panama Canal.

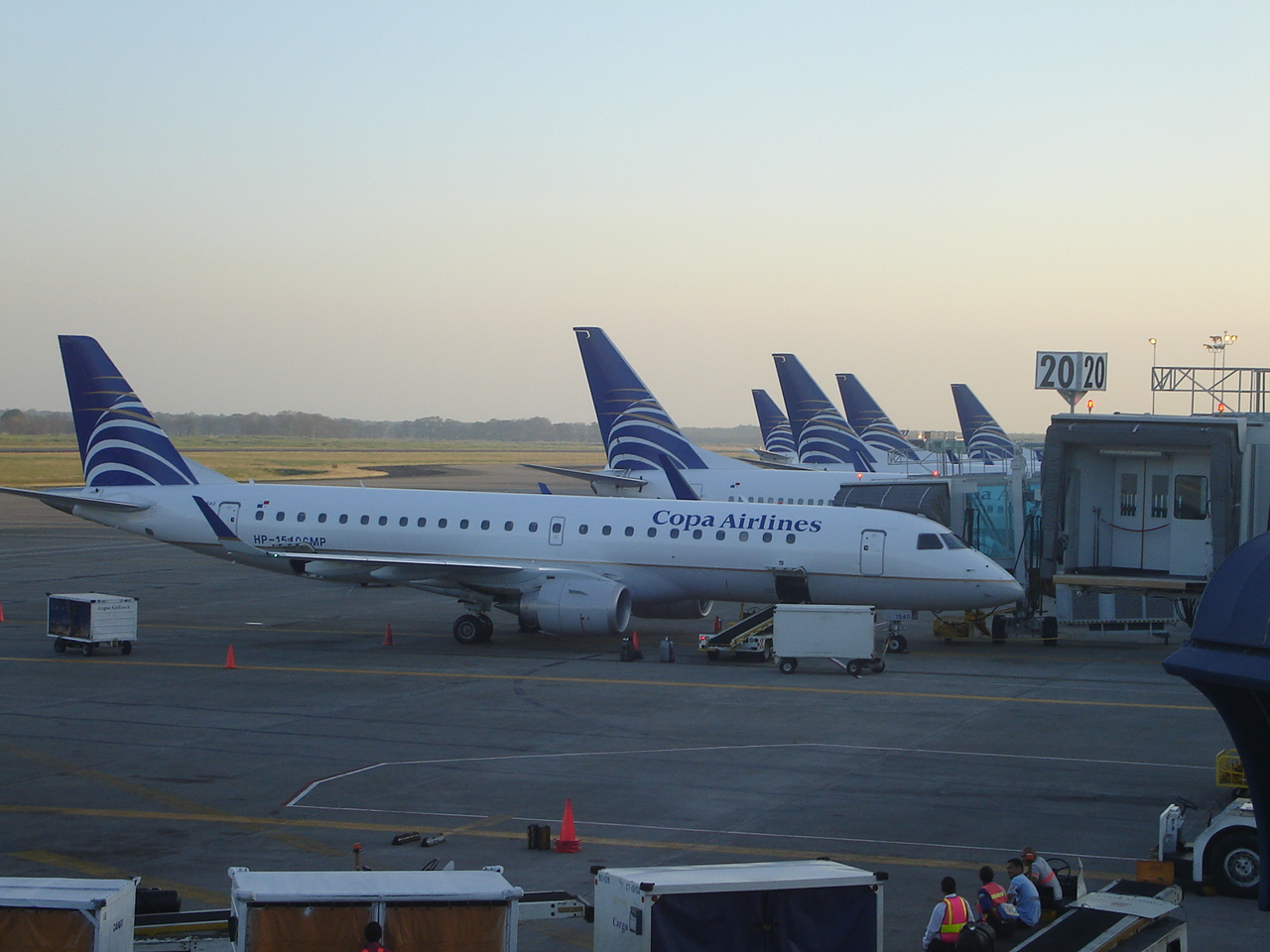
Tocumen International Airport, Central America's largest airport

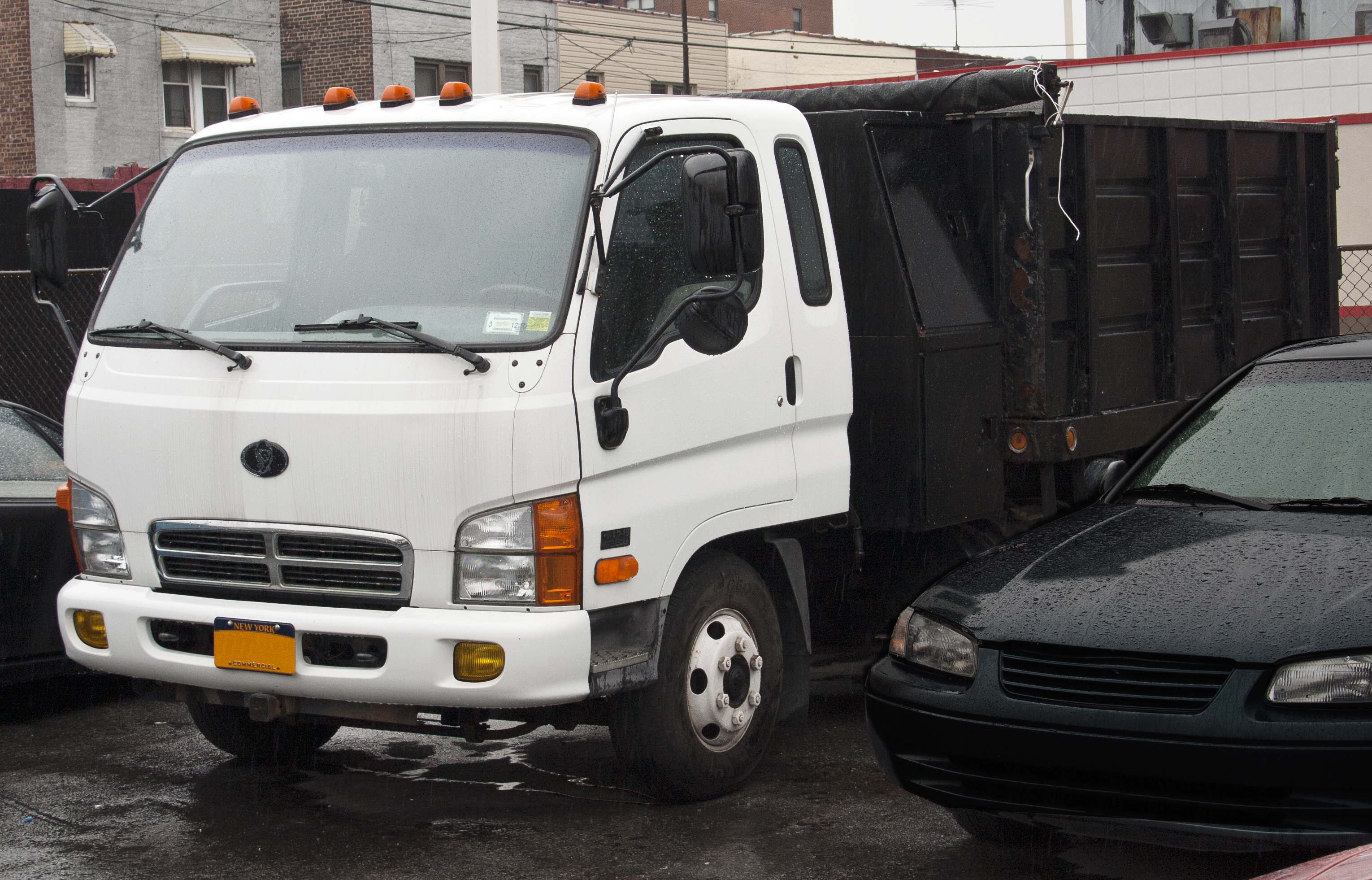
Bering Motors LD15 in the United States.

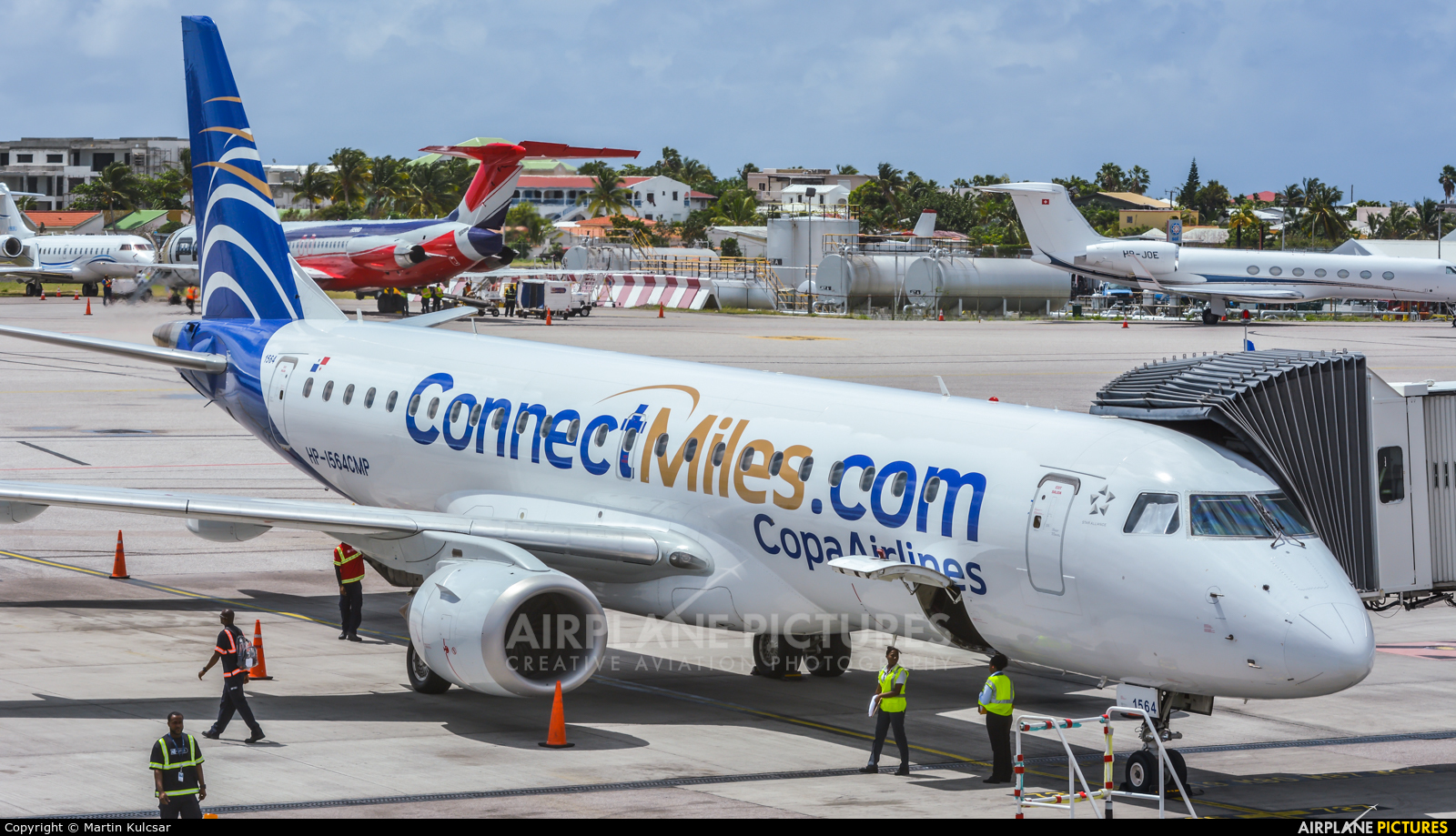
Copa Airlines Embraer 190 at Princess Juliana Airport (SXM)

== See also ==
- List of airlines of Panama
