= List of airlines of Panama =

This is a list of active airlines in Panama holding an air operator's certificate issued by the Civil Aviation Authority as of September 13, 2024.

== Active ==
=== Regular and non-regular ===
Airline	Image	IATA	ICAO	Callsign	Hub(s)	Founded	Notes
Air Panama		7P	PST	AIR PANAMA	Albrook "Marcos A. Gelabert" International Airport	1980	
Copa Airlines		CM	CMP	COPA	Tocumen International Airport	1944	Flag carrier
Flytrip		FE	AAD	PANABEAR	Albrook "Marcos A. Gelabert" International Airport	1999	Domestic airline
Wingo Panama		WH	WWP	WINGO PANAMA	Panamá Pacífico International Airport	2021	Low-cost airline owned by Copa Airlines

=== Cargo only ===
Airline	Image	IATA	ICAO	Callsign	Hub(s)	Founded	Notes
Cargo Three		C3	CTW	THIRD CARGO	Tocumen International Airport	1991	
DHL Aero Expreso		D5	DAE	YELLOW	Tocumen International Airport	1996	
Uniworld Air Cargo		U7	UCG	UNIWORLD	Tocumen International Airport	2014	

== Defunct ==
Airline	Image	IATA	ICAO	Callsign	Founded	Ceased operations	Notes
Aero Palmas International Airlines					1985	1991	Renamed to Trans Canal Airways
Aerofletes Internacionales				AFISA	1966	1969	
Aeroperlas		WL	APP	AEROPERLAS	1970	2012	
Aerovías Nacionales					1932	1941	
Air Panamá Internacional		OP	API	ARPA	1967	1990	
Air Services Cargo					2002	2003	
Air Transport Gelabert					1933	1941	
Alas Chiricanas			AHC	ALAS CHIRICANAS	1980	1995	Absorbed by Aeroperlas
Aerovias Panama Airways					1956	1965	Renamed to AVISPA
Arrow Panama		8A	WAP	ARROW PANAMA	2005	2008	
ATP Cargo			AEP		1986	1987	
Bocas Air					2021	2022	
Chitreana de Aviación					1977	1996	
Inair Panama		IX			1967	1984	
Isthmian Airways					1929	1936	
Las Americas Cargo			AVL	LAS AMERICAS	1993	1994	
Pacific International Airlines		P4	PFC		1993	1997	
PAISA		PI	PAI	PAISA	1967	1969	Subsidiary of Viasa
Panama International Airways					1990	1991	
Panama World Airways			PWA		1980	1981	
Panavia		6Z	PNV	PANAVIA	1994	2006	
RAPSA					1958	1977	
TLN Airlines					1993	1999	
Trans Latin Air			TLA		1990	1993	Renamed to TLN Airlines
Trans Panama		2T			1978	1980	

== See also ==
- List of airlines of the Americas
