= Panamá Pacífico International Airport =

Commercial airport serving Panama City, Panama

Panamá Pacífico International Airport Aeropuerto Internacional Panamá Pacífico
- Panamá Pacífico International Airport in 2022
- IATA: BLB; ICAO: MPPA

Summary
- Airport type: Public
- Serves: Panama City
- Location: Panama Pacifico, Veracruz, Arraiján, Panama
- Hub for: Wingo Panama
- Elevation AMSL: 52 ft (16 m)
- Coordinates: 8°54′54″N 79°35′58″W

Map
- Location in Panama

Runways
Direction	Length		Surface
Direction	m	ft	Surface
18/36	2,590	8,497	Asphalt

Statistics (2018)
- Total Passengers: 259,491
- Source: WAD GCM Google Maps

Panamá Pacífico International Airport (IATA: BLB, ICAO: MPPA) is a commercial airport in Panama. It is located on the site of the former Howard Air Force Base, a United States Air Force base that was within the Panama Canal Zone. Panama City can be reached by crossing the nearby Bridge of the Americas.

Commercial airline service started in 2014, with VivaColombia being the first to begin operations to Bogotá and Medellin. Since then, the airport receives regular regular commercial flights with Boeing 737 aircraft from South and Central America and the Caribbean.

== Facilities ==
The airport is 6 miles (9.7 km) southwest of Balboa, the port at the Pacific (southeastern) end of the Panama Canal. Most of the area around it is uninhabited and forms part of the Canal Zone watershed.

The runway has full instrument approach facilities. The runway length does not include 300 metres (980 ft) displaced thresholds on each end. There is high terrain just northwest of the runway.

The Taboga Island VOR-DME (Ident: TBG) is located 8.0 nautical miles (14.8 km) south-southeast of the airport. The Taboga Island non-directional beacon (Ident: TBG) is located 7.9 nautical miles (14.6 km) south-southeast of the airport. The Tocumen VOR-DME (Ident: TUM) is located 14.4 nautical miles (27 km) northeast of the airport.

== History ==
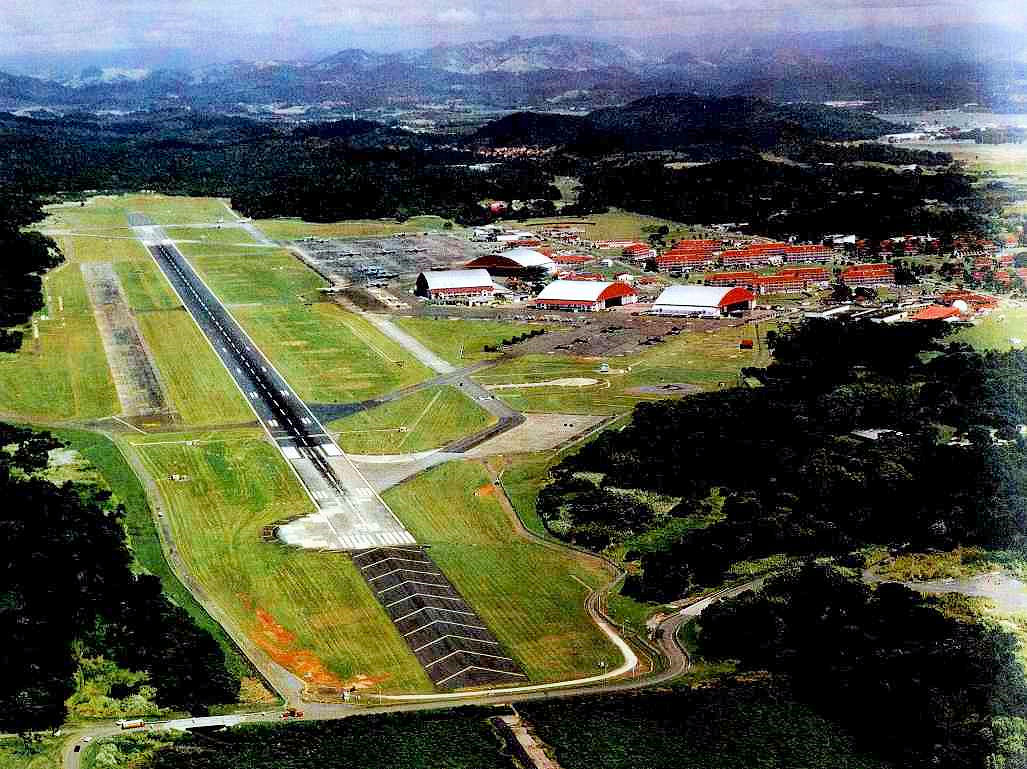
Howard Air Force Base in 1970

=== Background ===
Its construction was begun in 1939 by the U.S. military forces occupying the Panama Canal Zone, removing 500 yards (460 m) of thick jungle from the Pacific zone and inaugurated as Howard Air Force Base in 1942, in honor of Major Charles H. Howard (1892–1936). As a result of the Torrijos-Carter Treaties, on November 1, 1999, the air base was transferred to Panamanian control and converted into a civilian airport.

==== Panama Pacifico Special Economic Zone ====
Like many of the military structures that passed into Panamanian hands and were given civilian use, part of the former air base attached to the airport became a mixed-use real estate development under the Panama Pacifico Special Economic Area, with the creation of the Panama Pacifico Special Economic Area Agency (APP), housing multinational companies such as 3M, Dell Technologies, VF Corporation, BASF, Caterpillar, among many others.

In February 2008, the production for the James Bond movie Quantum of Solace used the base to double for an airport in Bolivia.

The Panamanian National Air Show takes place at the airport every year, usually on the last Sunday of January.

=== Start of use as a commercial airport ===
Since 2014, with the emergence of ultra-low-cost carrier (ULCC) in Latin America, Panama Pacífico has become attractive for airlines flying to and from Panama City with lower operating fees compared to Panama's main airport, Tocumen International Airport, popularly known as the Hub of the Americas (Hub de las Américas) and home base for Copa Airlines.

On August 1, 2014, ultra-low-cost airline VivaColombia became the first company to fly regularly to Panamá Pacífico, launching flights from Bogotá and Medellín.

On February 23, 2017, ultra-low-cost airline Wingo, owned by Copa Holdings, which is controlled by Copa Airlines, began flights between Cartagena de Indias and Panamá Pacífico, followed in July by the addition of Bogotá, Cali and Medellín to its route network.

Starting in 2019, the Ecuadorian airline Aeroregional began operating a series of weekly charter flights between Quito and Panamá Pacífico, a route that has proven to be consolidated and has become a regular international destination. However, due to the pandemic, all flights were suspended and the airport remained closed for two years and four months.

Passenger terminal in 2025

==== Expansion and renovation of the passenger terminal ====
Between March 2020, immediately after the outbreak of the COVID-19 pandemic, and July 28, 2022, the airport remained closed and underwent a process of remodeling and expansion of its passenger terminal, which included the creation of a new boarding hall, arrival areas and baggage carousels, adaptation of new spaces for commercial areas, reformulation of the check-in and immigration counter areas, renovation of the bathrooms, construction of storm drains, waterproofing of the roof, renovation of the air conditioning systems, among other changes, in an investment of almost US$1 million.

On July 28, 2022, the airport was reopened with the inauguration of the new passenger terminal and the resumption of commercial flights by Aeroregional, originating from Quito. Subsequently, the airline also began offering seasonal charter flights from Loja and Machala.

In 2021, Panamá Pacífico became the base of operations for Wingo Panama, a subsidiary of Colombian ultra-low-cost carrier Wingo. The company's commercial operations from Panamá Pacífico began on July 12, 2023, with domestic flights to David, followed by the addition of international flights to destinations in South and Central America and the Caribbean.

== Airlines and destinations ==
=== Passenger ===
The following airlines operate regular scheduled flights at the airport.

Airlines	Destinations
Wingo	Barranquilla, Bogota, Cartagena, Cali, Havana, Medellín–JMC

== See also ==
- Transport in Panama
- List of airports in Panama
