= Cargo Three =

Panamanian cargo airline

IATA	ICAO	Call sign
C3	CTW	THIRD CARGO
- Founded: 1991; 35 years ago (as Cargo Three Panama)
- Hubs: Tocumen International Airport
- Secondary hubs: Miami International Airport
- Fleet size: 1
- Parent company: JMB Aviation Group
- Headquarters: Panama City, Panamá
- Key people: Eric Andrews (President)
- Website: www.cargothree.com

Cargo Three Inc., stylized as CARGOTHREƎ, is a Panamanian cargo airline headquartered in Panama City, Panama.

== History ==
=== Early operations ===
Cargo Three was registered in 1991 in Public Deed No. 520 of the 9th Notary of the Circuit of Panama with Germinal Sarasqueta as its president. During its first phase until the early 2000s, the airline operated flights to destinations such as Miami and Bogotá with a fleet consisting of a Boeing 707 and Convair CV-240 aircraft. The airline suspended its operations for unknown reasons in mid-2000.

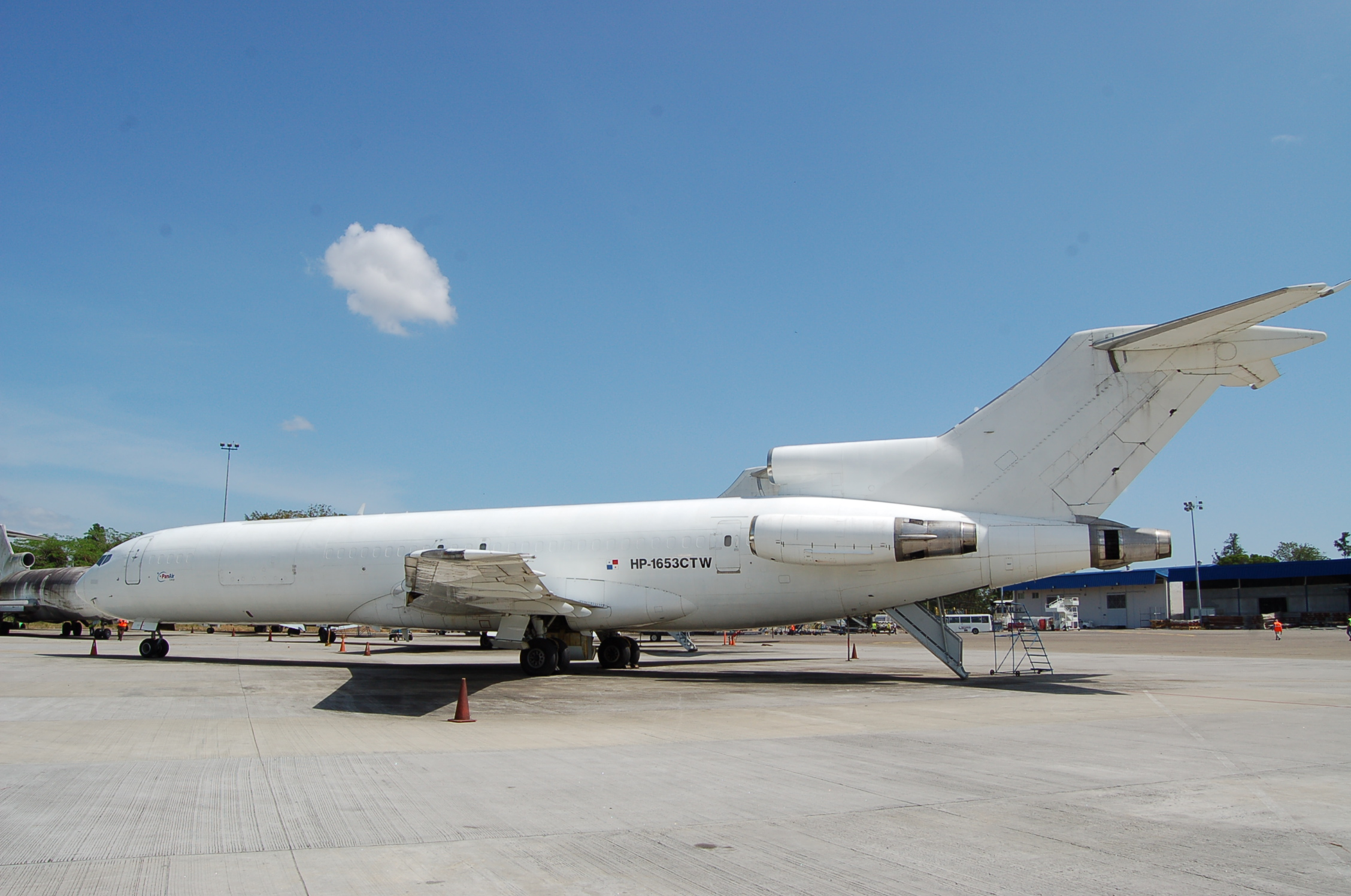
A former PanAir Cargo Boeing 727-200F in storage at Tocumen International Airport in 2011

In 2003, Cargo Three underwent a rebranding process, returning to the skies operating under the brand PanAir Cargo, also operating six Convair CV-240s, in the CV-580F variant, in addition to a Convair C-131 Samaritan and a Boeing 727-200F. In late 2010, for the second time, PanAir Cargo suspended its operations for unknown reasons.

After a two-year hiatus under the management of new owners in a mixed partnership between Panamanian citizen Blanca Vasquez (51%) and Venezuelan Daniel Rangel (49%), PanAir Cargo resumed its operations with the incorporation of a Boeing 727-200F, registration HP-1754CTW, flying from its base at Tocumen International Airport to destinations in South and Central America. The aircraft was leased from the Canadian Matata Group, which subsequently filed a lawsuit against the airline in a Canadian court for non-payment of the aircraft's lease. In 2015, the airline suspended its operations for the third time.

=== Restructuring ===
In 2019, JMB Aviation Group, owner of Venezuelan airline Transcarga International Airways, acquired a 49% stake in PanAir Cargo, announcing the resumption of operations with an Airbus A300B4-200F and the intention to rename it Transcarga Panama. However, due to the outbreak of the COVID-19 pandemic in 2020, these plans were postponed.

In 2021, in the wake of the economic sanctions imposed on Venezuela in May 2019, as an alternative to meet the demand for air cargo that was transported by Transcarga, which was banned from flying to the United States, JMB Aviation Group resumed plans to launch the Panamanian airline under the original Cargo Three brand.

Initially, the airline's intention was to begin operations with the Airbus A300, which received the Panamanian registration HP-1755CTW and the colors of its new operator at MRO Mexicana, at Mexico City International Airport. The airline received its air operator's certificate (AOC) issued by the Civil Aviation Authority of Panama in early April 2021 and established Tocumen International Airport as its base of operations.

For unknown reasons, the A300 was never delivered. The project remained dormant until 2023, when it announced its intention to enter the market, with the acquisition of three retired McDonnell Douglas MD-10F from FedEx, with the expectation of starting flights in South America such as Buenos Aires, Lima, Santiago, Campinas and Manaus, to Miami, through the development of its hub in Panama City in the second half of 2023.

However, the plan was postponed to the second half of 2024 for operational reasons. Cargo Three also has plans to establish a new hub that will connect Panama City with Caracas, Barcelona, Maracaibo, Porlamar and Valencia in Venezuela, with flights expected to be operated by Transcarga.

On February 2, 2024, the first MD-10-30F, previously operated by FedEx (N311FE), was transferred for maintenance at Ernesto Cortissoz International Airport, in Barranquilla. It was given the same registration as the former A300. On August 5, the aircraft was officially handed over to its new operator and transferred to its new home in Panama City.

== Fleet ==
=== Current fleet ===
As of August 2025, Cargo Three operates the following aircraft:

Cargo Three fleet
Aircraft	In service	Orders	Notes
McDonnell Douglas MD-10-30F	1	2	
Total	1	2	

=== Former fleet ===
Cargo Three former fleet
Aircraft	Total	Years of operation	Notes
Boeing 707-300C	1	1993–1994	
Boeing 727-200F	2	2009–2015	One stored in Panama City; One broken up in Maracaibo
Convair C-131 Samaritan	1	2006-2010	Broken up in Panama City
Convair CV-440	1	1991–1993	Crashed in Bogotá
Convair CV-580	5	1991–2010	Broken up in Panama City

== See also ==
- List of airlines of Panama
