= Alas Chiricanas Flight 00901 =

1994 aircraft bombing in Panama

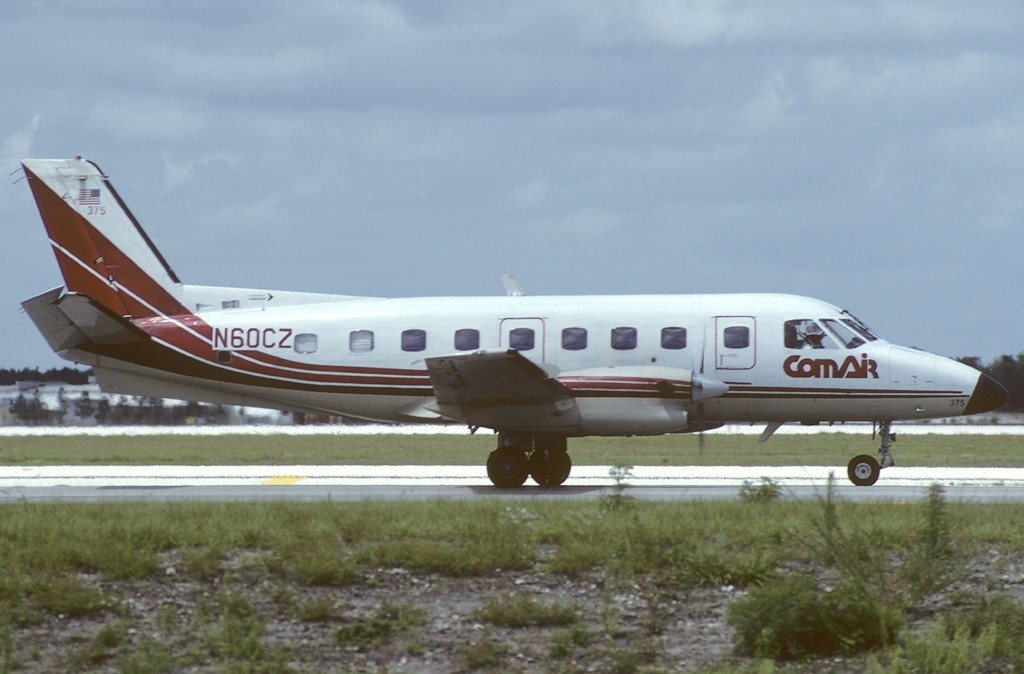
- N60CZ, the aircraft involved in the accident in April 1991 at Orlando International Airport while still in service with Comair.

Bombing
- Date: July 19, 1994
- Summary: In-flight explosion by bombing, unsolved crash
- Site: near Enrique Adolfo Jiménez Airport Colón, Panama

Aircraft
- Aircraft type: Embraer EMB 110 Bandeirante
- Operator: Alas Chiricanas
- Registration: HP-1202AC
- Flight origin: Enrique Adolfo Jiménez Airport; Colón, Panama
- Destination: Tocumen International Airport; Panama City, Panama
- Passengers: 18
- Crew: 3
- Fatalities: 21
- Survivors: 0

Alas Chiricanas Flight 00901, registered HP-1202AC, was an Embraer EMB 110 Bandeirante aircraft flying en route from Colón city to Panama City which exploded shortly after departing Enrique Adolfo Jiménez Airport, on the night of July 19, 1994. All 21 on board were killed in the bombing. Twelve of the victims were Jewish. Both Panamanian and American authorities declared the bombing an act of terrorism.

== Investigation ==
The wreckage of the Bandeirante was strewn about the Santa Rita Mountains near Colón. Panamanian investigators quickly determined that the explosion had been caused by a bomb, probably detonated by a suicide bomber aboard the aircraft. Only one body was not claimed by relatives; this body is believed to be that of a man named Jamal Lya. Officials suspected that the incident was an act of terrorism by Hezbollah directed against Jews in part because it took place one day after the AMIA bombing in Buenos Aires, and due to an expression of support by "Ansar Allah", a Hezbollah affiliate in South America.

=== Later developments ===
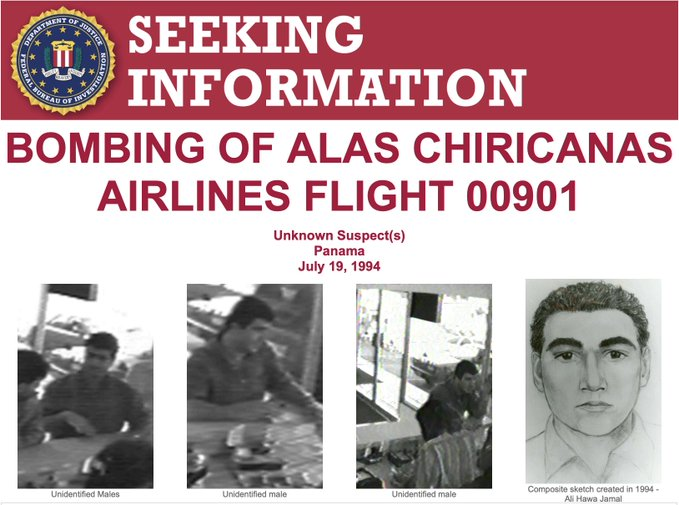
A Federal Bureau of Investigation seeking information poster about Jamal

In 2018, the President of Panama Juan Carlos Varela said "recent evidence" and intelligence reports "clearly show it was a terrorist attack," and that he would ask local and international authorities to reopen the investigation. The FBI have in its investigations identified the perpetrator to have been a passenger named Ali Hawa Jamal.

== See also ==
- List of unsolved murders (1900–1979)
- Air India Flight 182, terrorist bombing perpetrated by Babbar Khalsa.
- Avianca Flight 203, in-flight bombing ordered by the Medellín Cartel.
- Cubana de Aviación Flight 455, terrorist bombing over Barbados.
- Pan Am Flight 103, in-flight suicide bombing as part of a terrorist attack by Libyan agents.
- UTA Flight 772, terrorist bombing over Niger. Responsibility claimed by the Islamic Jihad Organization.
