= Wingo Panama =

Panamanian low-cost airline

La Nueva Aerolínea S.A.
IATA	ICAO	Call sign
WH	WWP	WINGO PANAMA
- Founded: August 13, 2021; 5 years ago
- Commenced operations: August 11, 2023; 3 years ago
- Hubs: Panamá Pacífico International Airport; Tocumen International Airport
- Frequent-flyer program: ConnectMiles
- Fleet size: 1
- Destinations: 16 (as of September 2024)
- Parent company: Wingo
- Traded as: Wingo Panamá
- Headquarters: Panama City, Panama
- Key people: Eduardo Lombana (CEO)
- Website: www.wingo.com

La Nueva Aerolínea S.A., operating as Wingo (Panamá), is a Panamanian subsidiary of the Colombian low-cost airline Wingo, headquartered in Panama City. Its base of operations is located at Panama Pacifico International Airport, in Balboa, a district of Panama City.

== History ==
=== Establishment ===
Aiming to expand business opportunities and growth of its route network through bilateral agreements between countries in South and Central America, and mainly to face the expansion of its competitors, in 2021, Wingo, a Colombian low-cost airline owned by Copa Holdings, began the certification process to obtain a Panamanian air operator certificate.

On August 12, 2021, Wingo Panama received its Air Operator Certificate (AOC) from the Civil Aviation Authority of Panama (AAC), being authorized to begin operations from the country, exploring opportunities in the domestic market and especially on international routes. After certification, however, the airline remained dormant.

=== Start of operations ===
On July 12, 2023, almost two years after obtaining its AOC, Wingo announced the start of operations of its Panamanian subsidiary, with the launch of domestic flights between Panama City–Balboa and David, starting August 11. The flights will be operated using Wingo's fleet of Boeing 737-800 aircraft, which have Panamanian aeronautical registration and are operated on an interchange basis between the parent company and its subsidiary. Flights are also operated under the IATA code P5, from its parent company Wingo.

==== Copa Cargo ====
Since March 28, 2022, Wingo Panamá has been responsible for operations carried out under the Copa Cargo brand, a cargo subsidiary of Copa Holdings based at Tocumen International Airport, operating with a dedicated Boeing 737-800BCF to destinations such as Bogotá, Guatemala City, Havana, Managua, México City, Quito, San Jose, San Salvador, Santo Domingo and Kingston.

== Destinations ==
Wingo Panama's commercial passenger flights are operated under the Colombian parent company's IATA code P5, with Panamanian-registered aircraft operating on an interchange basis between the parent company and the subsidiary, while cargo flights are operated under the WH code. As of September 2024, Wingo Panama is operating to the following destinations:

Base
Future
Terminated

Wingo Panamá destinations
Country	City	Airport	Notes
Colombia
Colombia	Barranquilla	Ernesto Cortissoz International Airport	opby Wingo
Colombia	Bogotá	El Dorado International Airport	opf Copa Cargo
Colombia	Cali	Alfonso Bonilla Aragón International Airport	opby Wingo
Colombia	Cartagena	Rafael Núñez International Airport	opby Wingo
Colombia	Medellín	José María Córdova International Airport	opby Wingo
Costa Rica
Costa Rica	San José	Juan Santamaría International Airport	opby Wingo opf Copa Cargo
Cuba
Cuba	Havana	José Martí International Airport	opby Wingo opf Copa Cargo
Ecuador
Ecuador	Quito	Mariscal Sucre International Airport	opf Copa Cargo
El Salvador
El Salvador	San Salvador	El Salvador International Airport	opf Copa Cargo
Guatemala
Guatemala	Guatemala City	La Aurora International Airport	opf Copa Cargo
Jamaica
Jamaica	Kingston	Norman Manley International Airport	opf Copa Cargo
Mexico
Mexico	Mexico City	Felipe Ángeles International Airport	opf Copa Cargo
Nicaragua
Nicaragua	Managua	Augusto C. Sandino International Airport	opf Copa Cargo
Panama
Panama	David	Enrique Malek International Airport	opby Wingo
Panama	Panama City	Panamá Pacífico International Airport	opby Wingo
Panama	Panama City	Tocumen International Airport	opf Copa Cargo
República Dominicana
República Dominicana	Santo Domingo	Las Américas International Airport	opf Copa Cargo

== Fleet ==
As of August 2025, Wingo Panama operates the following aircraft:

Wingo Panamá fleet
Aircraft	In service	Orders	Passengers	Note
Boeing 737-800BCF	2	—	Cargo	opf Copa Cargo
TOTAL	2	—		

Regular destinations will be operated by its parent company Wingo's fleet on an interchange basis between Colombia and Panama.

== See also ==
- List of airlines of Panama
