= Pedro Heilbron =

Panamanian businessman

- Born: March 5, 1958 (age 68); Colón, Panama
- Education: College of the Holy Cross (BA); George Washington University (MBA)
- Title: CEO of Copa Holdings S.A.

Pedro Heilbron (born March 5, 1958) is a Panamanian business executive. He is the chief executive officer (CEO) of Copa Holdings S.A., the parent company of the Panamanian carrier Copa Airlines and the Colombian carrier Copa Airlines Colombia.

== Early life and education ==
Heilbron graduated from the College of the Holy Cross in Worcester, Massachusetts, with a Bachelor of Arts in economics in 1979 and earned a Master of Business Administration (MBA) from George Washington University.

== Career ==
Heilbron joined Copa Airlines as CEO in 1988. Under his leadership, Copa expanded and transformed from a regional player into one of the three large air groups in Latin America, increasing the fleet from two (1988) to 98 aircraft (2014) and annual revenues growing from $20 million to $3 billion in the same time period. The company joined the Star Alliance in 2012.

In December 2016, Heilbron was elected as chairman of the Star Alliance chief executive board, succeeding former chairman Calin Rovinescu.

== Additional affiliations ==
Pedro Heilbron is also a member of the board of governors of IATA, past president and current vice-president of the Latin American Airline Association (ALTA).

== Awards and recognition ==
In 2006, Heilbron received the Bravo Award as CEO of the Year by Latin Trade magazine and was named Executive of the Year by the Panamanian Association of Corporate Executives (APEDE) two years later. In 2009, he was awarded the Airline Business Lifetime Achievement Award by Airline Business.

In 2014, Heilbron was recognized with the Tony Jannus award by the Tony Jannus Disdinguished Aviation Society, (which was formed by the Tampa and St. Petersburg chambers of commerce).
