= Copa Airlines Colombia =

Airline based in Bogotá, Colombia

IATA	ICAO	Call sign
P5	RPB	AEROREPUBLICA
- Founded: November 23, 1992; 33 years ago (as Aero República)
- Commenced operations: October 6, 2010; 16 years ago (as Copa Airlines Colombia)
- Ceased operations: 2020 (as an airline)
- Hubs: Bogotá
- Focus cities: Panama City–Tocumen; San Andres Island; Medellín–JMC
- Frequent-flyer program: ConnectMiles
- Alliance: Star Alliance (affiliate)
- Fleet size: 9
- Destinations: 6
- Parent company: Copa Holdings
- Headquarters: Bogotá, Colombia
- Key people: Eduardo Lombana (CEO)
- Website: www.copaair.com/es-co

Copa Airlines Colombia is a commercial passenger airline founded and registered under the corporate name of AeroRepública S.A. in November 1992, and is the second airline in Colombia for international passengers carried after Avianca and the third in total traffic. It covers national and international destinations from the El Dorado International Airport in Bogotá and from the main cities of Colombia. As of October 5, 2010, the airline used the trade name of Copa Airlines Colombia.

Today, AeroRepublica S.A. flights using the Copa Airlines brand Copa Holdings in some destinations and also the Wingo brand in others.

== History ==
=== Founding ===
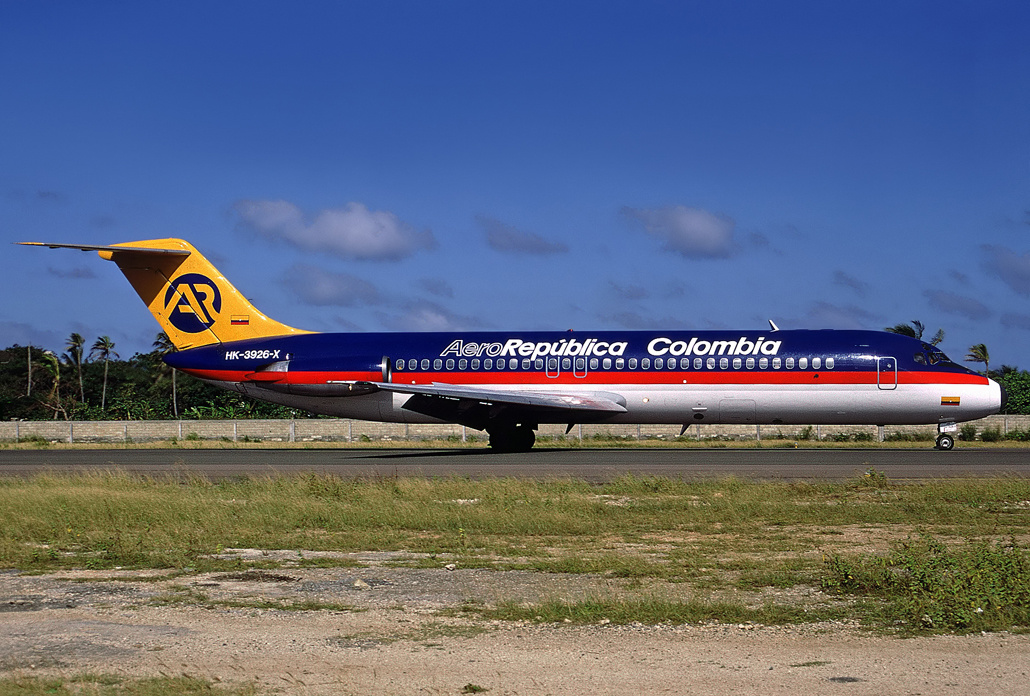
An AeroRepública Douglas DC-9-30 at Gustavo Rojas Pinilla International Airport in 1994

In 1992, during the economic liberalization policy of Colombian President César Gaviria, under the leadership of Alfonso Velandia and Amos Ginor, negotiations began to create AeroRepública, the first private airline to be created in Colombia in years. The airline started operations on 19 June 1993, with Boeing 727-100 aircraft painted with the yellow, blue and red colors of the flag of Colombia, initially flying to Colombian coastal cities, such as Santa Marta, Cartagena, and San Andrés from Bogotá.

In the first months of operations, AeroRepública added new domestic destinations such as Cali, Medellín, Barranquilla, Montería, and Leticia. It also launched international services to Aruba and Cuba. Meanwhile, the three 727-100s were replaced by second-hand McDonnell Douglas DC-9-30 purchased from Continental Airlines and Alitalia.

=== Operational mishaps and restructuring (1993–2005) ===
During the first years of operations, AeroRepública's reputation became tarnished due to constant mechanical problems with its ageing fleet, low punctuality, and mismanagement. Furthermore, the airline was grounded by Colombia's Aerocivil for two weeks in May 1997, due to safety reasons. The airline's board of directors reversed the situation by restructuring its business processes, launching a new corporate image, acquiring a fleet of McDonnell Douglas MD-80s, eliminating unprofitable routes, and adding the slogan "Live the Change" on advertisements.

=== Acquisition by Copa Airlines and expansion (2005–present) ===
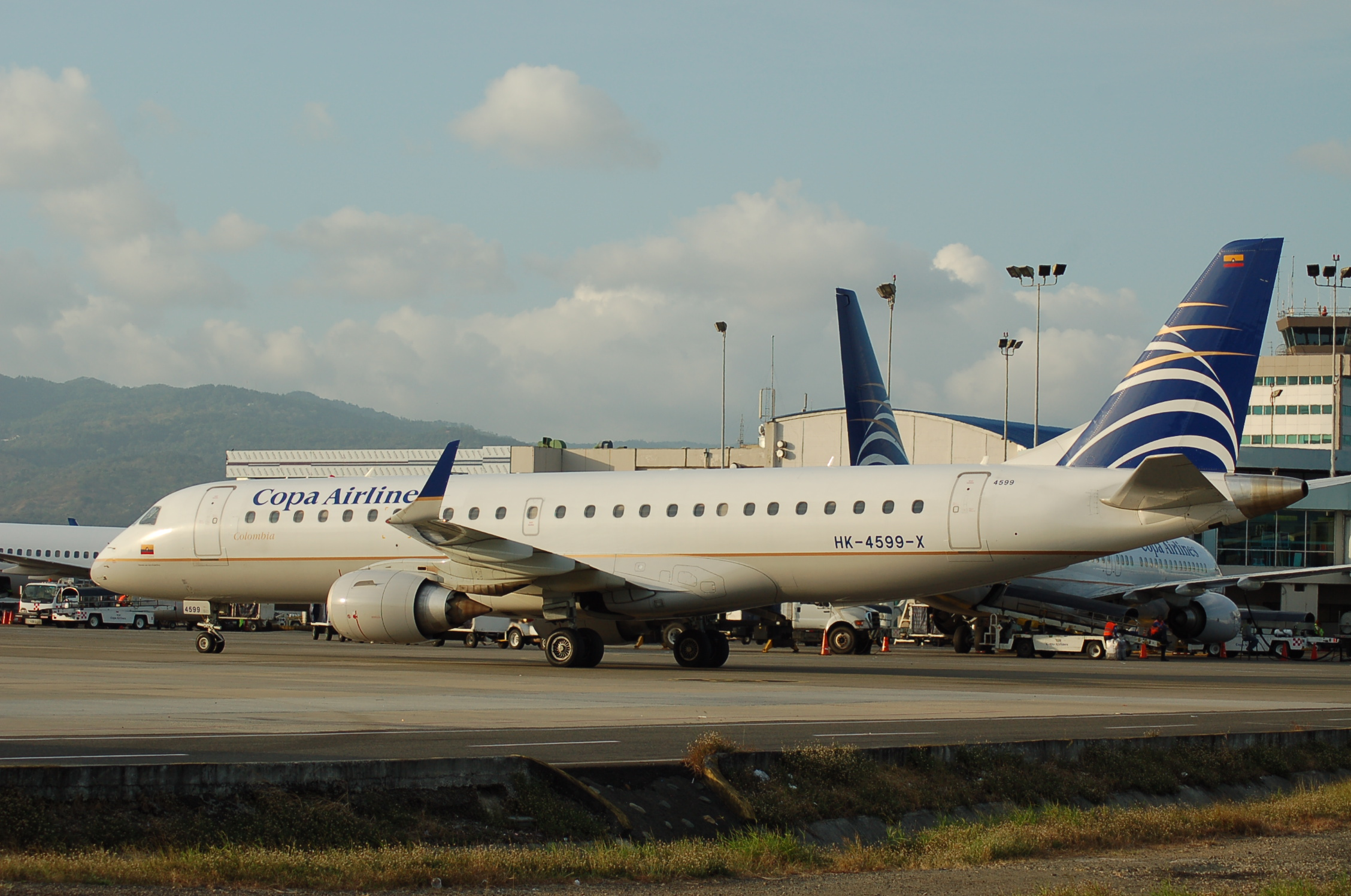
An Embraer 190LR of Copa Airlines Colombia at Tocumen International Airport in 2011

In 2005, Panama's flag carrier, Copa Airlines, wanted to enter the Colombian market. After negotiating for several companies, including entering the auction for bankrupt Avianca, Copa acquired 90% of AeroRepública. With this acquisition, AeroRepública was completely transformed. The former president of the airline's board, Alfonso Avila Velandia, resigned and was succeeded by Roberto Junguito. AeroRepública adopted a corporate image similar to Copa's and Continental's (now United) and began the retirement of the MD-80 fleet, in favor of the more efficient Embraer 190 and Boeing 737-700 aircraft.

In early 2007, an AeroRepública Embraer 190 took off from Enrique Olaya Herrera Airport, in Medellín, for a demonstration flight, although current regulations do not allow that type of aircraft to operate from/to that airport. In addition, domestic routes were consolidated and international services to Quito, Caracas, Panama City, Mexico, and elsewhere were launched, and service to Miami, São Paulo and other cities was planned.

In 2010, Copa Holdings changed the airline's name from AeroRepública to Copa Airlines Colombia, thus unifying the brand.

On 20 October 2016, Copa Holdings announced the creation of Wingo, a new low-cost airline operating under Copa Airlines Colombia, which will serve domestic and international routes and replace the Copa Airlines Colombia brand, which had been losing money for several years, and had lost $29.7 million in the first half of 2016. The new airline started operations on 1 December 2016, with a fleet of four Boeing 737-700s, each with a 142-seat all-Economy configuration.

Since March 2020, Copa Airlines Colombia no longer has its own fleet. Its flights are currently operated with the Copa Airlines fleet through fleet exchange agreements.

Former logo (2006–2010)

== Fleet ==
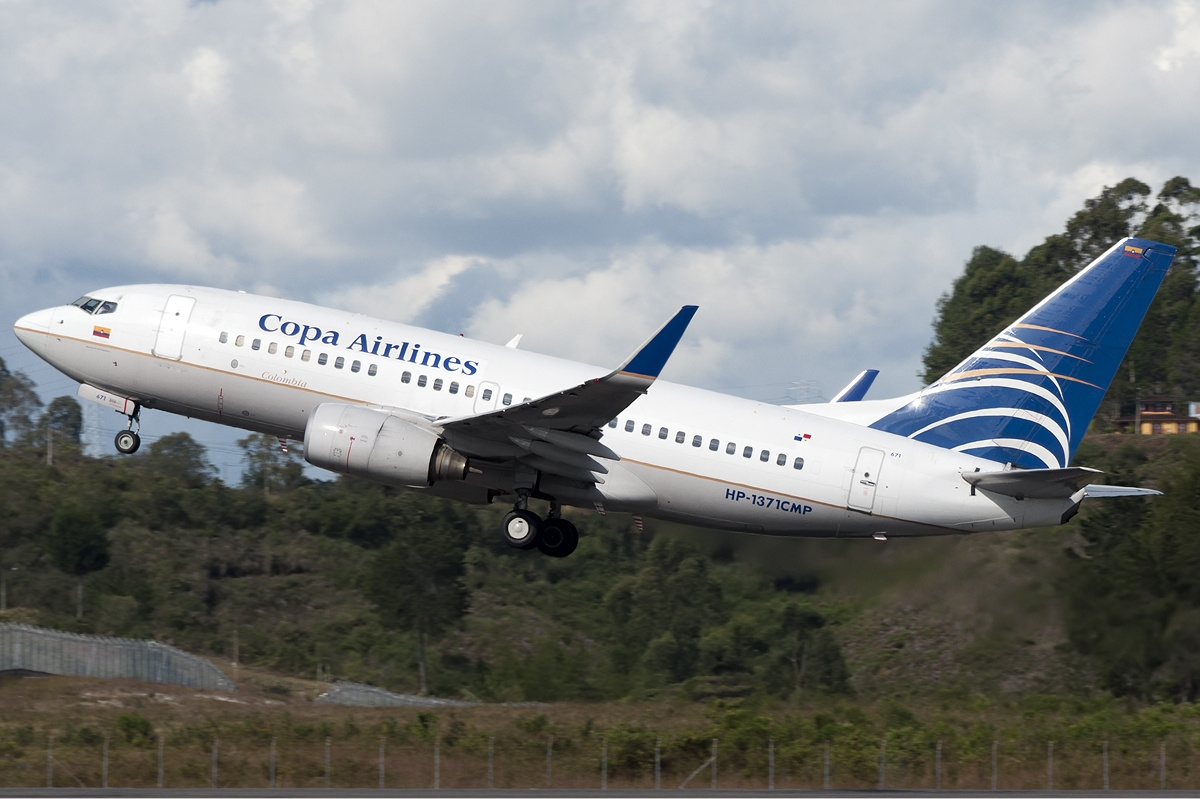
A former Boeing 737-700 of Copa Airlines Colombia taking off at José María Córdova International Airport in 2011

As of July 2026, Copa Airlines Colombia operates the following aircraft:

Aircraft	In service	Orders	Passengers
Boeing 737-800	9	—	
Total	9	—	

== ConnectMiles ==
ConnectMiles is Copa Airlines Colombia's frequent-flyer program, through a partnership with Copa Airlines. Customers accumulate miles from flight segments flown on Copa Airlines Colombia, Copa Airlines, and other Star Alliance member airlines. Benefits of Premier status include priority check-in, priority boarding, complimentary upgrades, and discounted airport lounge memberships (United Club/Copa Club). Due to the Continental-United merger, Copa Airlines Colombia phased out the OnePass frequent flyer program on 31 December 2011, and adopted the MileagePlus program on 3 March 2012.

In March 2015, Copa Airlines announced that it would phase out the MileagePlus program in favor of ConnectMiles. The new program was fully implemented on 1 July 2015.

== Accidents and incidents ==
- On 4 December 2002, a McDonnell Douglas DC-9-31 (registration HK-4230X) had an incident while taking off from Bogotá due to the pilots raising the nose of the plane excessively, causing the tail to hit. Upon arriving in Barranquilla, the maintenance personnel examined the magnitude of the damage, and upon returning to Bogotá, the plane was seen in total loss by Aerocivil and Boeing.
- On 8 January 2005, a McDonnell Douglas MD-83 (registration VP-BGI) overran the runway at Cali's Alfonso Bonilla Aragón International Airport, and the landing gear was torn off. There were no fatalities among the 6 crew and 164 passengers. The aircraft was written off.
- On 17 July 2007, an Embraer 190LR (registration HK-4455) operating as Flight 7330, overshot the runway at Simón Bolívar International Airport in Santa Marta, went down an embankment and came to rest with its nose in the ocean. There were no fatalities. Due to the extensive damage, the aircraft was written off Making it the first hull loss of any Embraer E-Jet family aircraft.
- On 2 November 2007, an Embraer 190, which covered the Pereira-Bogotá route, had to return to the Matecaña International Airport when smoke spread through the fuselage, 15 passengers panicked and it was explained that in less than 10 minutes after the plane took off this accident occurred, fortunately no one was seriously injured. The pilots said this had occurred due to a failure in the aircraft's air conditioning system.

== See also ==
- List of airlines of Colombia
