= Air Panamá Internacional =

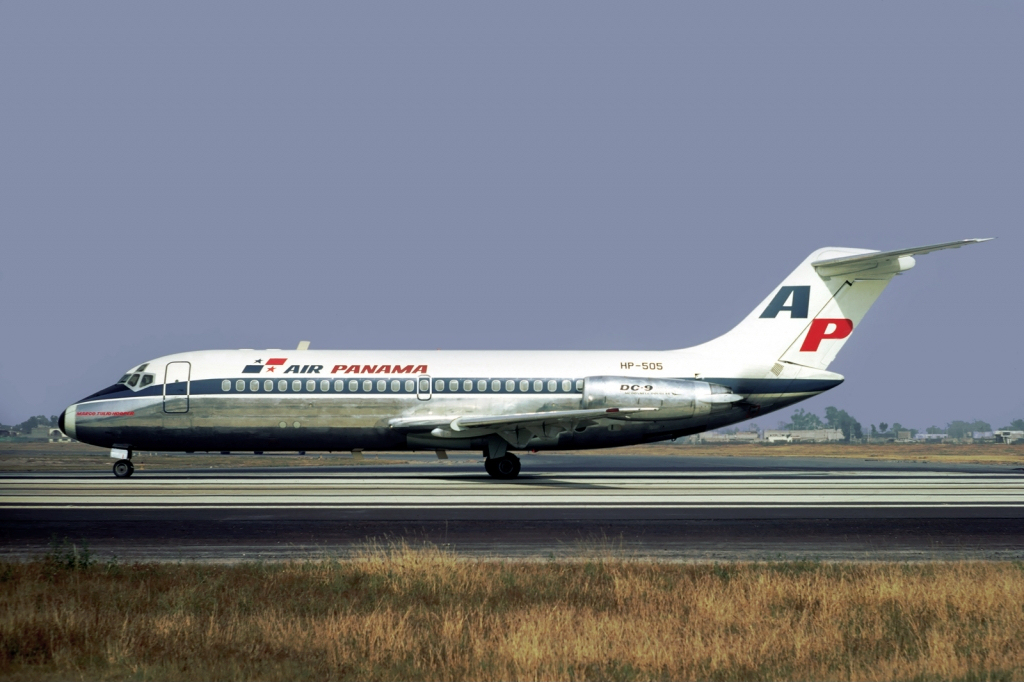
IATA	ICAO	Call sign
OP	API	ARPA
- Founded: 1967
- Commenced operations: August 24, 1969
- Ceased operations: December 2, 1990
- Hubs: Tocumen International Airport
- Fleet size: 2
- Destinations: 11
- Parent company: Government of Panama (100%)
- Headquarters: Panama City, Panama

Air Panamá Internacional (also known as simply just Air Panama) was a state owned airline from Panama that served as the flag carrier of the country between 1968 and 1989. From its hub at Tocumen International Airport in Panama City, scheduled passenger flights to a number of destinations in the Americas was offered.

== History ==
Air Panamá Internacional was founded in 1967 as a joint venture between the government of Panama (67%) and Spanish airline Iberia (33%). When Iberia pulled out approximately ten years later, the airline became fully state-owned.

During the 1980s, when Panama was ruled by military dictator Manuel Noriega, the route network and aircraft fleet of Air Panamá went into decline because of the worsened financial and economic situation of the company, which led to Copa Airlines emerging as the largest airline of the country. All flight operations with Air Panamá Internacional ceased in December 1989 over the United States invasion of Panama. The only aircraft of the airline at that time, a leased Boeing 727. In January 1990, Air Panamá Internacional declared bankruptcy and ceased operations on December 2, 1990.

On July 11, 1991, there was an attempt by the government of Panama to relaunch the airline in summer of 1992 as Panama Air International with two Boeing 757s wet-leased from Avensa. However, this attempt failed. In 2005, Turismo Aéreo acquired the Air Panama branding and adopted its trademark rights.

== Destinations ==
During the 1970s and early 1980s, Air Panamá Internacional offered scheduled flights to the following destinations:

Argentina

- Buenos Aires - Ministro Pistarini International Airport

Colombia

- Bogotá - El Dorado International Airport

Ecuador

- Guayaquil - José Joaquín de Olmedo International Airport

Guatemala

- Guatemala City - La Aurora International Airport

Mexico

- Mexico City - Mexico City International Airport

Panama

- Panama City - Tocumen International Airport Hub

Peru

- Lima - Jorge Chávez International Airport

United States

- Los Angeles - Los Angeles International Airport
- Miami - Miami International Airport
- New York City - John F. Kennedy International Airport

Venezuela

- Caracas - Simón Bolívar International Airport

== Fleet ==
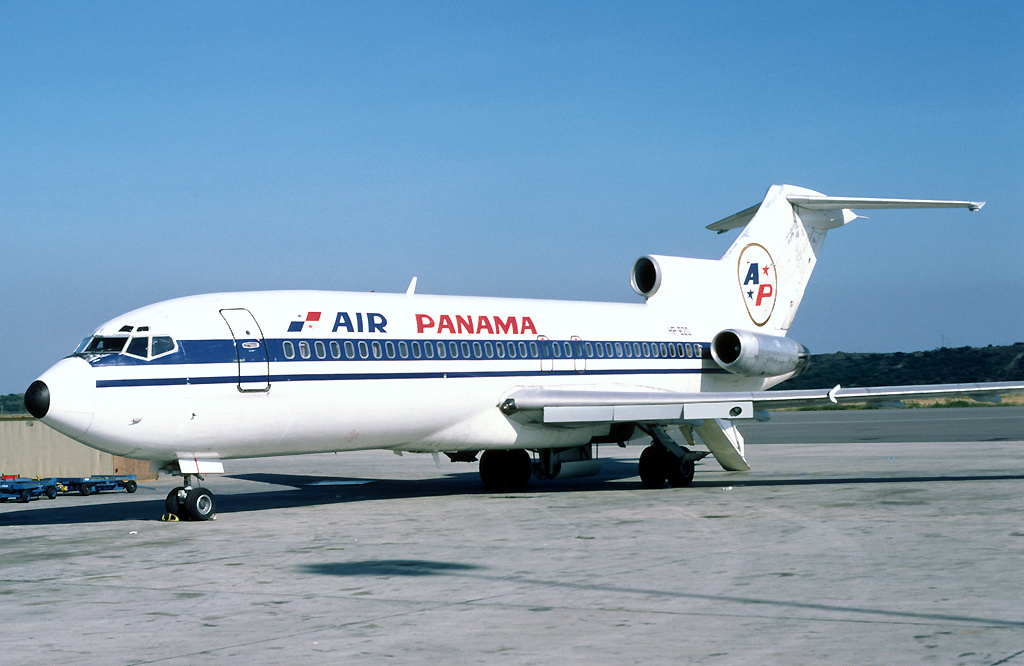
An Air Panamá Boeing 727-100

Over the years, Air Panamá Internacional operated the following aircraft types:

Air Panamá Internacional fleet
Aircraft	Total	Introduced	Retired	Notes
Boeing 727-100	6	1972	1990	
Boeing 727-200	1	1986	1988	Leased from Royal Jordanian Airlines
Boeing 727-200	1	1989	1990	Leased from Faucett Perú, later disappeared while flying with Faucett
McDonnell Douglas DC-9-15	1	1969	1972	Leased from McDonnell Douglas
McDonnell Douglas DC-10-10	1	1985	1985	Leased from Arrow Air
McDonnell Douglas DC-10-40	2	1984	1986	Leased from Jet 24

== See also ==
- List of defunct airlines of Panama
