= Wingo (airline) =

Colombian-based airline

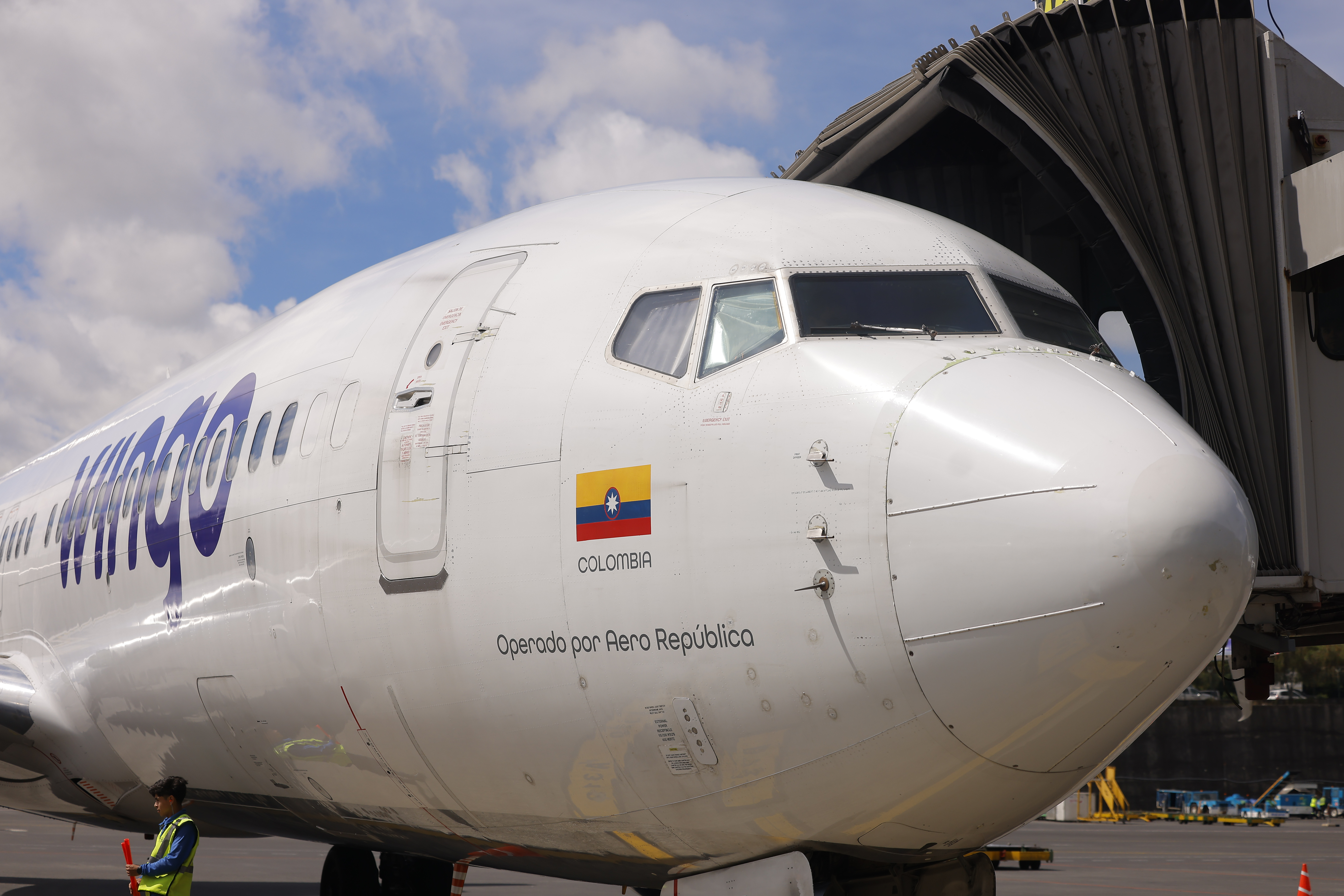
- Boeing 737-800
IATA	ICAO	Call sign
P5	RPB	AEROREPUBLICA
- Founded: 19 October 2016
- Commenced operations: 1 December 2016
- Operating bases: Barranquilla; Bogotá; Cali; Cartagena; Panama City–Balboa; San Andrés
- Frequent-flyer program: ConnectMiles
- Subsidiaries: Wingo Panama
- Fleet size: 9
- Destinations: 23
- Parent company: Copa Holdings
- Headquarters: Bogotá, Colombia
- Key people: Eduardo Lombana (CEO)
- Website: www.wingo.com/en

AeroRepública, S. A., trading as Wingo, is a low-cost airline owned by Copa Holdings. Copa announced the creation of Wingo in October 19, 2016 as a replacement for most of its Copa Airlines Colombia business, which had been losing money for several years, and which had lost $29.7 million in the first half of 2016. In November 2019, Wingo announced Carolina Cortizo as their appointed managing director.

== History ==
Copa said in 2016, that Wingo would be led by Catalina Bretón, a former JetBlue and Avianca executive, and that Eduardo Lombana, the CEO of Copa Colombia, would be in charge of the airline's administration, finance and operations. Copa said Wingo would use four Boeing 737-700s previously used by Copa, would fly under Copa Colombia's call sign and codes, and would mostly take over Copa Colombia's routes, adding flights from Bogotá and Medellín to Panama Pacifico International Airport. The new company would offer one class of seats and would charge for baggage, food and beverages, seat assignments, and priority boarding.

Wingo commenced operations on December 1, 2016, with a flight from Bogotá to Cancún. It had a fleet of four Boeing 737-700s.

== Fleet ==
=== Current fleet ===
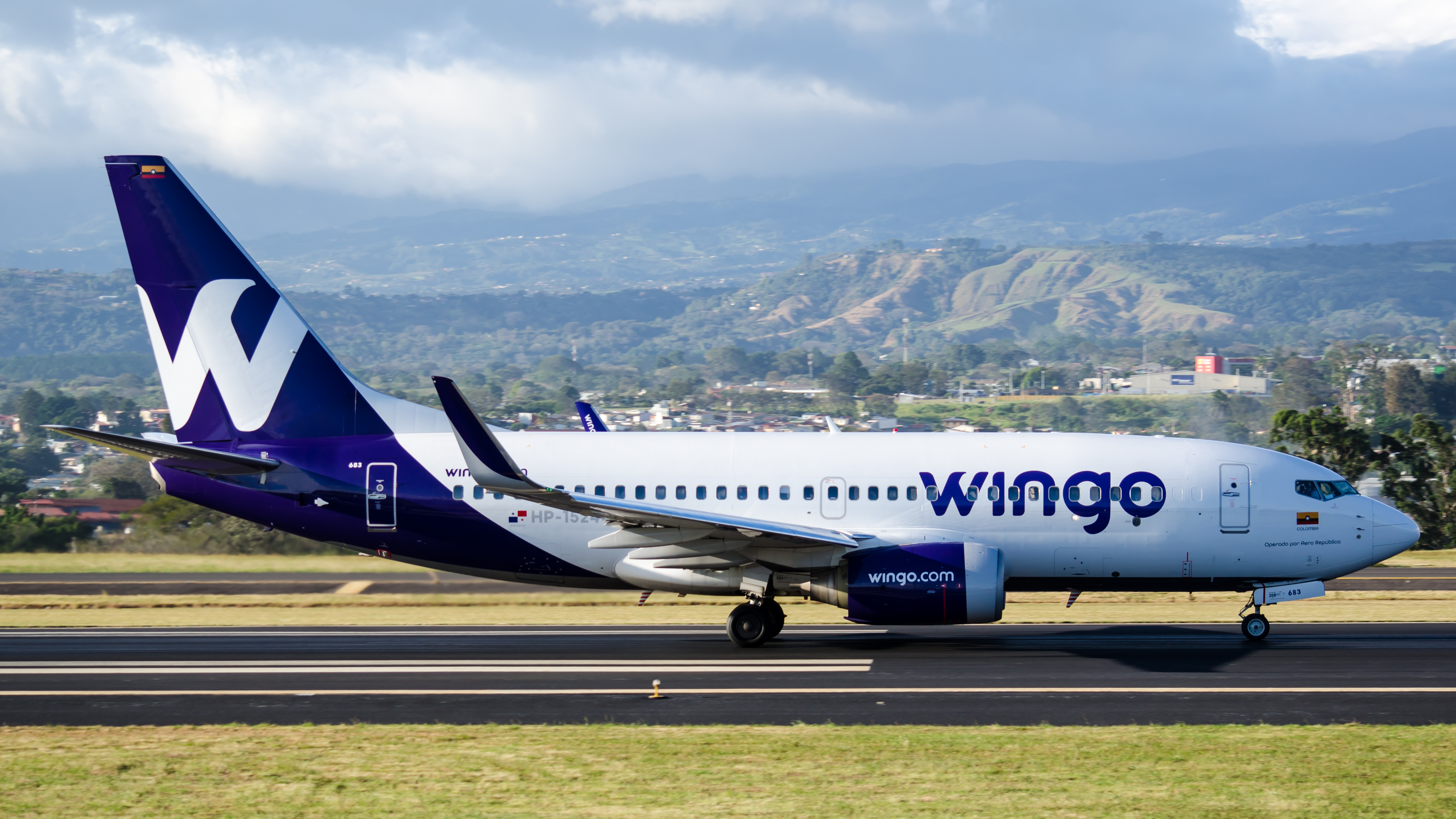
A former Wingo Boeing 737-700 at Juan Santamaría International Airport in 2017

As of August 2025, Wingo operates the following aircraft:

Wingo fleet
Aircraft	In service	Orders	Passengers	Notes
Boeing 737-800	9	—	186	
Total	9	0		

== See also ==
- List of airlines of Colombia
