= Alas Chiricanas =

Commuter airline in Panama, 1980–1995

IATA	ICAO	Call sign
—	AHC	ALAS CHIRICANAS
- Founded: 1980
- Ceased operations: 1995
- Hubs: Enrique Malek International Airport
- Headquarters: David, Chiriquí, Panama

Alas Chiricanas S.A. (Spanish: Chiriquí Wings) was a commuter airline based in Panama, which was operational from 1980 to 1995.

== Fleet ==
Their fleet contained Embraer EMB 110 Bandeirantes, although they also operated the De Havilland Canada Dash 7 in fierce competition with regional Aeroperlas.

== Accidents and incidents ==
On July 19, 1994, Alas Chiricanas Flight 00901 crashed on a wooded hillside following an in-flight explosion while en route from Colón to Panama City, killing all 18 passengers and 3 crew. The explosion was caused by a bomb.

After the accident, the company went out of business, and Aeroperlas absorbed part of its fleet.

== See also ==
- List of defunct airlines of Panama
