= Copa Airlines =

National airline of Panama

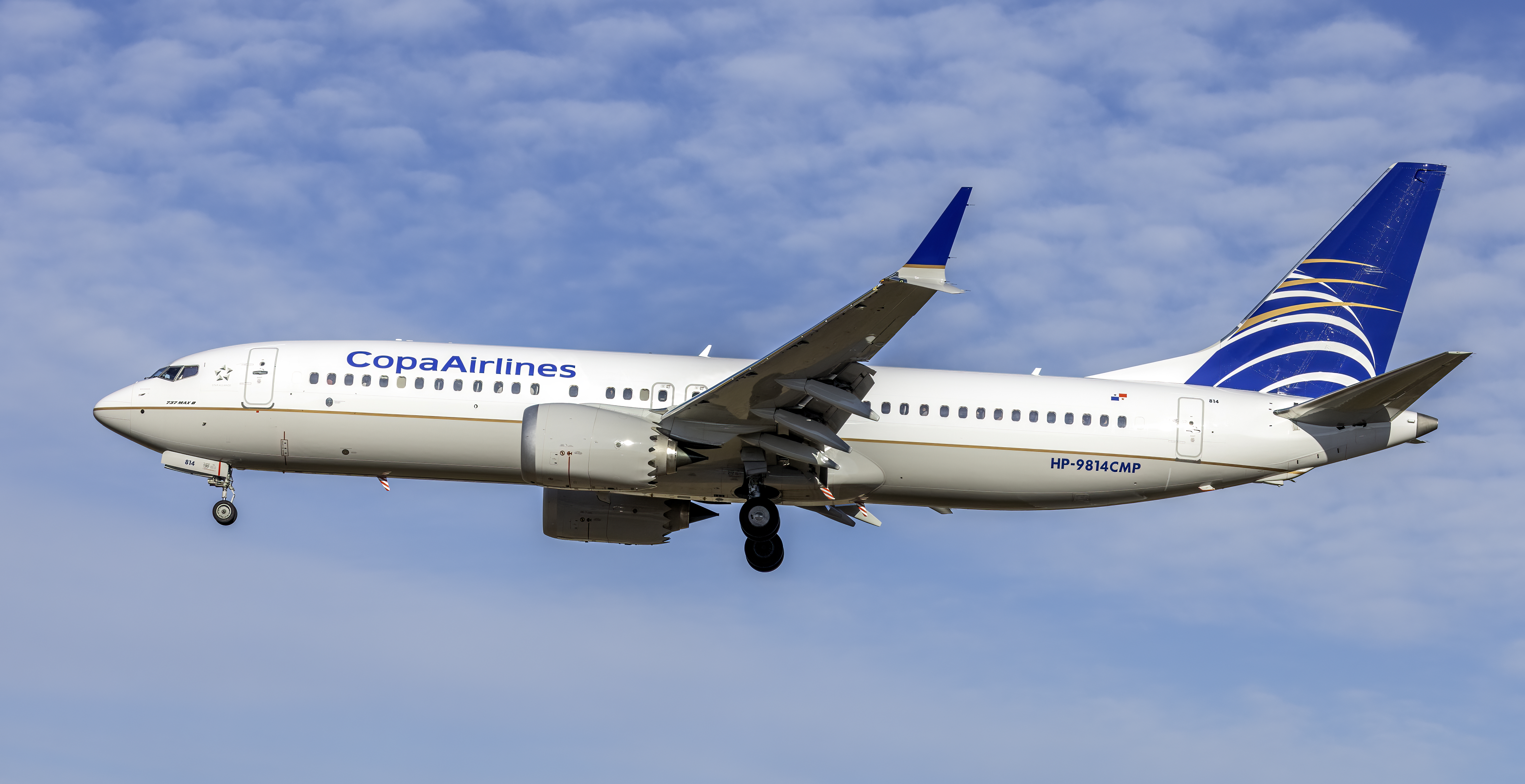
- Copa Airlines Boeing 737 MAX
IATA	ICAO	Call sign
CM	CMP	COPA
- Founded: 21 June 1944; 82 years ago
- Commenced operations: 15 August 1947; 79 years ago
- AOC #: DCIF003F
- Hubs: Panama City–Tocumen
- Focus cities: San José (CR)
- Frequent-flyer program: ConnectMiles
- Alliance: Star Alliance
- Fleet size: 107
- Destinations: 89
- Parent company: Copa Holdings
- Headquarters: Panama City, Panama
- Key people: Pedro Heilbron (CEO)
- Employees: 9,450 (2018)
- Website: copaair.com/en

Compañía Panameña de Aviación, S.A., branded as Copa Airlines, is the flag carrier of Panama and a member of the Star Alliance. It is headquartered in Panama City, with its main hub at Tocumen International Airport. The airline is owned by Copa Holdings, which also owns Colombian airline AeroRepública, which operates under the brands Wingo and Copa Airlines Colombia.

Copa was founded in 1947 and it began domestic operations to three cities in Panama shortly afterwards. The airline abandoned its domestic operations in 1980, in favor of international flights. In 1998, Copa formed a partnership with Continental Airlines, adopting a similar brand image.

== History ==
=== Inauguration ===
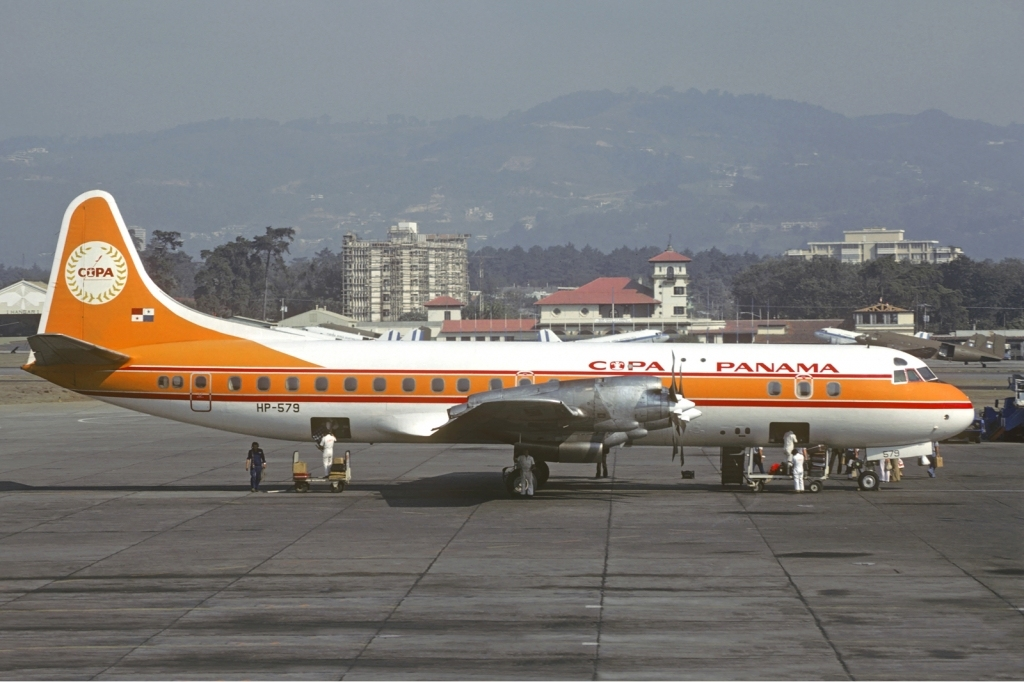
A Copa Airlines Lockheed L-188 Electra at La Aurora International Airport in 1980

On June 21, 1944, Panamanian investors joined forces with Pan American World Airways (Pan Am) to launch Compañía Panameña de Aviación (Spanish for 'Panamanian Aviation Company'), soon known simply by its acronym, Copa. Pan Am took a 32% stake in the company. Operations started on August 15, 1947, with three Douglas C-47 aircraft on domestic routes in Panama. The 1960s marked Copa's entry into the international arena, offering flights to Costa Rica, Jamaica, and Colombia. Pan Am divested its stake in Copa in 1971, leaving the airline under Panamanian control.

The 1980s saw a strategic shift for Copa as they discontinued domestic flights to focus solely on international travel and acquired its first jet, a Boeing 737-100. Until the early 1980s, the airline had significant competition from Air Panamá Internacional, which had a higher profile.

=== Expansion years ===
Expansion continued during the 1990s, when it began service to Buenos Aires, Argentina; Santiago, Chile; Bogotá, Colombia; Havana, Cuba; Guayaquil, Ecuador; Lima, Peru; Mexico City, Mexico; Caracas, Venezuela; and many other important Latin American cities.

In 1992, Copa Airlines signed a strategic alliance with TACA Airlines (now Avianca El Salvador), and the airline began flying from Tocumen International Airport, making it the first flight connection center in Latin America. As a result, Tocumen was dubbed the "Hub of the Americas" and several Latin American airlines such as LACSA of Costa Rica, Aviateca of Guatemala and NICA of Nicaragua joined the alliance. The alliance ended in 1998 when the six-year agreement expired.

A defining moment arrived in 1998 with a significant investment by Continental Airlines. This led to the formation of Copa Holdings, a holding company for Copa Airlines, which was 49% owned by Continental. The investment also included a strategic alliance, fostering code-sharing, marketing initiatives, and technical collaboration. Since then, Copa's fleet has grown significantly, boasting 97 aircraft as of 2023. Copa has adopted a livery and corporate logo similar to Continental's (now United). Copa participated in the OnePass frequent flyer program until Continental's merger with United Airlines. Continental gradually reduced its ownership, eventually exiting entirely by 2008.

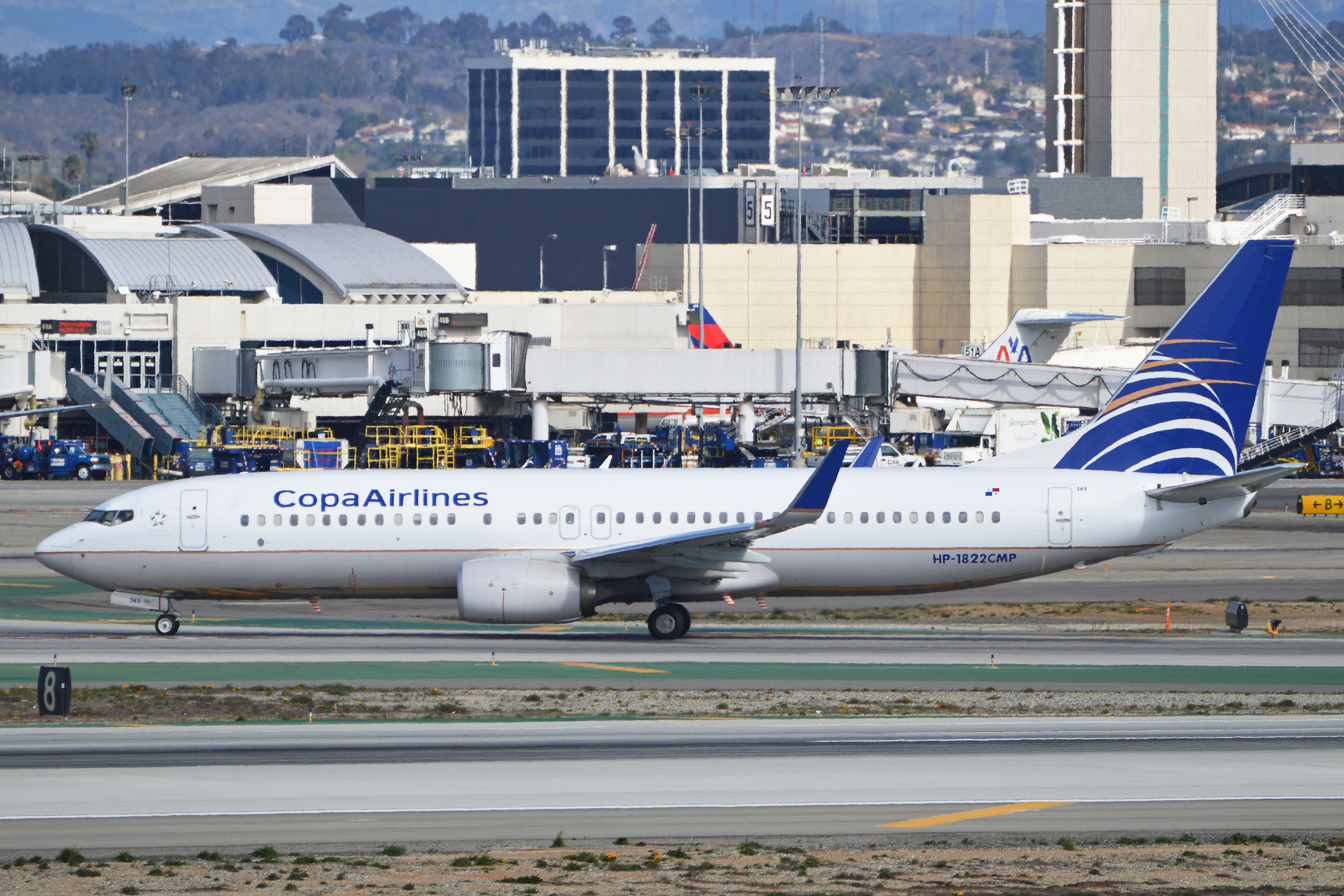
Since 1980, the Boeing 737 has been a backbone for the medium-long haul expansion of Copa Airlines. Pictured; a Boeing 737-800 at LAX.

In 2000, Copa Airlines inaugurated service to Los Angeles, Cancún, and Orlando, as well as to São Paulo; in 2001, it began service to Quito, Ecuador. In 2004, it began service to John F. Kennedy International Airport in New York City. Copa also announced in August of that year a codeshare agreement with Mexico's Mexicana de Aviación, which lasted until 2007.

On June 1, 2005, Copa Airlines acquired 90% of the Colombian domestic air carrier AeroRepública, having earlier announced a codeshare plan with the carrier. Copa rebranded AeroRepública to Copa Airlines Colombia in 2010, increased destinations and modernized the fleet. On December 15, 2005, parent company Copa Holdings, S.A., launched an IPO of 14 million shares on the New York Stock Exchange thus becoming the fourth Latin American airline to be traded on the exchange, after LAN Airlines of Chile and Brazilian carriers Gol Transportes Aéreos and TAM Airlines.

In 2006, Copa Airlines began service to six new destinations: Manaus, Brazil; Maracaibo, Venezuela; Montevideo, Uruguay; Rio de Janeiro, Brazil; San Pedro Sula, Honduras; and Santiago de los Caballeros, Dominican Republic. In addition, Copa Airlines took delivery of six Embraer 190s and two Boeing 737s. In 2007, Copa Airlines added services to Córdoba, Argentina; Guadalajara, Mexico; Punta Cana, Dominican Republic; and Washington, D.C. Copa Airlines added four Embraer 190s and two Boeing 737s (-800 series). That same year, the airline joined the SkyTeam alliance as an associate member.

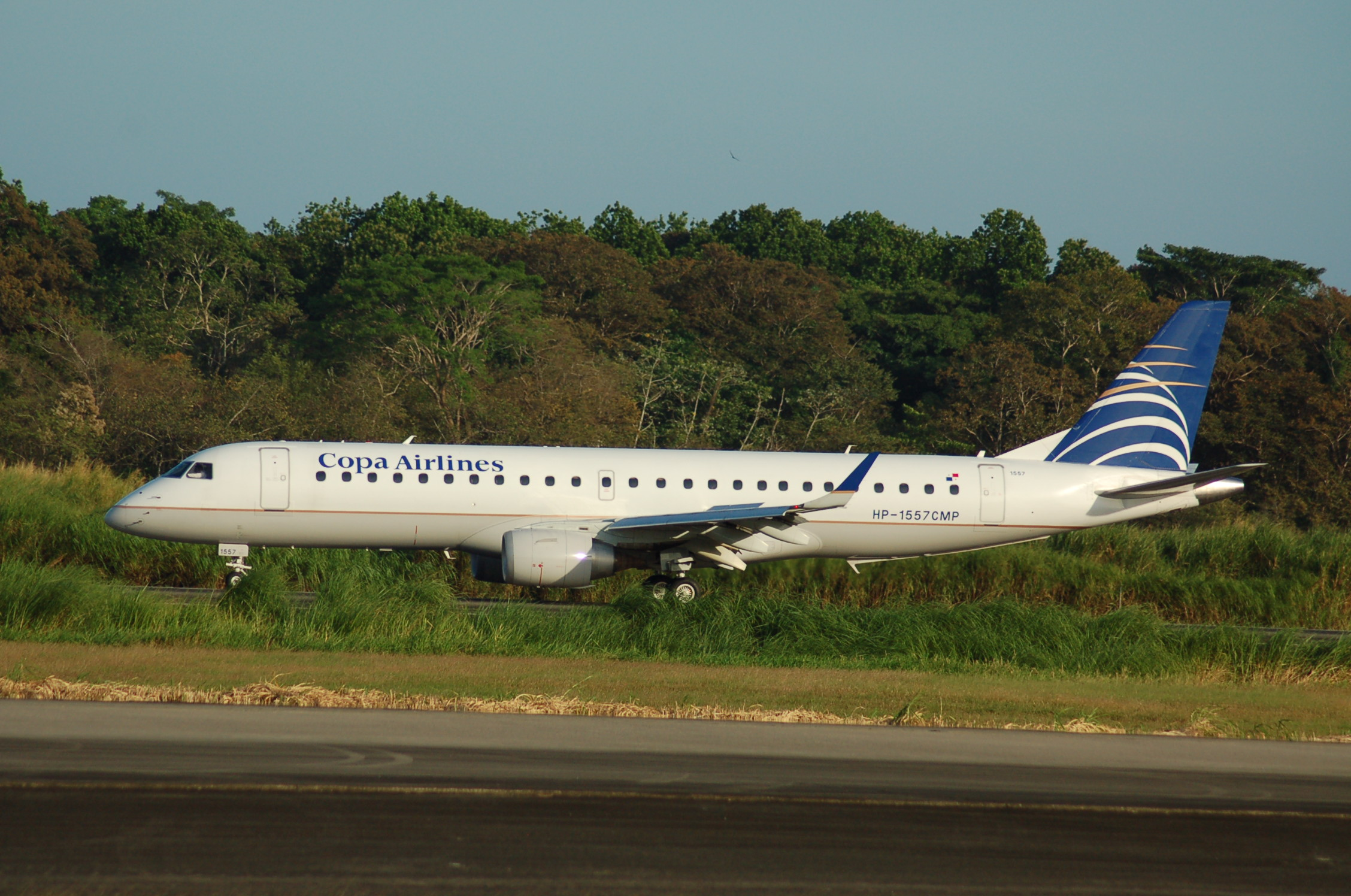
Embraer 190, mainly deployed for regional flights across Central America and Colombia

During 2008, Copa Airlines added five new destinations and received four Embraer 190s and one Boeing 737-800. The new destinations are Port of Spain, Trinidad and Tobago; Belo Horizonte, Brazil; Valencia, Venezuela; Oranjestad, Aruba; and Santa Cruz de la Sierra, Bolivia. In May 2008, Continental Airlines sold its remaining 4.38 million shares of Copa Airlines for $35.75 a share, yielding a net profit of approximately $149.8 million.

That same year, Copa Airlines' CEO Pedro Heilbron announced on the ALTA airline leaders forum in Cancún that the airline had decided to leave SkyTeam and were in exclusive talks with Star Alliance.

In 2009, Copa Airlines announced it would withdraw from SkyTeam on October 24, the same date that partner Continental Airlines left the alliance. The company added two Boeing 737-800s. and announced a firm order for 13 Boeing 737-800s with the new Boeing signature "Sky Interior".

In 2010, Copa Airlines began service to St. Maarten, received nine Boeing 737-800s and announced that it would join Star Alliance in mid-2012 to rejoin old partner Continental Airlines (now United). That same year, Copa Airlines announced a firm order to purchase 32 Boeing 737-800 planes valued at $1.7 billion, thus becoming the largest plane order in the airline's history. The Boeing 737-800 are set for delivery between 2015 and 2018, with an option to acquire ten additional 737-800 aircraft.

In 2011, Copa Airlines began service to Toronto; Brasília and Porto Alegre, Brazil; Chicago; Cúcuta, Colombia; Montego Bay, Jamaica; Monterrey, Mexico and Asunción, Paraguay; and Nassau, The Bahamas. It also passed from a four bank hub to a six bank hub and increased frequencies to several destinations.

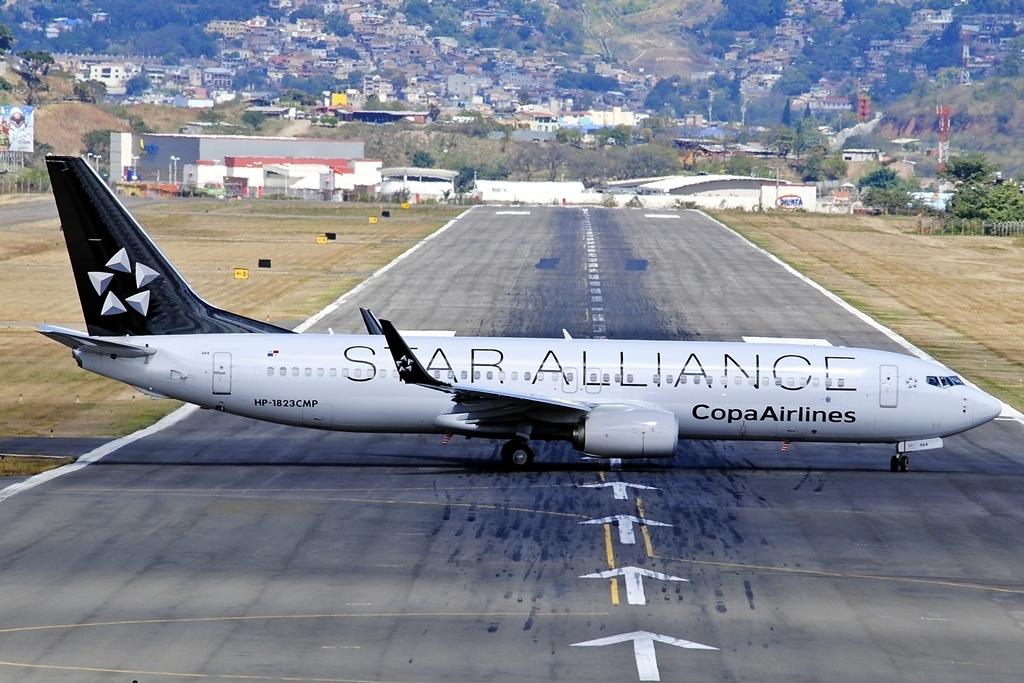
In June 2012, Copa Airlines became one of the first Latin American airlines to enter Star Alliance.

That same year, Copa Airlines launched a mobile version of its website (m.copaair.com), giving passengers the chance to get a mobile pass and check flight status and other services. Additionally, the airline announced a new codeshare agreement with TAME, which became effective in January 2012. Copa Airlines also became the first airline in Latin America to have the new Boeing 737-800NG Sky Interior with improved performance in its fleet.

In 2012, the company announced five new destinations: Las Vegas, United States; Recife, Brazil; Willemstad, Curaçao; Liberia, Costa Rica; and Iquitos, Peru. In June of the same year, Copa Airlines became an official member of Star Alliance along with AviancaTaca.

Copa also increased flight frequencies to several destinations and inaugurated an interline agreement with Air Panama (Panama's second-largest airline) which consists of the linkage of all tourist destinations in Panama with those in Latin America. The agreement became effective June 1, 2012, when Air Panama began flights from Tocumen airport to Isla Colón, Bocas del Toro.

In 2013, Copa increased the frequency to several destinations and included two new destinations in the United States: Boston and Tampa.

Aviation Partners Boeing (APB) announced on 10 October 2013, that Copa Airlines placed an order to retrofit some of its existing Boeing Next Generation 737s' blended winglets with APB's new split scimitar winglets, as part of its environmental strategy. The new APB winglet technology will save Copa more than $21 million in jet fuel costs fleetwide and more than 63,000 tons of carbon dioxide CO_{2} outputs per year.

In January 2014, Copa Airlines announced three new destinations and revealed its business strategy for the year, which included the delivery of eight new Boeing 737-800 aircraft and the increase of flight frequencies to some destinations. The new destinations are Montreal, Canada; Fort Lauderdale, United States and Georgetown, Guyana. In July, it added Campinas, Brazil; and Santa Clara, Cuba. In April 2014, Copa Airlines became the first airline in Latin America and the third in the world to implement the Split Scimitar Winglets on its Boeing 737NG fleet.

In January 2015, the airline achieved a milestone in its history when it re-launched daily domestic flights to David, Chiriquí, the first ones since the closure of the route three decades earlier. Also, Copa Airlines announced new flights to Villahermosa and Puebla, Mexico; and New Orleans, United States. Three months later, the airline announced another new destination In the U.S: San Francisco, California, United States. In July 2015, Copa Airlines announced service to Belize City which began in December 2015.

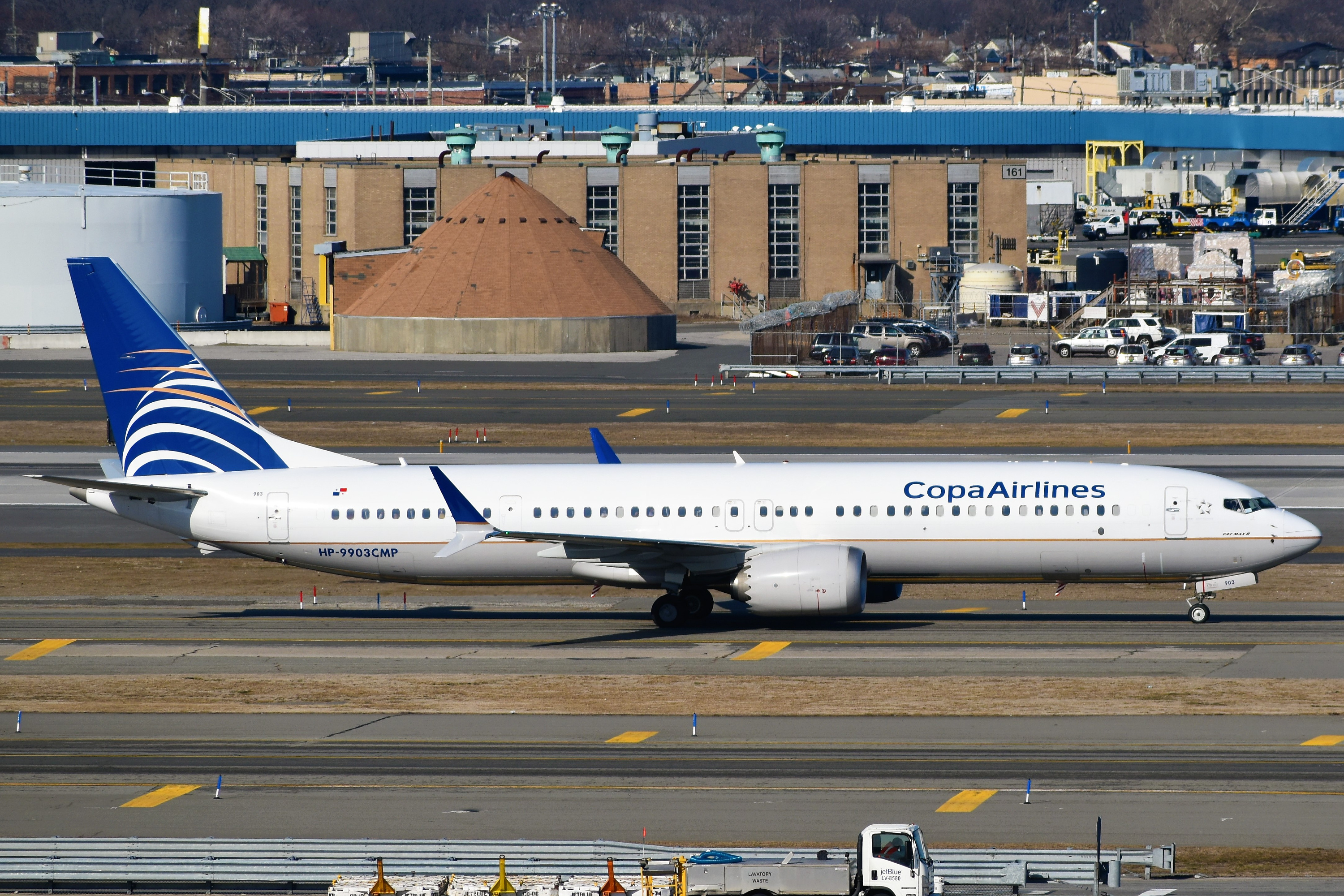
Copa Airlines is Latin America's first Boeing 737 MAX 9 operator.

In April 2015, the airline announced an order for 61 Boeing 737 MAX aircraft worth $6.6 billion at list price.

On June 21, 2016, the airline started flights to Holguín. On June 28, 2016, the airline started flights to Chiclayo. On July 1, 2016, the airline started flights to Rosario.

In December 2016, Wingo, a Colombia based low cost airline owned by Copa, began operations.

On November 15, 2017, the airline started flights to Mendoza, Argentina. On December 11, 2017, the airline started flights to Denver, United States.

On January 29, 2018, Copa Airlines announced that it would start flights to Bridgetown, Barbados on July 17, 2018; Fortaleza, Brazil on July 18, 2018; and Salvador da Bahia, Brazil on July 24, 2018.

On December 12, 2018, the airline started flights to Salta, Argentina. On December 16, 2018, the airline started flights to Puerto Vallarta, Mexico.

On January 17, 2019, the airline announced flights to Paramaribo, Suriname; which commenced on July 6, 2019.

On December 2, 2021, the airline started flights to Armenia, Colombia. On December 6, 2021, the airline restarted flights to Cúcuta, Colombia. On December 12, 2021, the airline started flights to Atlanta, United States.

On June 28, 2022, the airline started flights to Santa Marta, Colombia. On June 30, 2022, the airline started flights to Barcelona, Venezuela. On September 26, 2022, the airline started flights to Mexico City's new secondary airport, Felipe Ángeles International Airport.

On June 27, 2023, the airline started flights to Manta, Ecuador. On June 28, 2023, the airline started flights to Baltimore, Maryland. On July 6, 2023, the airline started flights to Austin, Texas. On October 17, 2023, the airline started flights to Barquisimeto, Venezuela. On June 21, 2024, the airline started flights to Raleigh, North Carolina. On June 25, 2024, the airline started flights to Florianopolis, Brazil. On June 26, 2024, the airline started flights to Tulum, Mexico.

On July 31, 2024, the airline was forced to suspend its flights to Venezuela in response to the 2024 Venezuelan political crisis.

On June 25, 2025, the airline started flights to San Diego, California.

== Corporate affairs ==
The key trends for Copa Airlines are (as of the financial year ending 31 December):

	Revenue (Note: total operating revenue) (US$ m)	Net profit (US$ m)	Number of employees	Number of passengers (m)	Load factor (%)	Number of destinations	Number of served countries	Fleet size	Ref.
2012	2,163	326	8,277	10.2	75.4	64	29	83	
2013	2,519	427	8,644	11.3	76.7	66	29	90	
2014	2,619	361	9,267	11.6	76.7	69	30	98	
2015	2,253	−240	9,302	11.8	75.2	73	31	100	
2016	2,219	323	8,733	12.8	80.4	73	31	99	
2017	2,521	362	9,045	14.2	83.2	75	31	106	
2018	2,677	88.1	9,450	15.1	83.4	80	32	105	
2019	2,707	247	8,877	15.4	84.8	80	33	102	
2020	760	−607	5,667		79.6	54	25	77	
2021	1,412	43.8	6,127	9.5	78.6	69	29	91	
2022	2,965	348	7,265	15.7	85.1	78	32	97	
2023	3,457	514	7,625		86.8	82	32	106	
2024	3,446	608	7,909		86.3	82	32	112	

== Destinations ==
As of March 2026, Copa Airlines serves 88 destinations in 32 countries across North America, Central America, South America, and the Caribbean. The airline operates its primary hub at in Panama City.

The following is a list of destinations served by Copa Airlines:

Country	City	Airport	Notes	Ref.
Argentina	Buenos Aires	Ministro Pistarini International Airport		
Argentina	Córdoba	Ingeniero Aeronáutico Ambrosio L.V. Taravella International Airport		
Argentina	Mendoza	Governor Francisco Gabrielli International Airport		
Argentina	Rosario	Rosario – Islas Malvinas International Airport		
Argentina	Salta	Martín Miguel de Güemes International Airport		
Argentina	Tucumán	Teniente General Benjamín Matienzo International Airport		5
Aruba	Oranjestad	Queen Beatrix International Airport		
Bahamas	Nassau	Lynden Pindling International Airport		
Barbados	Bridgetown	Grantley Adams International Airport		
Belize	Belize City	Philip S. W. Goldson International Airport		
Bolivia	Santa Cruz de la Sierra	Viru Viru International Airport		
Brazil	Belo Horizonte	Tancredo Neves International Airport		
Brazil	Brasília	Brasília International Airport		
Brazil	Florianópolis	Hercílio Luz International Airport		
Brazil	Manaus	Eduardo Gomes International Airport		
Brazil	Porto Alegre	Salgado Filho International Airport		
Brazil	Rio de Janeiro	Rio de Janeiro/Galeão International Airport		
Brazil	Salvador	Deputado Luís Eduardo Magalhães International Airport		
Brazil	São Paulo	São Paulo/Guarulhos International Airport		
Canada	Montreal	Montréal–Trudeau International Airport		
Canada	Toronto	Toronto Pearson International Airport		
Chile	Santiago	Arturo Merino Benítez International Airport		
Colombia	Armenia	El Edén International Airport	Suspended	
Colombia	Barranquilla	Ernesto Cortissoz International Airport		
Colombia	Bogotá	El Dorado International Airport		
Colombia	Bucaramanga	Palonegro International Airport		
Colombia	Cali	Alfonso Bonilla Aragón International Airport		
Colombia	Cartagena	Rafael Núñez International Airport		
Colombia	Cúcuta	Camilo Daza International Airport		
Colombia	Medellín	José María Córdova International Airport		
Colombia	Pereira	Matecaña International Airport		
Colombia	San Andrés	Gustavo Rojas Pinilla International Airport		
Colombia	Santa Marta	Simón Bolívar International Airport		
Costa Rica	Liberia	Guanacaste Airport	Terminated	
Costa Rica	San José	Juan Santamaría International Airport		
Cuba	Havana	José Martí International Airport		
Cuba	Holguín	Frank País Airport	Terminated	
Cuba	Santa Clara	Abel Santamaría Airport	Terminated	
Curaçao	Willemstad	Curaçao International Airport		
Dominican Republic	Puerto Plata	Gregorio Luperón International Airport		
Dominican Republic	Punta Cana	Punta Cana International Airport		
Dominican Republic	Santiago de los Caballeros	Cibao International Airport		
Dominican Republic	Santo Domingo	Las Américas International Airport		
Ecuador	Guayaquil	José Joaquín de Olmedo International Airport		
Ecuador	Manta	Eloy Alfaro International Airport		
Ecuador	Quito	Mariscal Sucre International Airport		
El Salvador	San Salvador	El Salvador International Airport		
Guatemala	Guatemala City	La Aurora International Airport		
Guyana	Georgetown	Cheddi Jagan International Airport		
Honduras	Comayagua	Palmerola International Airport		
Honduras	San Pedro Sula	Ramón Villeda Morales International Airport		
Honduras	Tegucigalpa	Toncontín International Airport	Terminated	
Jamaica	Kingston	Norman Manley International Airport		
Jamaica	Montego Bay	Sangster International Airport		
Mexico	Cancún	Cancún International Airport		
Mexico	Guadalajara	Guadalajara International Airport		
Mexico	Los Cabos	Los Cabos International Airport		
Mexico	Mexico City	Mexico City International Airport		
Mexico	Mexico City	Felipe Ángeles International Airport	Suspended	
Mexico	Monterrey	Monterrey International Airport		
Mexico	Tulum	Tulum International Airport	Suspended	
Nicaragua	Managua	Augusto C. Sandino International Airport		
Panama	David	Enrique Malek International Airport		
Panama	Panama City	Tocumen International Airport	Hub	
Paraguay	Asunción	Silvio Pettirossi International Airport		
Peru	Chiclayo	FAP Captain José Abelardo Quiñones González International Airport		
Peru	Lima	Jorge Chávez International Airport		
Puerto Rico	San Juan	Luis Muñoz Marín International Airport		
Sint Maarten	Philipsburg	Princess Juliana International Airport		
Suriname	Paramaribo	Johan Adolf Pengel International Airport		
Trinidad and Tobago	Port of Spain	Piarco International Airport		
United States	Atlanta	Hartsfield–Jackson Atlanta International Airport		
United States	Austin	Austin-Bergstrom International Airport		
United States	Baltimore	Baltimore/Washington International Airport		
United States	Boston	Logan International Airport		
United States	Chicago	O'Hare International Airport		
United States	Denver	Denver International Airport		
United States	Fort Lauderdale	Fort Lauderdale–Hollywood International Airport		
United States	Las Vegas	Harry Reid International Airport		
United States	Los Angeles	Los Angeles International Airport		
United States	Miami	Miami International Airport		
United States	New Orleans	Louis Armstrong New Orleans International Airport	Terminated	
United States	New York City	John F. Kennedy International Airport		
United States	Orlando	Orlando International Airport		
United States	Raleigh	Raleigh–Durham International Airport		
United States	San Diego	San Diego International Airport		
United States	San Francisco	San Francisco International Airport		
United States	Tampa	Tampa International Airport		
United States	Washington, D.C.	Dulles International Airport		
Uruguay	Montevideo	Carrasco International Airport		
Venezuela	Barcelona	General José Antonio Anzoátegui International Airport		
Venezuela	Barquisimeto	Jacinto Lara International Airport		
Venezuela	Caracas	Simón Bolívar International Airport		
Venezuela	Maracaibo	La Chinita International Airport		
Venezuela	Valencia	Arturo Michelena International Airport		

=== Codeshare agreements ===
Copa Airlines codeshares with the following airlines:

- Air Europa
- Air France
- All Nippon Airways
- Asiana Airlines
- Avianca
- Azul Brazilian Airlines
- Emirates
- EVA Air
- Gol Linhas Aéreas Inteligentes
- Iberia
- KLM
- Lufthansa
- Turkish Airlines
- United Airlines
- Volaris

== Fleet ==
=== Current fleet ===
As of June 2025, Copa Airlines operates an all-Boeing 737 fleet composed of the following aircraft:

Copa Airlines fleet
Aircraft	In service	Orders	Passengers					Notes
Aircraft	In service	Orders	J	W	Y+	Y	Total	Notes
Boeing 737-700	9	—	12	—	—	114	126	
Boeing 737-800	58	—	16	—	24	120	160	
Boeing 737-800	58	—	16	—	24	126	166	
Boeing 737 MAX 8	6	16	16	24	—	126	166	The number of aircraft per variant has yet to be determined.
Boeing 737 MAX 9	32	16	16	24	—	126	166	The number of aircraft per variant has yet to be determined.
Boeing 737 MAX 9	32	16	12	24	—	138	174	The number of aircraft per variant has yet to be determined.
Boeing 737 MAX 10	—	15	TBA					
Copa Airlines Cargo Fleet
Boeing 737-800BCF	2	—	Cargo					Operated by Wingo Panama.
Total	107	31						

Current fleet

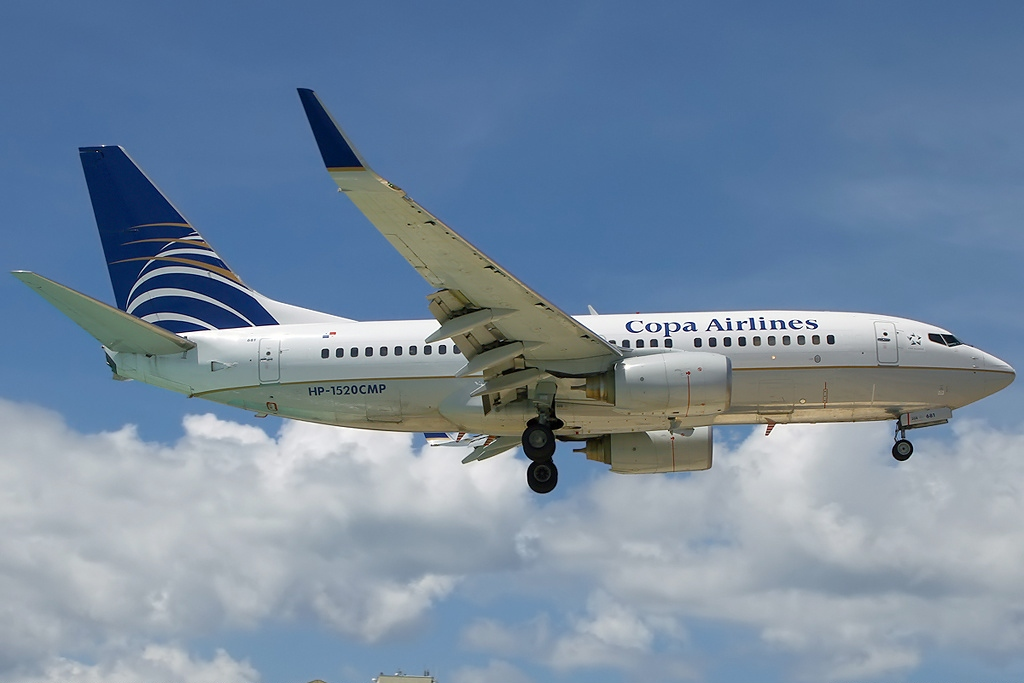
Boeing 737-700

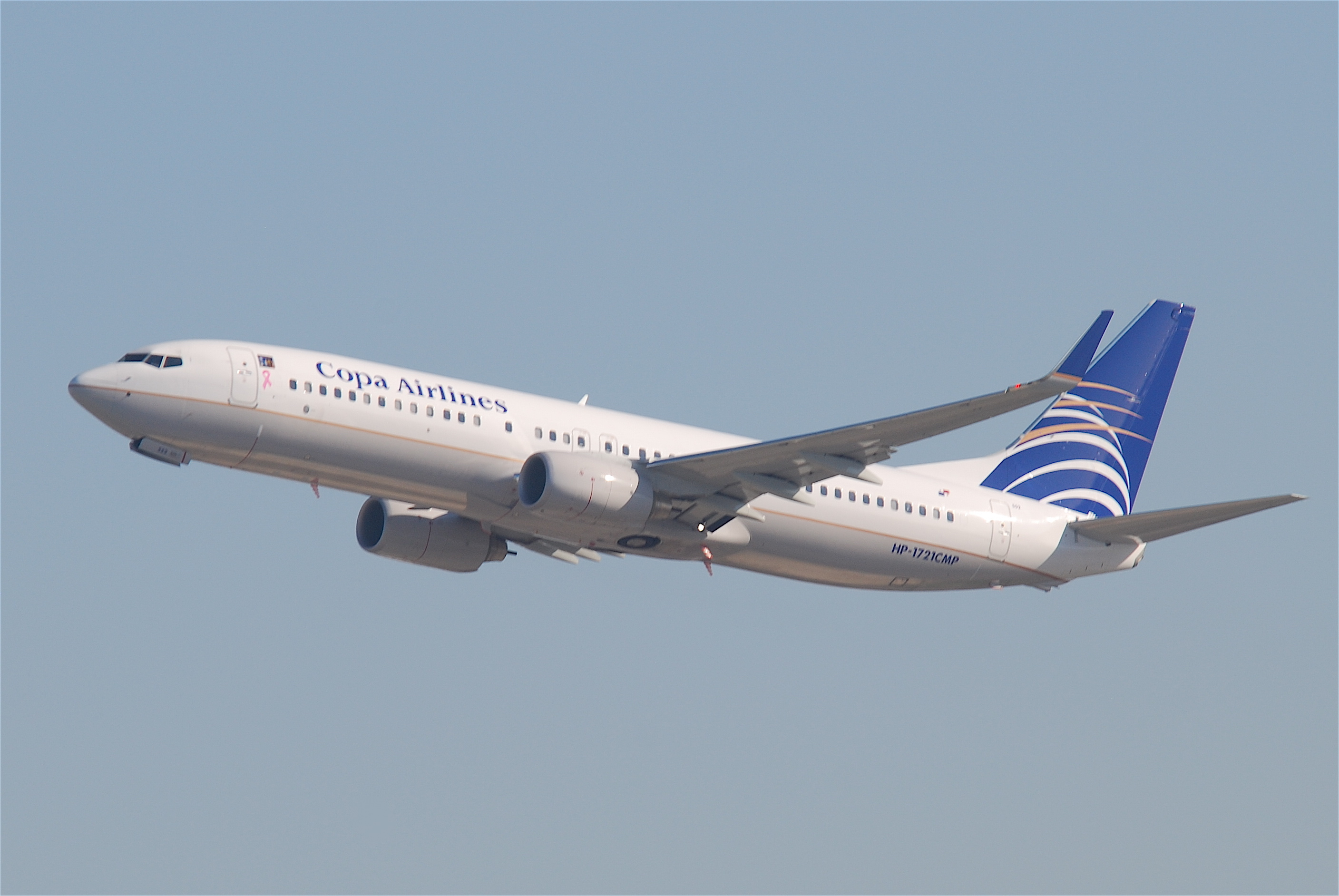
Boeing 737-800

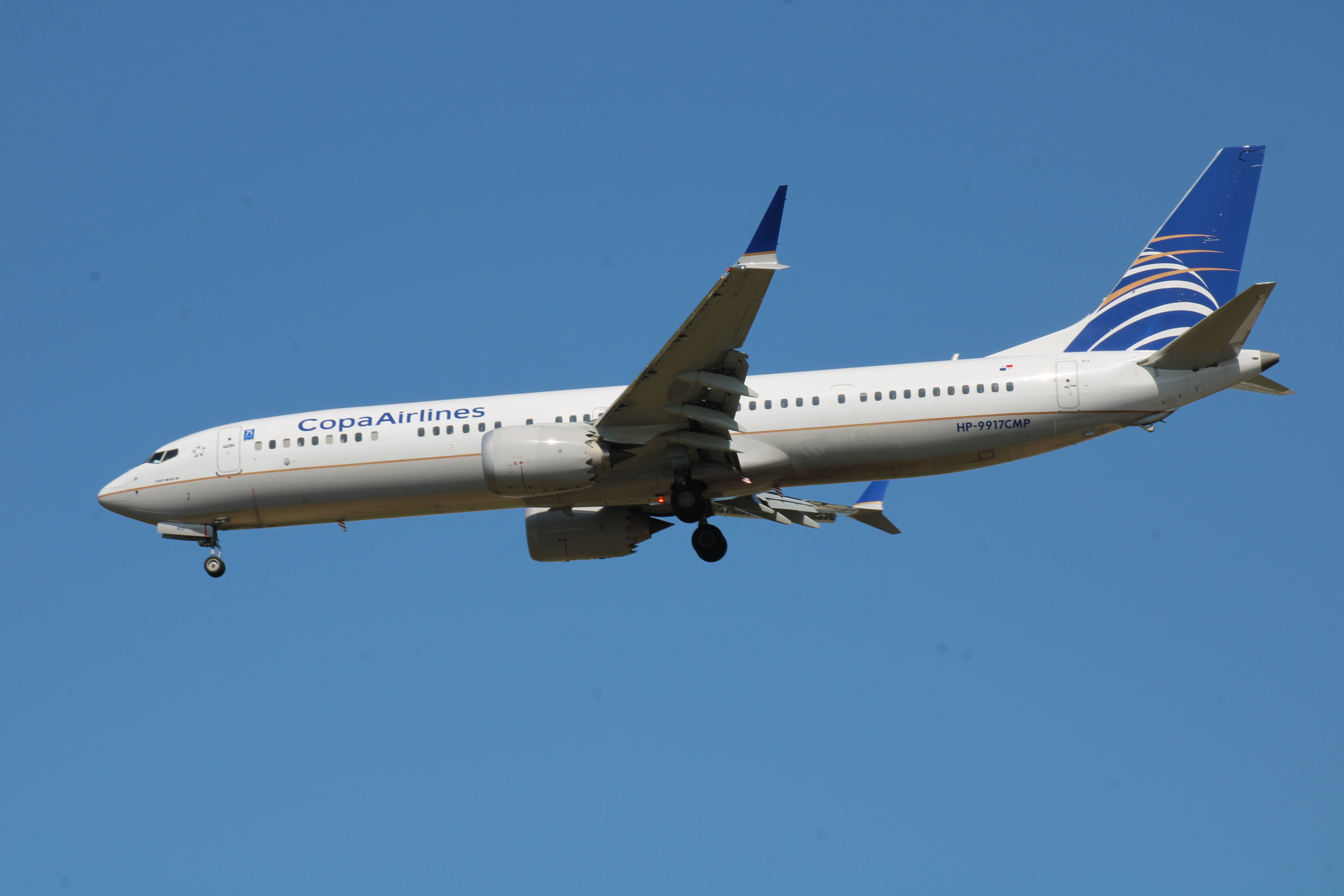
Boeing 737 MAX 9

=== Former fleet ===
Copa Airlines formerly operated the following aircraft:

Copa Airlines former fleet
Aircraft	Total	Introduced	Retired	Notes
Boeing 707-320C	1	1993	1994	
Boeing 727-100	1	1985	1987	Leased from Evergreen International Airlines.
Boeing 737-100	1	1980	1980	Leased from Air Florida.
Boeing 737-100	1	1988	1993	Written off as Flight 301.
Boeing 737-200	21	1988	2005	
Boeing 737-200	1	1988	1992	Crashed as Flight 201.
Convair CV-240	1	1968	1969	
Convair CV-340	1	1968	1974	
Curtiss C-46 Commando	3	1956	1960	
Douglas C-47 Skytrain	3	1947	1982	
Douglas DC-6B	1	1981	1982	
Embraer 190AR	15	2005	2020	Leased from Alliance Airlines.
Hawker Siddeley HS 748	2	1969	1978	
Lockheed L-188A Electra	3	1971	1986	
Martin 4-0-4	1	1961	1965	

== Liveries ==
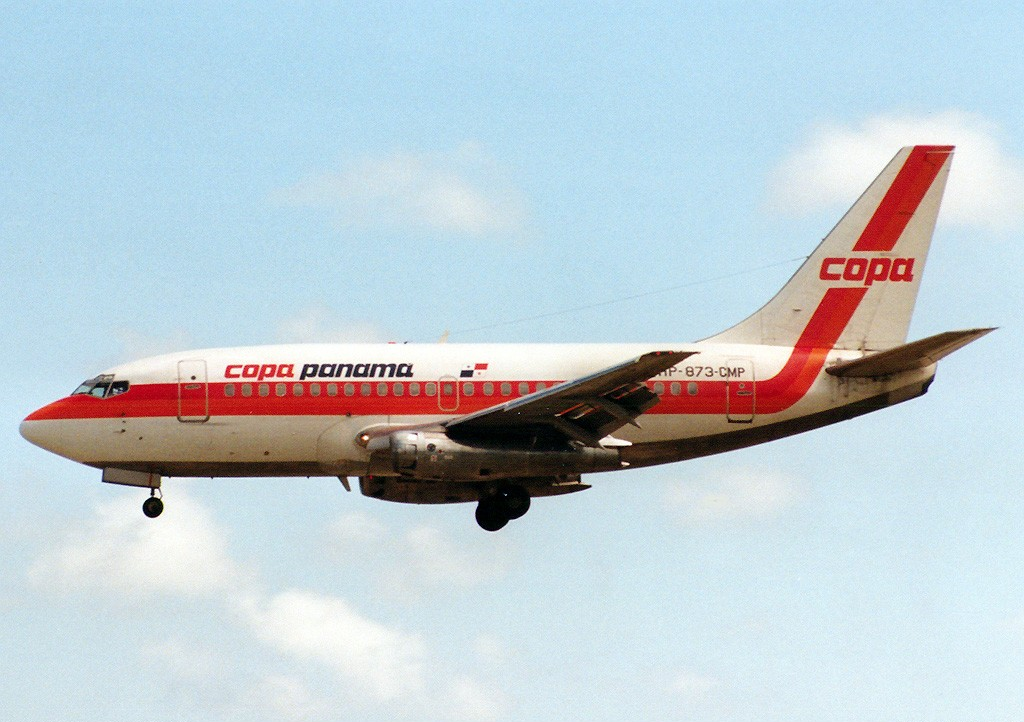
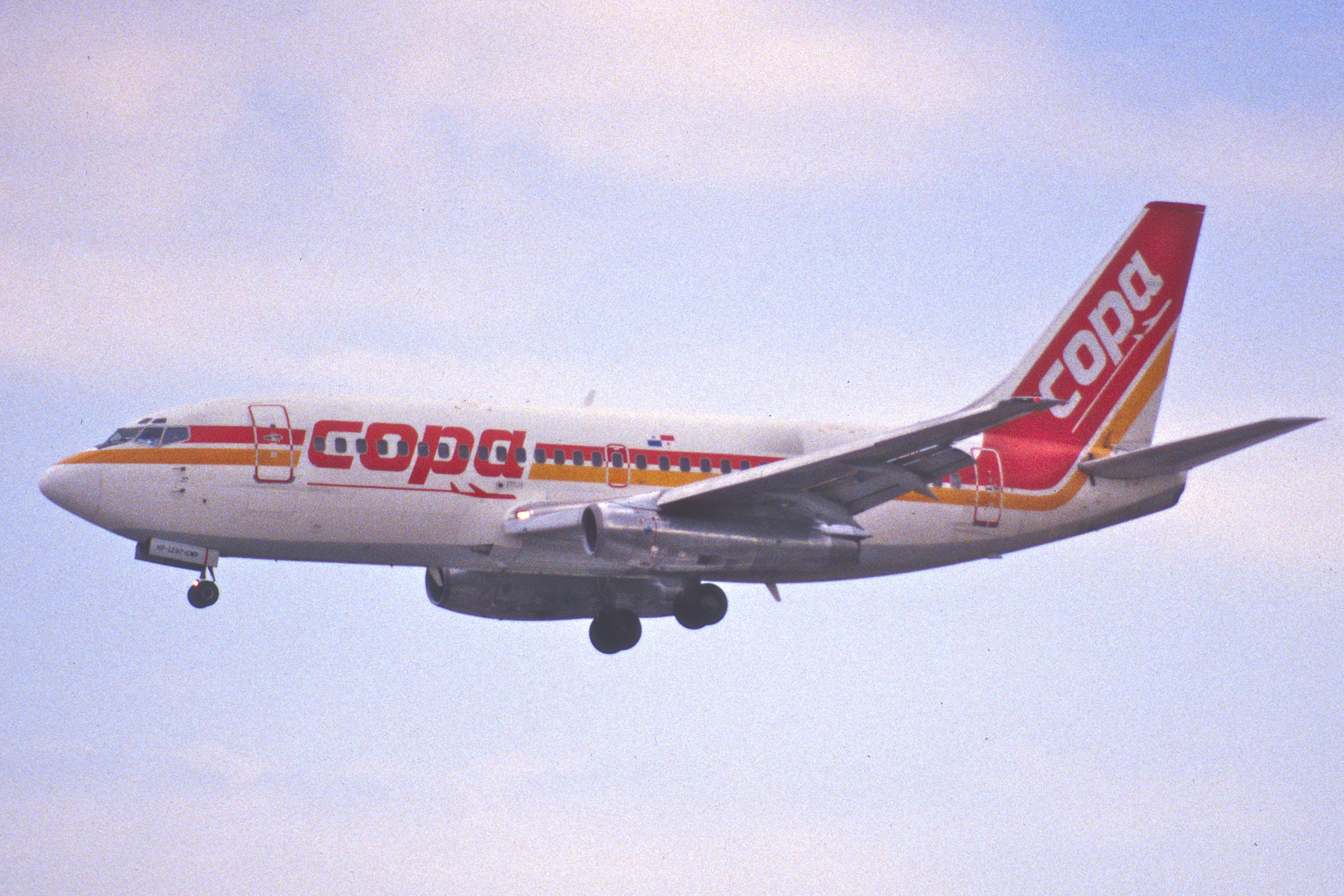
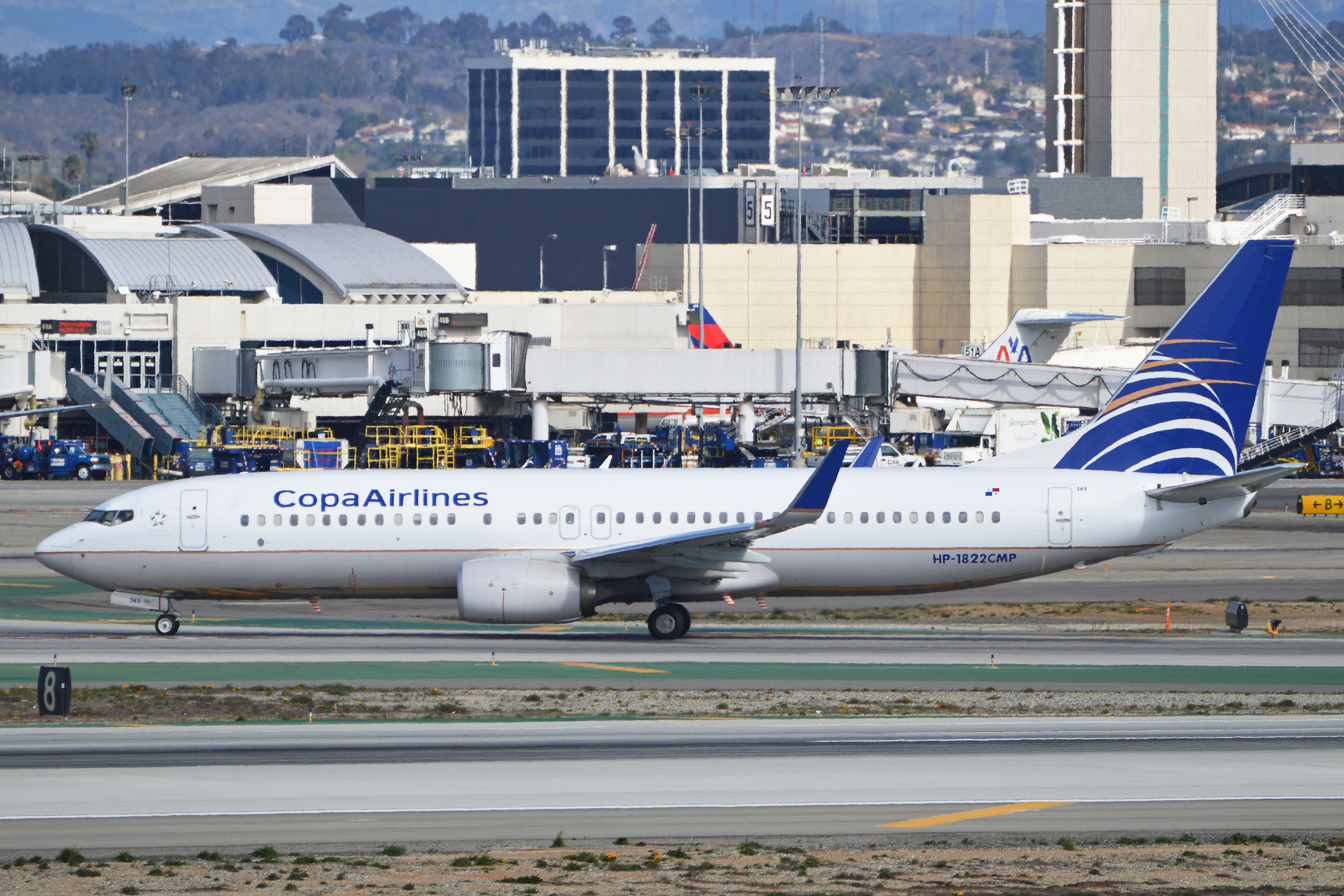
Copa Airlines has used these liveries on their aircraft.

Since its founding in 1947, Copa Airlines used several liveries during the update of its fleet from turboprops to jetliners. Also, it has special liveries within its fleet. In November 2003, in honor of the 100th anniversary of the Republic of Panama, Copa Airlines adorned its fleet of Boeing 737-700s with a special livery depicting the official centennial logo and portrait of the first president of Panama, Manuel Amador Guerrero.

On 6 March 2012, a new Copa Airlines Boeing 737-800 (registered HP-1728CMP) carried the Star Alliance livery. Also, it introduced a redesigned font style in the Copa Airlines' logo. This plane was inactive until 21 June, when it was exhibited in the celebration of the company's official integration to Star Alliance. The aircraft began service six days later, making the first scheduled non-stop passenger flight from Panama to Las Vegas. On 30 May 2012, another new Boeing 737-800 (registered HP-1823CMP) received the Star Alliance livery.

Copa received a new Boeing 737-800 (registered HP-1825CMP) in October 2012, sporting a livery depicting Frank Gehry's Biomuseo, a museum that opened in Panama City in October 2013.

In March 2013, a newly built Boeing 737-800 for Copa Airlines (registered HP-1830CMP) was painted with the Star Alliance livery scheme. This was the third aircraft in the fleet with the former Star Alliance livery.

In August 2014, Copa Airlines worked with the Panama Canal Authority to launch a special campaign in honor of the 100th anniversary of the Panama Canal. The campaign included the implementation of a special livery, which has a graphic image of the locks, on the back of two Boeing 737-800 aircraft and is expected to be implemented on more than 40 aircraft of the fleet.

From 1947 to present, Copa Airlines has used the following liveries:

- Compañia Panameña de Aviación (1947–1961)
- Vuele Copa (1961–1965)
- Copa Panama (original) - White fuselage with a red or green cheatline (1965–1971)
- Copa Panama (1st upgrade) - Red and orange cheatline with white fuselage (1971–1980)
- Copa Panama (2nd upgrade) - Red and yellow cheatline with white fuselage (1980–1990)
- Copa "Billboard Style" - Red and yellow cheatline with white fuselage, and "Copa" logo in the front part of the widebody and tail (1990–1999)
- Copa Airlines (original) - White and gray fuselage, with gold cheatline in the middle, and the well-known globe logo. This livery is similar to Continental Airlines' 1991 livery, except the "globe" icon is of a different design (1999–2012)
- Copa Airlines (1st upgrade) - Same as the original, but "Copa Airlines" is now in sans serif typeface, similar to the font used by United Airlines (2012–present)

== Services ==
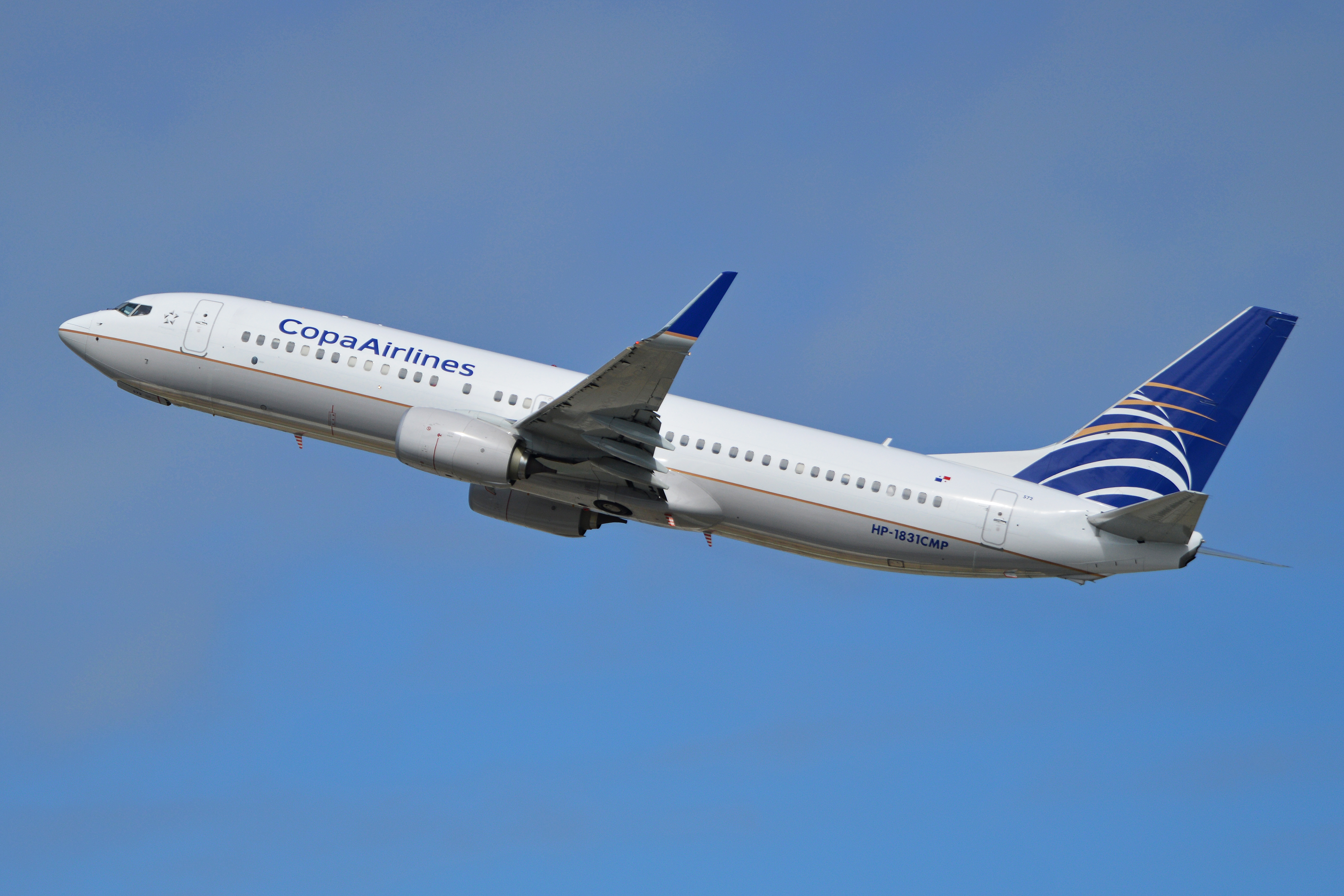
Copa Airlines Boeing 737-800 (2014)

=== Business Class ===
Business seats are available on all aircraft. Business Class passengers check in at separate counters and are given priority with boarding and baggage handling, access to the Copa/United Club and other airline lounges, and bonus miles for the Copa ConnectMiles program. In-flight service includes pre-departure beverages, multi-course meals, and pillows and blankets (depending on the type and duration of the flight) on all international flights. Business Class also either equipped with reclinable leather seats with footrests and adjustable headrest or a lie-flat bed product on their 737 MAX fleet which also includes a 120V power outlet, a large tray table, a USB port, and personal Audio-Video-on-Demand (AVOD) screen.

=== Economy Class ===
Economy seats are available on all aircraft. Economy seats on new Boeing 737-800s feature an adjustable headrest and a personal AVOD with a 5-inch (13 cm) touch screen, while older 737-800s provide entertainment on flip down screens above the seats. All Boeing 737 are also equipped with a radio antenna, which allows passengers to listen a wide list of songs and instrumentals from twelve channels. Food and snacks are available on domestic, short, and some medium-haul international flights. Full meals are complimentary on all other medium and long-haul international flights. Alcoholic drinks are complimentary for economy passengers on all flights.

Additionally, the main cabin has 24 Economy Extra seats, with more space, more entertainment options, and more comfort. Also, the Main Cabin has USB ports at each seat and larger overhead bins.

=== ConnectMiles ===
ConnectMiles is Copa Airlines' frequent flyer program, offering frequent travelers the ability to purchase tickets with miles. Customers accrue miles from flight segments flown on Copa Airlines, United Airlines, and other Star Alliance member airlines. Benefits of Premier status include priority check-in, priority boarding, complimentary upgrades, and discounted airport lounge memberships (United Club/Copa Club). Due to the Continental-United merger, Copa Airlines phased out the OnePass frequent flyer program on December 31, 2011, and adopted the MileagePlus program on March 3, 2012.

In March 2015, Copa Airlines announced that it would phase out the MileagePlus program in favor of a new frequent flyer program called ConnectMiles. The new program was fully implemented on July 1, 2015.

=== Copa Club ===
Copa Club is the membership airport lounge program of Copa Airlines jointly operated with United Airlines. The flagship Copa Club lounge is located in its hub at Tocumen International Airport in Panama City. The lounges offer amenities for travelers and members also have access to affiliated lounges around the world. The Copa Club locations in Central America and the Caribbean includes:

- Augusto César Sandino International Airport (Nicaragua)
- Juan Santamaria International Airport (Costa Rica)
- Las Américas International Airport (Santo Domingo)
- La Aurora International Airport (Guatemala)
- El Dorado International Airport (Bogotá)
- Jose Maria Cordova International Airport (Medellin)
- Tocumen International Airport (Panama)

== Incidents and accidents ==
During its history, Copa Airlines had the following notable incidents and accidents:

Copa Airlines reported incidents
Flight	Date	Aircraft	Location	Description	Casualties				
Flight	Date	Aircraft	Location	Description	Fatal	Serious	Minor	Uninjured	Ground
201	June 6, 1992	Boeing 737-200	near Tucutí, Darien	Flight 201, a leased Boeing 737-200 Advanced (registered HP-1205CMP), flipped and crashed in the Darién Gap during a flight from Panama City to Cali after an instrument failure, killing all 40 passengers and 7 crew members on board. This is the only fatal accident in Copa Airlines history to date.	47	0	0	0	0
301	November 19, 1993	Boeing 737-100	Tocumen International Airport	The plane (registered HP-873CMP) was damaged beyond repair when it veered off the runway upon landing at Tocumen International Airport at 19:19 local time following a flight from Miami, Florida, with 86 passengers and six crew members. The pilots could not properly align the aircraft with the runway because of severe crosswinds, which led to the nose gear being torn off. There were no reported injuries.	0	0	0	92	0
317	August 7, 1994	Boeing 737	Augusto C. Sandino International Airport, Managua, Nicaragua	A hijacker, a former Farabundo Martí National Liberation Front guerrilla, demanded diversion to Mexico to seek asylum. The pilot landed in Managua where the hijacker released all hostages and was arrested, after the pilot first convinced the hijacker that there was not enough fuel to reach Mexico. The flight was en route from Panama City to Guatemala City via Managua.	0	0	0	78+ (Note: 78 passengers confirmed released; crew count not recorded in available sources.)	0
