= Air Services Cargo =

Cargo airline based in Panama, 2002–2003

- Commenced operations: 2002
- Ceased operations: 2003
- Operating bases: Albrook "Marcos A. Gelabert" International Airport
- Headquarters: Panama City, Panama

Air Services Cargo was a short-lived cargo airline based in Panama City, Panama. The airline was operational between 2002 and 2003, operating cargo flights within the Americas from Albrook "Marcos A. Gelabert" International Airport, Panama City.
