= Copa Holdings =

Panamanian airline holding company

Copa Holdings S.A.
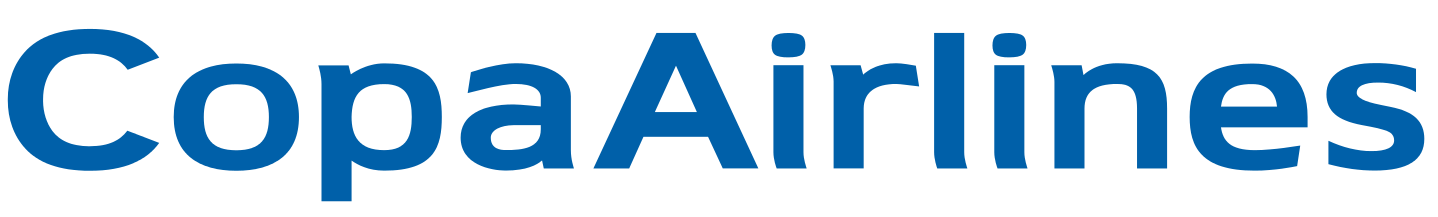
- Company type: Public
- Traded as: NYSE: CPA
- Industry: Transportation
- Founded: 6 May 1988; 38 years ago
- Headquarters: Panama City, Panama
- Key people: Pedro Heilbron (CEO); Stanley Motta (Chair)
- Revenue: ▲US$2.97 billion (2022)
- Operating income: ▲US$0.45 billion (2022)
- Net income: ▲US$0.35 billion (2022)
- Total assets: ▲US$4.69 billion (2022)
- Total equity: ▲US$1.49 billion (2022)
- Owner: CIASA (27.8%)
- Number of employees: 7,265 (2022)
- Subsidiaries: Copa Airlines; Copa Airlines Colombia; Wingo
- Footnotes / references Financials as of December 31, 2022. References

Copa Holdings, S.A. is a publicly traded Panamanian airline holding company based in Panama City that owns two airlines: Panama-based Copa Airlines and Colombia-based AeroRepública (operating as Copa Airlines Colombia and Wingo). The company is a major provider of passenger and cargo air services in Latin America, operating out of its base at Tocumen International Airport, which is located near the border between North and South America, which the company sees as a strategically important location.

== History ==
In 1947, Panamanian investors joined forces with Pan American World Airways (Pan Am) to launch Compañía Panameña de Aviación (Spanish for 'Panamanian Aviation Company'), soon known simply as Copa. Initially, Copa served domestic routes in Panama with just three Douglas C-47 aircraft. The 1960s marked Copa's entry into the international arena, offering flights to Costa Rica, Jamaica, and Colombia. Pan Am divested its stake in Copa in 1971, leaving the airline under Panamanian control.

The 1980s saw a strategic shift for Copa as they discontinued domestic flights to focus solely on international travel. In 1986, ownership transitioned to Corporación de Inversiones Aéreas, S.A (Spanish for 'Air Investment Corporation') or CIASA.

A defining moment arrived in 1998 with a significant investment by Continental Airlines. This led to the formation of Copa Holdings, a holding company for Copa Airlines, with CIASA retaining a majority stake (51%). Continental's investment also included a strategic alliance, fostering code-sharing, marketing initiatives, and technical collaboration. Since then, Copa's fleet has grown significantly, boasting 97 aircraft as of 2023.

Copa Holdings went public on the New York Stock Exchange in 2005. Continental gradually reduced its ownership, eventually exiting entirely by 2008. CIASA also decreased its holdings, though it remains a significant shareholder (27.8% as of 2022).

Expansion continued in 2005 with Copa Holdings acquiring a controlling interest (later reaching 99.9%) in AeroRepública, the second largest carrier in Colombia in terms of passengers carried, and rebranded it as Copa Airlines Colombia. This move was further bolstered by AeroRepública launching Wingo, a low-cost airline brand established in December 2016 to diversify its offerings and better compete with other carriers from Colombia.

== See also ==
- List of airline holding companies § North America
