= Panavia (Panama) =

IATA	ICAO	Call sign
6Z	PVI	—
- Founded: 1994
- Ceased operations: 2006
- Hubs: Tocumen International Airport
- Fleet size: 2 (upon closure)
- Headquarters: Panama City, Panama
- Website: http://www.panaviacargo.com/ (defunct)

Panavia was an airline based in Panama City, Panama. Established in 1994, it operated chartered cargo flights out of Tocumen International Airport, Panama City. In 2006, Panavia was shut down.

== Destinations ==
In 2005, Panavia operated scheduled flights to Bogotá, Mexico City and San José.

== Fleet ==
At closure, the Panavia fleet consisted of the following aircraft:

- 1 Boeing 727-100F
- 1 Boeing 727-200F
