= British Caledonian =

Private airline of the United Kingdom (1970–1988)

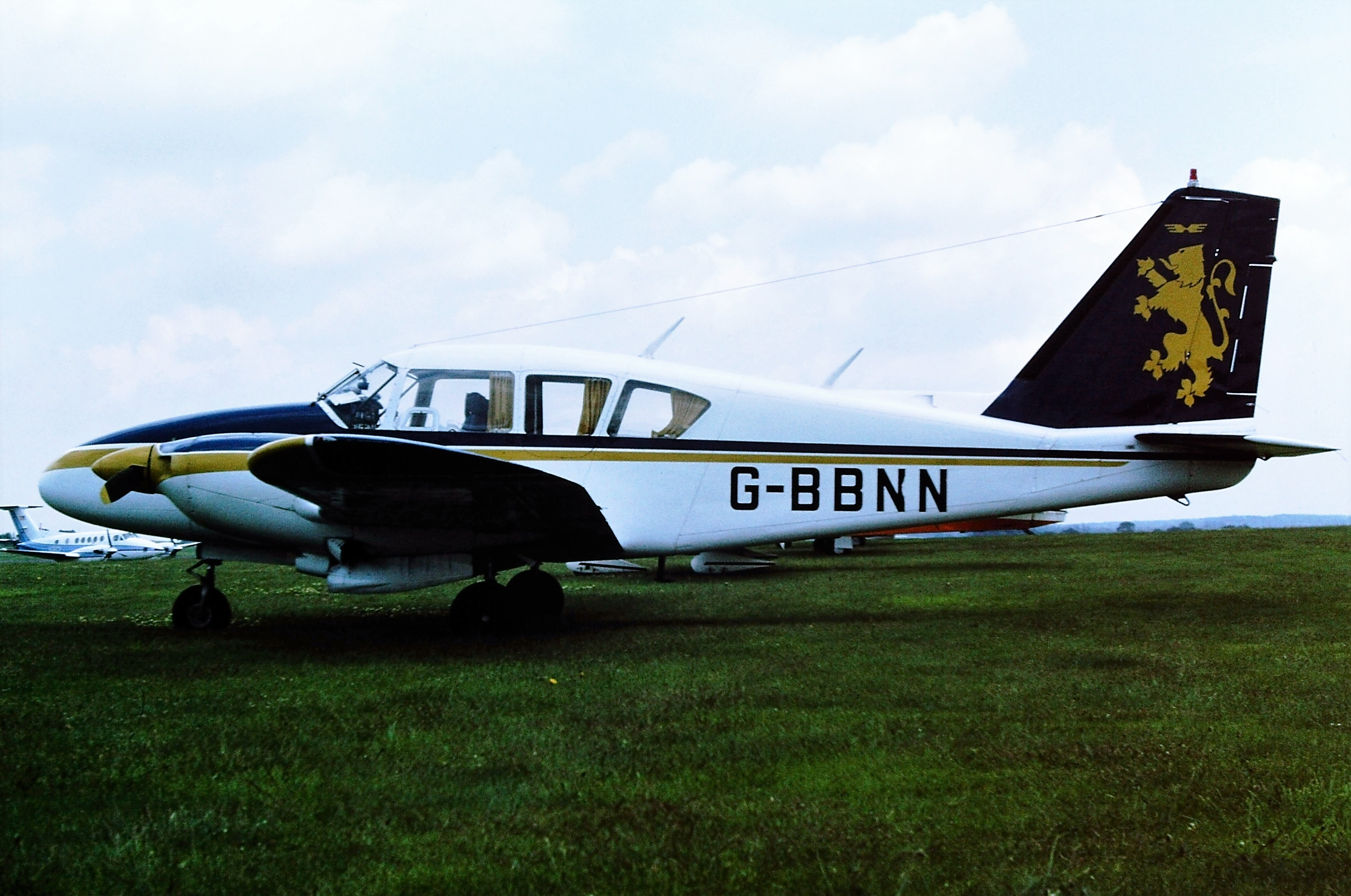
- A BCal Aztec
IATA	ICAO	Call sign
BR	BCC	CALEDONIAN
- Founded: 30 November 1970 (amalgamation)
- Ceased operations: 14 April 1988 (merged into British Airways)
- Hubs: Gatwick Airport
- Subsidiaries: British Caledonian Aircraft Trading (1974–1987); British Caledonian Airways Charter (1982–1985); British Caledonian Flight Training (1985–1987); British Caledonian Helicopters (1979–1987); British Caledonian Travel Holdings (1982–1985); Cal Air International (50%) (1985–1987); Caledonian Airmotive (1981–1986); Caledonian Airways (Charter) (1970–1982); Caledonian Airways (Leasing) (1970–1974); Caledonian Equipment Holdings (1970–1974); Caledonian Far East Airways (1985–1987); Caledonian Hotel Holdings (1985–1986); Caledonian Hotel Management (1970–1984); Caledonian Leisure Holdings (1985–1986)
- Parent company: Caledonian Airways Ltd (1970–1981); Caledonian Aviation Group plc (1982–1985); British Caledonian Group plc (1986–1987)
- Headquarters: Gatwick Airport (1970–1980); Caledonian House, Lowfield Heath, Crawley, West Sussex, England (1981–1987)
- Key people: Sir Adam Thomson; John de la Haye

British Caledonian (BCal) was a private independent airline in the United Kingdom that operated from 1970 until it merged with British Airways in 1988. It operated primarily from London Gatwick Airport in south-east England. BCal was formed by the merger of Caledonian Airways (then the UK's second-largest, independent charter airline) and British United Airways (BUA) the largest British independent airline and the UK's leading independent scheduled carrier. It was created as an alternative to the British government-controlled corporation airlines and was described as the "Second Force" in the 1969 Edwards report. The carrier slogan was "Let's go British Caledonian" in the 1970s and "We never forget you have a choice" in the 1980s. The BUA takeover enabled Caledonian to realise its long-held ambition to transform itself into a scheduled airline. The merged entity eventually became the UK's foremost independent, international scheduled airline.

A series of major financial setbacks during the mid-1980s combined with the airline's inability to grow sufficiently to reach a viable size put it at serious risk of collapse. British Caledonian began looking for a merger partner to improve its competitive position. In December 1987, British Airways (BA) bought the airline. The Caledonian name was used to rebrand BA's Gatwick-based subsidiary British Airtours as Caledonian Airways.

== History ==
=== Inception ===
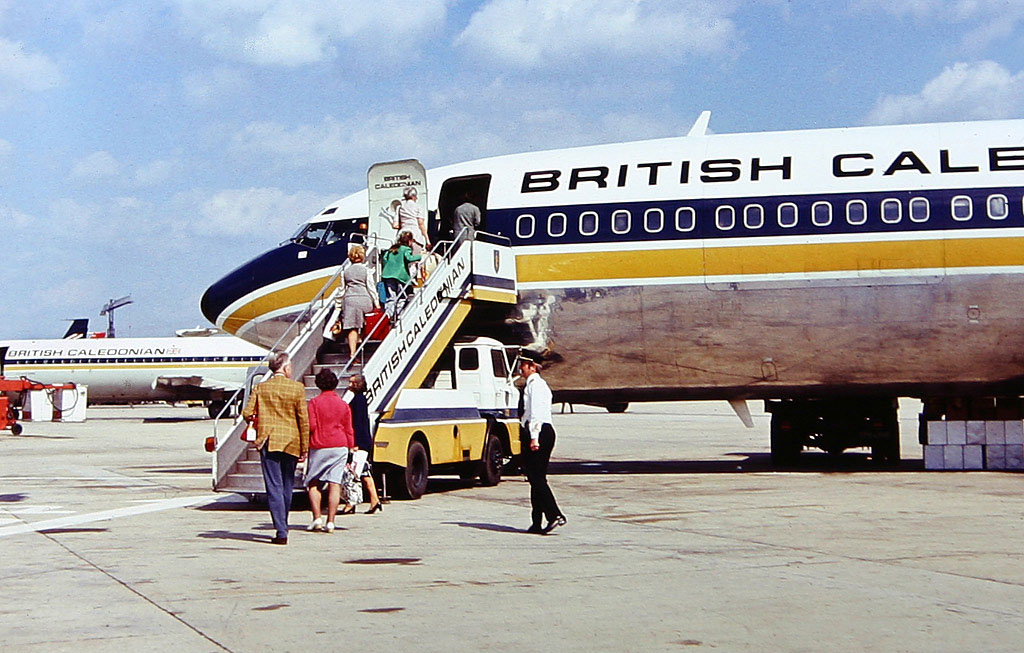
British Caledonian Boeing 707-320C at Gatwick Airport in 1975

Caledonian Airways acquired British United Airways (BUA) from British and Commonwealth (B&C) on 30 November (St. Andrew's Day) 1970, for £6.9 million. Three new BAC One-Eleven 500 aircraft, which B&C had leased to BUA, were bought £5 million. The acquisition did not include the assets of British United Island Airways (BUIA), BUA's regional affiliate. BCal inherited BUA's minority stakes in Gambia Airways, Sierra Leone Airways and Uganda Aviation Services.. BCal was a full member of the International Air Transport Association (IATA) from the start by inheriting BUA's membership. This included membership of IATA's trade association as well as participation in tariff co-ordination with other member airlines in the organisation's annual traffic conferences.

BCal was a wholly owned subsidiary of Caledonian Airways Ltd. (Note: the new name of Airways Interests (Thomson)) BCal itself had a number of subsidiaries including Caledonian Airways Equipment Holdings and Caledonian Airways (Leasing), which were set up to acquire and dispose of aircraft on behalf of the airline as well as to sell maintenance, training and management expertise to third parties. BCal owned two package holiday companies (Blue Sky Holidays and Golden Lion Tours) as well as several hotels in Spain and Sierra Leone.

The airline's formation followed publication of the Edwards report entitled British Air Transport in the Seventies in 1969. and a subsequent White paper from the government The report recommended the creation of a "Second Force", private sector carrier to take on the state-owned corporations — British European Airways (BEA) and British Overseas Airways Corporation (BOAC) — by providing competing domestic and international scheduled services on trunk routes. The government rejected the proposed transfer of routes from BOAC and BEA to the Second Force, and held that dual designation on a route should be open to any British independent. The new airline established its headquarters and operational base at Gatwick Airport and Sir Adam Thomson, one of the five co-founders as well as one of the main shareholders of Caledonian Airways, became its chairman and managing director.

BCal also had its own air freight terminal at Heathrow operating two weekly all-cargo flights from there until the early 1980s.

BCal began with a fleet of 31 jet aircraft: 11 long-haul aircraft (seven ex-Caledonian Boeing 707s and four ex-BUA Vickers VC10) and 20 short-haul planes (eight ex-BUA and four ex-Caledonian BAC One-Eleven 500s and eight ex-BUA BAC One-Eleven 200s). The issued share capital was £12 million — more than that of any other wholly private, British independent airline at the time — and its workforce numbered 4,400. (Note: including 450 flightdeck and 800 cabin crew, 1,000 maintenance personnel and 700 ramp workers)

This made BCal the UK's foremost independent airline of the time. Although Dan-Air and Britannia Airways exceeded BCal's total annual passenger numbers from 1975, BCal maintained its position as Britain's leading independent international scheduled airline, in terms of both the number of scheduled passengers carried each year and the total yearly scheduled capacity measured in passenger kilometres, (Note: the distance covered by its scheduled operation multiplied by the number of scheduled passengers carried within a 12-month period) throughout its 17-year existence.) The newly created company's output measured in available capacity tonne kilometres (Note: a figure arrived at by multiplying the number of [metric] tonnes available for the carriage of revenue load (passengers, cargo and mail) on each flight sector by the sector's distance in kilometres) was greater than that of some of the smaller, contemporary European flag carriers, such as Aer Lingus, Air India, Sabena, or Swissair. By that measure, BCal was about the same size as Australia's flag carrier Qantas.

The institutional investors that had helped Sir Adam Thomson and John de la Haye launch Caledonian Airways back in 1961 were also among the shareholders of the newly constituted airline. They included The Automobile Association (AA), Great Universal Stores (GUS), Hogarth Shipping, Lyle Shipping, Industrial and Commercial Finance Corporation (ICFC) — one of the two predecessors of Investors in Industry, (Note: 3i's former name) Kleinwort Benson, the Royal Bank of Scotland (RBS) and Schroders. (Airways Interests (Thomson), which had been set up at Caledonian's inception a decade earlier as an investment vehicle for that airline's founders to enable them to maintain control, was renamed Caledonian Airways Ltd and became the new group holding company.)

Before adopting the British Caledonian name, the new airline legally constituted two separate entities — Caledonian Airways (Prestwick) Ltd and British United Airways Ltd. These traded together under the interim name Caledonian//BUA until September 1971. The combined airline carried a total of 2.6 million passengers during its first year of operation.

For accounting purposes, BCal's aircraft were respectively allocated to a "BUA Division" and "Caledonian Division" during the interim period. The former was responsible for all IATA activities. This encompassed all scheduled services. The latter was responsible for all non-IATA work. This included all non-scheduled operations. At that time, two-thirds of all passengers were carried on charter flights. (Note: accounting for 60% of revenues)

During that period, former BUA air hostesses still wearing that airline's blue uniforms were working alongside their tartan-clad, former Caledonian counterparts in the cabins of all passenger flights. Eventually, the Caledonian tartan uniforms became BCal's standard for female staff.

Following the interim period, Caledonian Airways (Prestwick) Ltd and British United Airways Ltd were merged into British Caledonian Airways Ltd (BCal). All former BUA aircraft were repainted adopting Caledonian's livery featuring a prominent Scottish Lion Rampant on its aircraft's fins. At that time, all aircraft were named after famous Scots and well-known Scottish places. This tradition was continued throughout the airline's 17-year existence. Some BCal aircraft were also allocated out-of-sequence registrations. (For instance, G-BCAL was allocated to one of the Boeing 707s, G-CLAN and G-SCOT were the registrations of the Piper Navajo Chieftains, G-DCIO was the registration of the eighth DC-10 and G-HUGE was the Boeing 747 Combi registration)

The "Second Force" inherited BUA's extensive network of scheduled routes serving the British Isles, Continental Europe, Africa and South America. Its scheduled ambitions were aided by the British Government transferring to it BOAC's West African trunk routes to Nigeria and Ghana as well as the corporation's North African route to Libya. These routes represented only 3% of BOAC's annual, worldwide turnover.

The Government also agreed to let it serve Casablanca in Morocco from Gatwick in competition with BEA's service from Heathrow. Furthermore, the Government agreed to license BCal to operate non-stop scheduled services between London and Paris and to begin negotiations with the French authorities to secure reciprocal approval for BCal to be able to commence scheduled operations on what was then the busiest international air route in Europe. BCal moreover received Government assurances that it would be designated as the UK's sole flag carrier on all routes transferred to it and that it would be assisted in obtaining traffic rights for additional, selected scheduled routes where it wished to compete with the corporations, including the lucrative London—New York and London—Los Angeles routes.

Another important concession by the Government designed to improve the competitiveness of the "Second Force" was to permit it to provide a first class cabin on its East African routes. (BUA, from whom BCal inherited these routes, had been prevented from offering a first class on its East African routes. To compensate for this loss of competitiveness, Sir Freddie Laker, BUA's managing director from 1960 to 1965, had come up with the idea of designing a cargo door to be installed on the left-hand side of the forward fuselage of that airline's long-haul VC10s, where the first class cabin was normally located. This modification permitted the carriage of additional freight instead of first class passengers on the East African routes.)

In addition, BCal became the Government's "chosen instrument of the private sector". This meant that the Government agreed to accord preferential status to BCal's worldwide scheduled ambitions, especially in the award of additional licences to operate scheduled services on major domestic and international trunk routes. The Government hoped that putting BCal's requirements ahead of other UK-based independent airlines' rival scheduled ambitions would help the new "Second Force" develop into a fully fledged, major international scheduled airline, thereby enabling it to achieve the critical mass to challenge the corporations' near-monopoly among UK-based scheduled airlines.

The Central London air terminal at Victoria Station in London's West End, which the "Second Force" inherited from BUA as well, allowed passengers to complete all check-in formalities, including dropping off their hold luggage, before boarding their train to the airport.

BCal also had a Gatwick airside lounge for its premium passengers, which it named Clansmen Lounge.

=== Formative years ===
BCal commenced scheduled operations from Gatwick to Nigeria (Lagos and Kano) and Ghana (Accra) in April 1971. Scheduled services from Gatwick to Tripoli began in July 1971. On each of these routes BCal replaced BOAC as the designated UK flag carrier. On 1 November 1971, BCal started scheduled flights between London Gatwick and Paris Le Bourget Airport, where it replaced BEA's London Heathrow—Paris Le Bourget service and competed with that airline's Heathrow—Paris Orly Airport service. This was the first time since the 1930s that an independent airline commenced a scheduled service on that trunk route.

BCal ended its 1970/71 financial year to 30 September 1971 with a profit of £1.7 million (after accounting for BUA's £600,000 loss)

In 1972, BCal extended its East African network to the Seychelles. The same year it also introduced a new Edinburgh—Newcastle—Copenhagen regional scheduled service to live up to its claim of being "Scotland's international airline". This complemented the Glasgow—Newcastle—Amsterdam regional route BCal had inherited from BUA.

1972 was also the year BCal introduced the UK's first-ever "no frills" type service on the two main domestic trunk routes linking London and Scotland. The airline introduced simultaneous night-time departures from Gatwick, Glasgow and Edinburgh, resulting in an overall frequency increase to six daily round-trips on each route. The company charged a very low £5 one-way fare on these night-time services, which were marketed under the Moonjet trademark. This move, which was modelled on the high-frequency-low-fares operation run by Pacific Southwest Airlines (PSA), the original "no frills" airline, along the busy San Diego—Los Angeles—San Francisco air corridor in California, boosted passenger numbers and profitability on both routes.

During that year, larger capacity, longer range and more fuel-efficient Boeing 707s replaced VC10s on BCal's South American routes, where the 707's greater range enabled the airline to run non-stop flights between London Gatwick and Rio de Janeiro, as well as on the West African trunk routes to Nigeria and Ghana.

As a result of the then prevailing, ruinous rates in the charter market, which still accounted for half of BCal's business, the airline incurred a loss of £194,000 during the financial year to 30 September 1972.

To support its ambitious expansion plans, BCal acquired a number of additional, second-hand Boeing 707s from various sources through its aircraft trading and leasing subsidiaries during the early 1970s. These included a pair of 320C series aircraft procured on a long-term lease from Britannia Airways featuring a two-class, "widebody look" interior. Another three 707s received re-modelled "widebody" cabins. All five were used to inaugurate the airline's transatlantic scheduled routes to New York and Los Angeles where the established competition was operating widebodied aircraft, such as the Boeing 747 "jumbo jet". It was thought that the aircraft's widebody style interiors would leave passengers with the impression that BCal was operating widebodied aircraft when in fact it was not. During that time, BCal placed an order with the British Aircraft Corporation (BAC) for two new One-Eleven 500s and acquired additional second-hand examples. At the same time, the airline disposed of some of its 707s, VC10s and One-Eleven 200s. These included the original pair of 399C series 707 aircraft that had been delivered to Caledonian Airways direct from the manufacturer in 1967/68.

BCal inaugurated its two transatlantic flagship services from London Gatwick to John F. Kennedy Airport (JFK) on 1 April 1973, followed by Gatwick — Los Angeles International a few days later. Earl Mountbatten of Burma was BCal's chief guest on board its inaugural Gatwick—JFK flight. (The flight diverted to Boston due to inclement weather in the New York area.) This occasion marked the first time that a British independent airline commenced non-stop transatlantic scheduled services on routes linking the UK and the US. Also on 1 April 1973, BCal replaced the two-letter CA airline designator – which was originally used to prefix all Caledonian Airways flight numbers and continued to prefix flight numbers allocated to transatlantic charter flights until 31 March 1973 – with the BR airline designator it had inherited from BUA at the time of its formation. This resulted in exclusive use of the BR designator as a prefix for all BCal flight numbers.

In 1973, BCal also inaugurated its fourth scheduled domestic trunk route between London Gatwick and Manchester. The new service was contracted to British Island Airways (BIA), BUIA's successor, which operated two daily return trips using its Handley Page Dart Herald turboprops.

On 20 March 1974, BCal switched its Gatwick—Paris services to the then brand-new Charles de Gaulle Airport in the northern Paris suburb of Roissy-en-France, thus becoming the first scheduled carrier to operate between London and the new Paris airport.

To further extend the network's reach and improve its connectivity, BCal agreed to host Dan-Air's new, twice daily Gatwick—Newcastle flights, which began on 20 April 1974, in its computer reservation system (CRS) as part of a combined marketing effort.

June 1974 saw the launch of BCal's non-stop Gatwick—Brussels scheduled route, the third European trunk route (Note: in addition to Gatwick—Amsterdam (inherited from BUA) and Gatwick—Paris) on which the airline operated scheduled services in competition with the incumbent flag carriers' established services from Heathrow.

=== 1974 crisis year ===
The creation of British Airways (BA) as a result of the 1974 BEA-BOAC merger came against the background of the first global oil crisis in the wake of the 1973 Arab-Israeli War, which led to the quadrupling of the price of a barrel of oil as a consequence of the decision by the Organization of Petroleum Exporting Countries (OPEC) to boycott the West in retaliation for its support of Israel during that war. This meant that the newly merged corporation's original revenue and profit projections were far too optimistic. During that time, BA began exerting pressure on the Government, at the time its sole owner as well as the regulator for all UK airlines, to curtail the activities of its independent competitors generally and of the "Second Force" in particular.

The difficult operating environment at the time did not affect BA alone. In fact, the major scheduled airlines were all losing enormous amounts of money at the time. The sudden spike in the oil price caused a major recession during the second half of 1974 as well as the first half of 1975, with much reduced demand for air travel. This in turn led to the collapse of a number of prominent travel companies and their associated airlines — most notably the Court Line group and Horizon Holidays, the latter having provided work for three BCal short-haul aircraft prior to its collapse. There was also massive overcapacity on the North Atlantic routes.

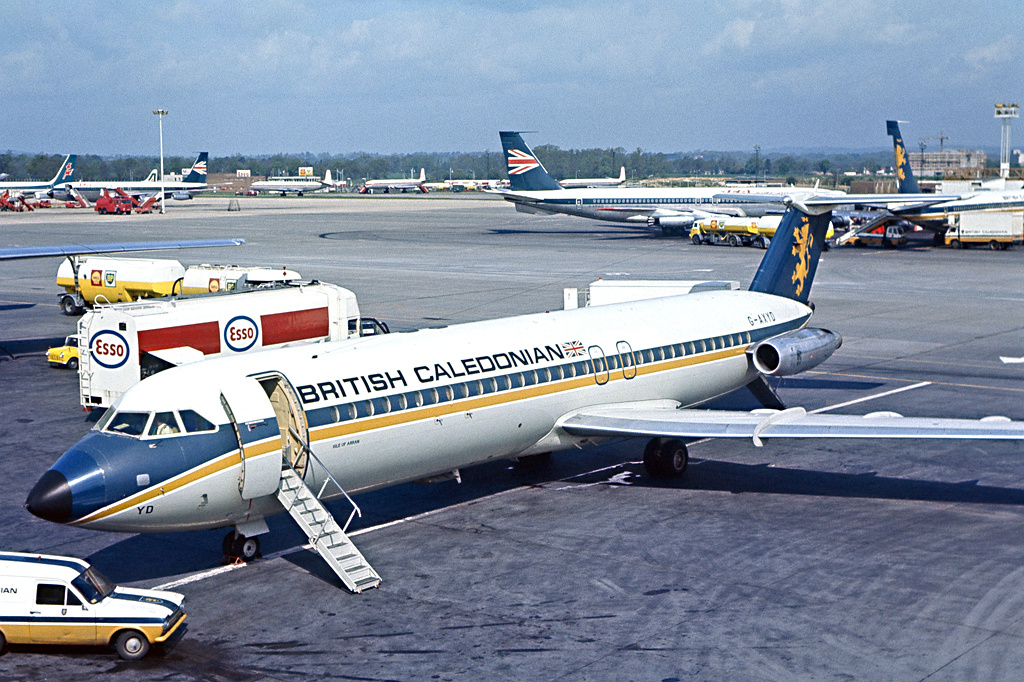
British Caledonian BAC 111-509EW at Gatwick

These circumstances forced BCal to put in place a major programme of retrenchment, known internally as Plan "S" (from "survival") Plan "S" began to be implemented from 1 November 1974. It resulted in route cut-backs — including the suspension of the transatlantic "flagship" services, of which Flight International said the fuel crisis was a "heaven-sent excuse" to back out of a failure. the immediate withdrawal and subsequent disposal of the remaining VC10 long-haul aircraft, the grounding of a number of short-haul aircraft as well 827 redundancies out of the company's 5,673 staff. It also resulted in organisational changes that saw Adam Thomson become the airline's chief executive in addition to continuing in his role as chairman of a reconstituted board, and the transfer of all aircraft leasing, purchase and sale activities to a new subsidiary. British Caledonian Aircraft Trading was the name of the company that succeeded Caledonian Airways Equipment Holdings, Caledonian Airways (Leasing) and other related interests. It became one of the most profitable parts of the business.

In addition to withdrawing from the prestigious long-haul routes to New York and Los Angeles after only 18 months, other specific measures the airline took at the time to ensure its survival included dropping all scheduled flights to Belfast, Copenhagen, Gibraltar, Ibiza, Málaga, Palma de Mallorca and Tunis, indefinitely suspending scheduled services on the Glasgow—Southampton route as well as cutting the number of frequencies on the Gatwick—Glasgow and Gatwick—Edinburgh routes from six to four daily round trips. Two surplus aircraft were leased out to Air Malta and Austrian Airlines respectively for the duration of the 1975 summer timetable period. Another aircraft was stationed at West Berlin's Tegel Airport during the month of July of that year to fulfill a short-term charter contract to carry Turkish migrant workers to and from Istanbul on behalf of a local tour operator. BCal also decided to increase its 707 freighter fleet from one to four aircraft and to acquire a five-seater Piper Aztec to serve the rapidly growing executive charter market. These changes left BCal with 25 operational aircraft for the 1975 summer season. To reduce operating costs further, the airline decided to contract out its scheduled operations between Gatwick and Le Touquet to BIA. (Note: a similar arrangement was introduced between Gatwick and Rotterdam during the 1976–77 winter timetable period) The reason for replacing BCal's One-Eleven 200 jet aircraft on this route with that airline's Herald turboprops at the beginning of the 1975 summer timetable period was the high price of jet fuel, which had made BCal's own jet aircraft operations uneconomic.

Even during this period of severe retrenchment, BCal continued launching scheduled services to new destinations. Dakar joined the airline's network on 1 November 1974, followed by Kinshasa on 1 April 1975.

As a result of the "success" of Plan "S", BCal's fortunes quickly recovered. The airline operation itself made a small profit of £250,000 during the financial year ended 30 September 1975 (Note: BCal's operating profit for the 1974/75 financial reporting period translated into an overall loss of £366,000, after taking into account the heavy costs relating to the early disposal of the remaining VC10s and the grounding of several other aircraft as well as the voluntary redundancy programme to achieve the required reduction in headcount) after having lost £4.3 million the year before.

=== Spheres of influence ===
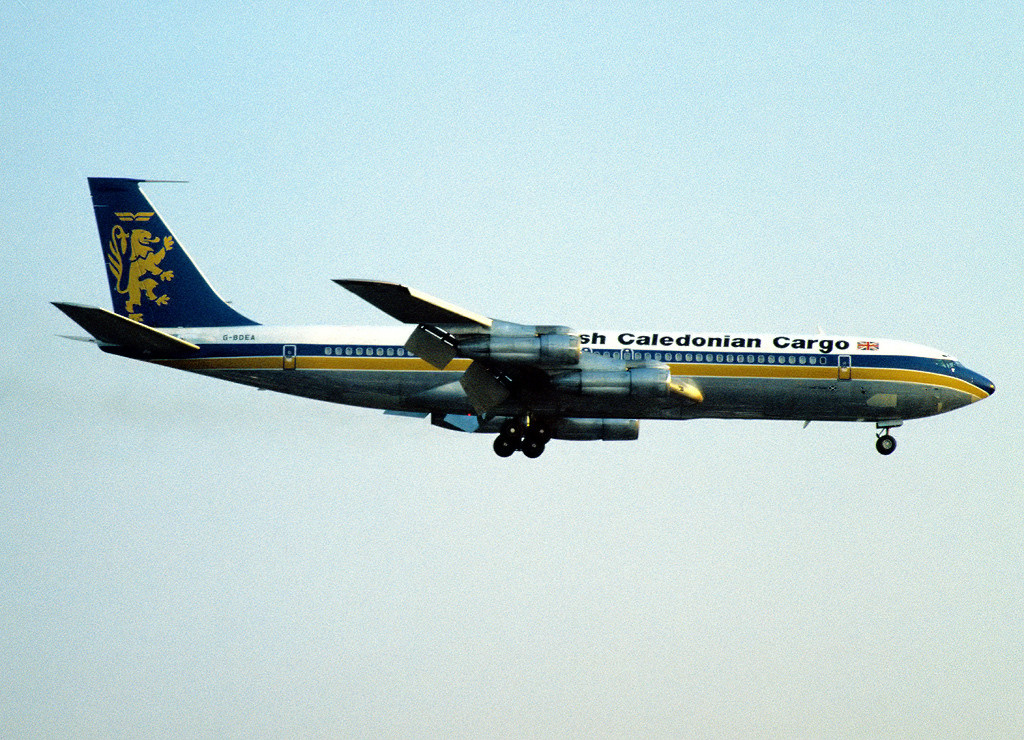
British Caledonian Airways Cargo Boeing 707

The then Trade Secretary Peter Shore conducted a review of the Government's aviation policy and in 1976 announced a new "spheres of influence" policy that ended dual designation for British airlines on all long-haul routes. It was no longer believed that competition was increasing the UK market share of the traffic. As a result, BA and BCal were no longer permitted to run competing scheduled services on long-haul routes, and BCal had to withdraw from the East African routes inherited from BUA as well as from the London—New York and London—Los Angeles routes. BCal lost its licences to New York, Los Angeles, Boston and Toronto – routes it had stopped running in 1974. It gained Lusaka (Zambia) In return, BCal became the sole British flag carrier to the entire South American mainland by taking over the former BA routes to Colombia, Peru and Venezuela. The net losses of revenues was about equal for the two airlines.

The Government's new "spheres of influence" aviation policy confined BCal's long-haul scheduled operations to two continents — Africa and South America. The loss of BCal's East African routes enabled the airline to replace the one-stop scheduled service via Nairobi to Lusaka with non-stop flights.

During 1976, BCal's recovery continued, leading to the introduction of a new scheduled route to Algiers and the reinstatement of scheduled services to Tunis. It also led to BCal's decision to replace the two daily Gatwick—Manchester round-trips BIA had operated with turboprops with a BCal One-Eleven service from the start of the 1976–77 winter timetable period. This equipment change was accompanied by the addition of a third daily frequency. (Note: the new mid-day service was initially operated by BIA Heralds under contract to BCal; BCal took over the operation of this service on 1 January 1977, giving a three-times-daily One-Eleven schedule)

BCal ended its 1975/76 financial year with a healthy profit of £5.6 million.

=== Bermuda II treaty ===
In July 1976, Edmund Dell, the then new Secretary of State for Trade, renounced the original Bermuda air services agreement of 1946 and initiated bilateral negotiations with his US counterparts on a new air services agreement, which resulted in the Bermuda II Agreement of 1977. This presented BCal with new transatlantic opportunities to begin scheduled services to additional gateway cities in the US.

Under the new agreement, BCal had its licences to commence scheduled services from its Gatwick base to both Houston and Atlanta confirmed and was designated as the UK's exclusive flag carrier on both routes. It also obtained a licence and sole UK flag carrier status to commence scheduled services from Gatwick to Dallas–Fort Worth. In addition, BCal obtained a licence and sole UK flag carrier status to commence scheduled all cargo flights between Gatwick and Houston — including an optional stop at Manchester or Prestwick in either direction.

During the Bermuda II negotiations, the UK side succeeded in having inserted into the new air services agreement a clause stating that Gatwick — rather than Heathrow — was to be nominated as the designated US flag carrier's London gateway airport whenever BCal was going to be the sole designated UK flag carrier on the same route. This clause was meant to support the growth of BCal's scheduled operation at Gatwick as well as to redress the competitive imbalance between it and its much bigger, more powerful rivals.

The UK side furthermore succeeded in negotiating a three-year exclusivity period for the incumbent operator on any new route with their US counterparts.

For Gatwick-based BCal this meant that it did not have to face any competitor that was using Heathrow, a more accessible airport with a bigger catchment area and a far greater number of passengers connecting between flights, on any of the new routes it was planning to launch to the US. It also meant that it had any new route to the US completely to itself for the first three years of operation, which most airline industry analysts reckon is sufficiently long for a brand-new scheduled air service to become profitable.

At British insistence, provisions in the Bermuda II agreement were included to prevent the much bigger, better financed and commercially more aggressive American carriers from undercutting BCal with predatory pricing offering loss-leading fares cross-subsidised by profits from their domestic networks generated, or by adding capacity far in excess of what the market could sustain ("capacity dumping"). Air fares were only approved if they reflected the actual cost of providing these services and capacity increases were sanctioned on a reciprocal basis only.

The agreement continued dual designation (two British flag carriers and two US flag carriers) on the London—New York and London—Los Angeles routes and dual designation was to be extended to another two high-volume routes.

BCal resumed scheduled transatlantic services on 24 October 1977. The airline was the first UK carrier to launch a daily, non-stop London (Gatwick)—Houston scheduled service as well as a weekly, direct all-cargo service on the same route, which operated via Prestwick on the outbound leg and via Manchester on the return leg. The passenger flights began with a Boeing 707-320C narrow-bodied aircraft. In April 1978, BCal re-configured the 707s on this route as a three-class layout: a dedicated Executive cabin, first class, and an economy class section. This was the first time in the jet age that a scheduled airline had offered a "third" class specifically aimed at the business traveller. It was intended to replace the 707s operating the all-passenger services with brand-new, larger capacity, more fuel-efficient DC-10 widebodied aircraft at the start of the 1978/79 winter timetable period.

=== Beginning of the widebody era ===
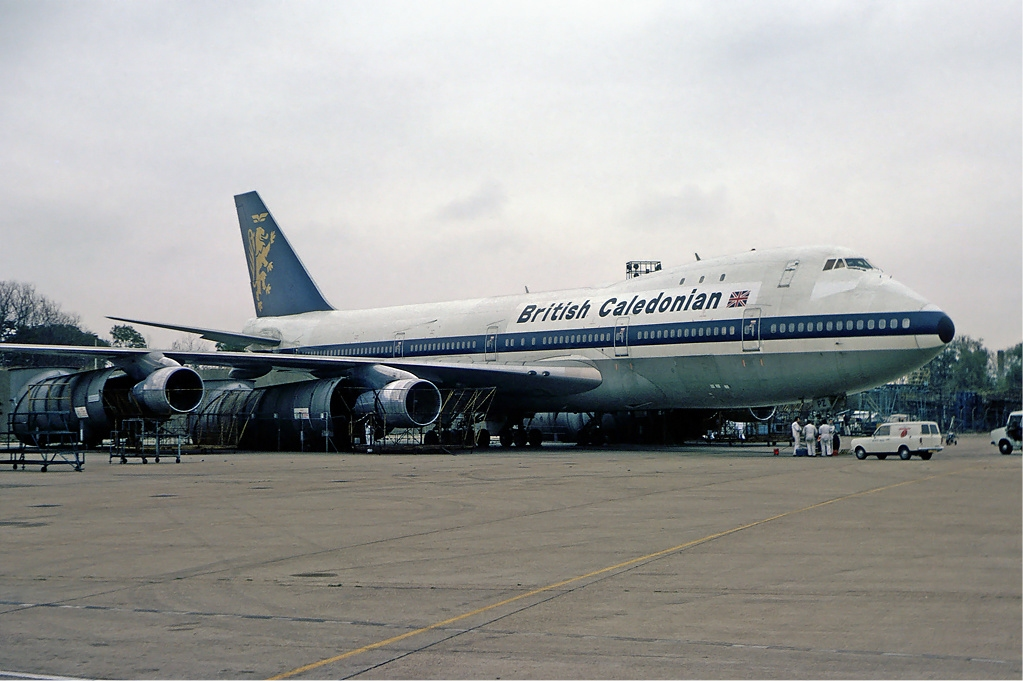
The first Boeing 747 to wear BCal colours being prepared for an engine run prior to delivery to BCal

After evaluating the Boeing 747, the McDonnell Douglas DC-10 and the Lockheed L-1011 Tristar during the early summer of 1976, BCal chose the DC-10 as the wide-bodied aircraft for its expanding long-haul route networ; the 747 was too large and the Tristar could not be delivered in time. On 3 June 1976, the airline placed a US$70 million order for two long-range series 30 aircraft with an option on another two. To ensure an early delivery, the company took over a delivery slot for two aircraft that had originally been booked by China Airlines. The first of the two DC-10s arrived at Gatwick on 13 March 1977., Configured in a 265-seat, two-class layout, it entered commercial service on West African trunk routes to Nigeria and Ghana later the same month, replacing the airline's Boeing 707s on six of the seven weekly services on these routes.

The second aircraft, which arrived at Gatwick in early May of that year, was initially configured in a 295-seat, single-class layout. It entered service later that month on BCal's Advance Booking Charter (ABC) routes to the US and Canada. The aircraft was re-configured in the airline's contemporary, 265-seat, two-class scheduled layout at the end of the summer period. It replaced Boeing 707s on two of BCal's three weekly South Atlantic schedules to Brazil, Argentina and Chile, and on one of the company's two weekly mid-Atlantic schedules to Venezuela, Colombia and Peru from the beginning of the 1977/78 winter timetable period.

The DC-10's superior operating economics compared with the 707 enabled BCal to operate the aircraft non-stop from Buenos Aires to Gatwick with a viable payload

Although the introduction of the DC-10 resulted in a huge increase in BCal's long-haul passenger and cargo capacity, the actual loads exceeded the airline's forecasts and helped it grow its traffic volumes on its scheduled services to West Africa and South America.

BCal was so pleased with the DC-10's performance that it decided to convert both of the options it had taken when placing the original order for two aircraft into firm orders for delivery in autumn 1978 and spring 1979 respectively. However, a strike at the manufacturer's plant meant that McDonnell Douglas could not honour its delivery schedules. For the Gatwick—Houston schedule during the 1978/79 winter timetable period BCal temporarily leased a Boeing 747-100 from Aer Lingus, with BA flightdeck crews to operate the aircraft.

=== Attaining success ===
By 1978, BCal had fully recovered from the 1974 crisis year, which had threatened its very existence at that time. After the severe contraction forced upon it by the early 1970s' oil crisis, the company's core scheduled operation was growing again with new widebodied aircraft and routes being added and schedules being expanded. Business was booming with planes being fuller than at any time in the firm's history. The airline recorded a pre-tax profit of £12.2 million during its 1977/78 financial year to 31 October 1978. This translated into a £10 million retained profit. It was the company's best financial result since its formation back in November 1970. BCal's senior management decided to allocate £644,000 of the retained profit to a new profit-share scheme to reward its staff for their hard work, and as an incentive for the future. BCal's profit-share scheme, which began the following year, was one of the first of its kind in the UK airline industry.

BCal ended charter flights in 1978, a decision taken the year before when charter flights had declined to just 15% of all passengers carried. Contraction of the transatlantic ABC flights market caused be Laker Airways Skytrain low-fares, "no frills" daily scheduled operation between London Gatwick and New York JFK, which had begun in the previous year's autumn season. and steady decline in charter rates in the European package tour holiday market where BCal used to supply whole-plane charter seats to its Blue Sky Holidays tour operator affiliate as well as third party tour companies.

1978 was also the first year BCal operated the majority of its scheduled services plying the prime long-haul routes to West Africa and South America with widebody equipment.

At the start of that year's summer timetable period, flight frequencies on BCal's Gatwick—Glasgow and Gatwick—Amsterdam routes increased to five round-trips per day on week days. During that period, the airline also resumed its Edinburgh—Newcastle—Copenhagen service, which it had abandoned in 1974.

During 1978, Abidjan and Birmingham joined BCal's scheduled route network. At the start of the 1978/79 winter timetable period, Benghazi joined the network. At that time, the airline also increased frequencies between London Gatwick and Paris Charles de Gaulle to seven daily round-trips on week days, with flights operating at two-hourly intervals. The addition of twice-weekly flights to the Libyan port city of Benghazi to the existing five weekly services to Tripoli meant that for the first time BCal was able to offer its passengers daily flights to Libya, an important market for profitable, oil-related business travel. BCal's introduction of a 747 on the daily Gatwick—Houston schedule furthermore enabled it to replace its two-class configured One-Eleven 500s on the West African coastal schedule to Banjul (The Gambia) and Freetown (Sierra Leone) via Casablanca and Las Palmas with 707s. The 707's greater range enabled it to cut out intermediate stops and offer its passengers a more convenient, direct routeing that took less time. BCal replaced two-class One-Elevens operating on the Tripoli route with 707s.

In early 1978, BCal introduced an updated livery.

1978 was furthermore the year Adam Thomson held the chairmanship of the Association of European Airlines (AEA). (Note: 1977 to 1978)

In addition, the British Airports Authority had just completed the first phase of a major refurbishment and extension of BCal's Gatwick base. The centrepiece of this revamp was a completely refurbished centre pier featuring 11 telescopic, widebody-compatible loading bridges. These were the first loading bridges to be installed at Gatwick, which was a single-terminal airport at the time. For the first time in its history, BCal also gained a dedicated check-in area for all its flights.

The year before, the Government had announced its intention to take pro-active steps to help ensure Gatwick's development as a genuine alternative to Heathrow. It was hoped that this in turn would assist BCal's development as a serious alternative to BA and the other major, established scheduled airlines. These steps included inviting BCal and Britain's other independent airlines to apply to the CAA for route licences to operate scheduled services to destinations in the British Isles and in Continental Europe that were not already served from Gatwick, thereby increasing the reach of the airport's scheduled route network as well as providing more connecting traffic for BCal.

BCal was keen to expand its limited short-haul European network beyond the existing four routes linking London Gatwick with Paris Charles de Gaulle, Amsterdam Schiphol, Brussels National and Genoa. The airline needed to develop its connecting traffic at Gatwick by growing the European network to include destinations in Germany, Switzerland, Scandinavia and southern Europe to help it increase load factors on its long-haul flights to Africa, South America and the US as well as to improve the profitability of these services. The airline had planned to commence new short-haul scheduled services from Gatwick to Copenhagen, Gothenburg, Oslo and Stockholm during summer 1978, using the licences the CAA had awarded it the year before. However, BCal was unable to use its newly awarded licences as there was no provision in the bilateral air services agreements the UK had concluded with Denmark, Norway and Sweden for another carrier to operate scheduled services on the main trunk routes between London and these countries. (Note: in addition to the incumbent flag carriers' services) This meant that BA and Scandinavian Airlines (SAS) had an effective monopoly on most routes between the UK and Scandinavia. The UK Government agreed to assist BCal in securing reciprocal traffic rights for the London—Scandinavia licences during its negotiations on a new bilateral air services agreement with its three Scandinavian counterparts in December 1978. It was hoped that this would enable BCal to commence its first-ever scheduled services from London to Scandinavia at the start of the 1979 summer timetable period.

Government initiatives in support of Gatwick's development also included new policies to transfer all scheduled services between London and Canada as well as London and the Iberian Peninsula from Heathrow to Gatwick by 1 April 1979, banning whole-plane charters at Heathrow and to compel all airlines that were planning to operate a scheduled service to or from London for the first time to use Gatwick instead of Heathrow. The latter policy was officially known as the "London [Air] Traffic Distribution Rules". It came into effect on 1 April 1978 and was applied retroactively from the beginning of April 1977. These rules were designed to achieve a fairer distribution of traffic between London Heathrow and London Gatwick, the UK's two main international gateway airports. The policy was aimed at increasing Gatwick's utilisation to help the airport make a profit.

Another pro-active measure the Government took to aid BCal's and Gatwick's development at the time was to grant permission for Airlink, a high-frequency helicopter shuttle service linking both of London's main airports. The new helicopter shuttle service linking London Heathrow and London Gatwick was inaugurated on 9 June 1978.

This service was operating 10 times a day in each direction (Note: from 07.10 hrs to 20.10 hrs) using a 28-seater Sikorsky S-61N helicopter, (Note: subsequent re-configuration reduced seating to 24 to increase space for interline passengers' transfer baggage) which was owned by the BAA. BCal held the licence to operate the service, provided the cabin crew (Note: a single crew member used to look after the passengers on the 25-minute flight, which subsequently halved to 12 minutes as a result of reducing the separation with other air traffic along the route taken by the helicopter) and was in charge of reservations and ticketing. British Airways Helicopters, the wholly owned helicopter subsidiary of BA whose headquarters were located at Gatwick, provided the flightdeck crew and engineering support.

The service gave BCal's passengers easier access to flight connections at Heathrow, especially to destinations not served by scheduled flights from Gatwick at the time.

It was used by 60,000 passengers during the first year of its operation.

1978 was also the year BCal set up a task force headed by Gordon Davidson, BA's former Concorde director, to investigate the possibility of operating the Concorde supersonic airliner viably on the airline's long-haul route network as there were still two unsold, "white tail" examples available at that time.

Another important reason for BCal's decision to set up a Concorde task force was that the 1976 aviation policy review had exempted Concorde from the "spheres of influence" policy and therefore it was possible for BA to operate supersonic services to prime business and leisure destinations within BCal's sphere of influence, such as Lagos or Rio de Janeiro for example. To ward off this potential threat, BCal's senior management decided to develop its own Concorde plans, either independently or in partnership with BA.

The most obvious choice for a supersonic service was Gatwick—Lagos, the backbone and main money spinner of BCal's scheduled operation. BCal's Concorde task force's brief was to assess the viability of a second daily all-premium supersonic service complementing the airline's existing daily subsonic, mixed-class widebody service on this route.

BCal put in a bid to acquire one of the remaining two "white tail" aircraft. The bid was not successful.

However, BCal eventually arranged for two aircraft to be leased from BA and Aérospatiale respectively and to have them maintained by either BA or Air France. It became necessary to find additional work for BCal's envisaged two-strong Concorde fleet to increase the aircraft's utilisation, thus permitting a cost-effective operation. Therefore, BCal decided to use the second aircraft to launch a supersonic service between Gatwick and Atlanta, with a technical stop at either Gander or Halifax. It also considered using the aircraft to serve Houston and points on its South American network at a later stage.

Both supersonic services were to be launched at the start of the 1980 summer timetable period.

In 1979, the airline took delivery of its delayed third and fourth McDonnell Douglas DC-10-30 widebodied aircraft during the first and third quarter. This permitted the aircraft's introduction on its daily Gatwick—Houston schedule as well as the replacement of the remaining 707-operated services on its mid- and South Atlantic routes. The narrow-bodied capacity released was used to add frequencies on existing routes as well as to launch services to new medium- and long-haul destinations. As a result, BCal launched a fourth weekly service to Brazil. It also launched a new route to Oran and added Quito and Guayaquil to the mid-Atlantic schedule. The company furthermore increased frequencies on its short-haul routes. A fourth daily round-trip was added to both Gatwick—Manchester and Gatwick—Brussels. A third daily frequency operating on week days was added to the Newcastle—Amsterdam sector of BCal's Glasgow—Newcastle—Amsterdam regional route.

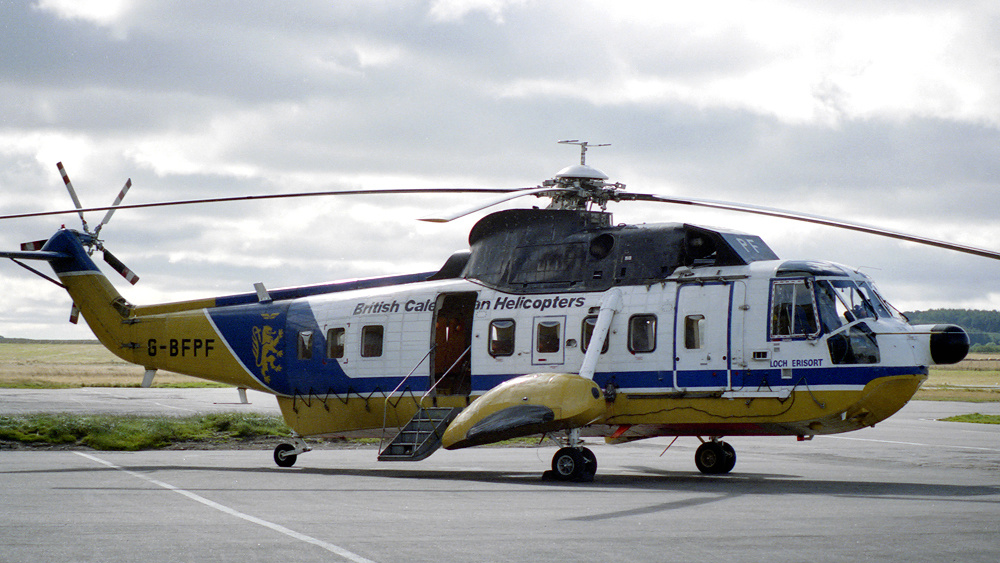
A British Caledonian Helicopters Sikorsky S-61N at Aberdeen Airport in May 1986

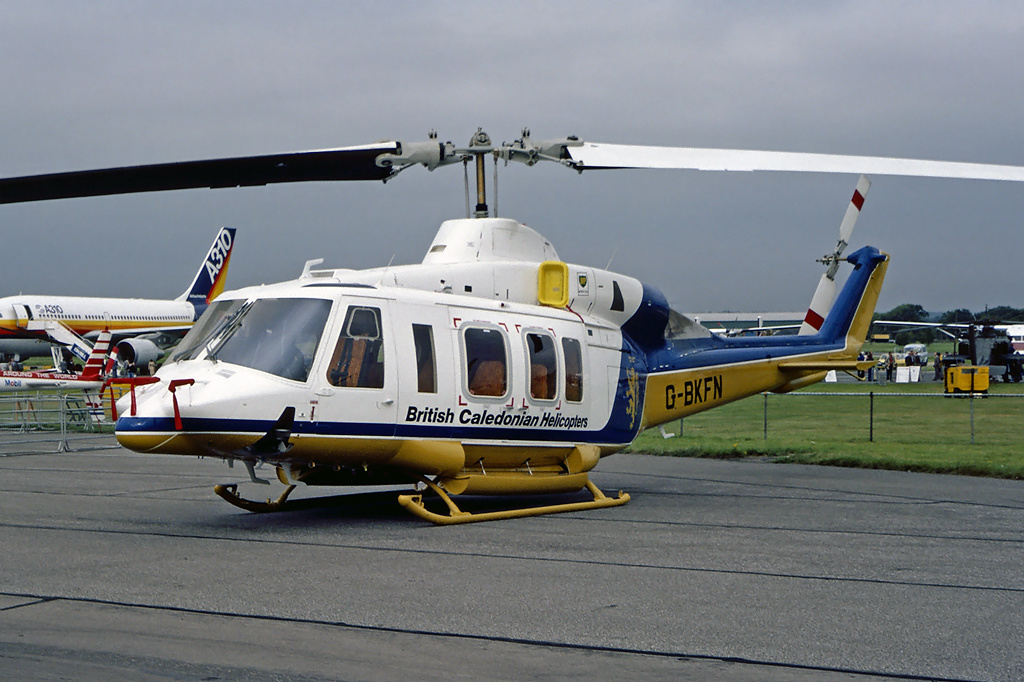
A British Caledonian Helicopters Bell 214ST at Aberdeen Airport

During that year, BCal also established a wholly owned helicopter subsidiary and it placed the UK launch order for a brand-new widebodied aircraft, the Airbus A310.

This was also the time BCal came up with a proposal to create a new network of European low-fare services. These were to be marketed under the trademark Miniprix and were meant to counter Laker Airways's plans for a pan-European Skytrain operation. Excluding BCal's existing four European destinations, it envisaged linking Gatwick with 20 additional points on the Continent. These services were to be operated during off-peak times, initially using the airline's existing narrowbody aircraft. Only six of 22 licences applied for were granted but even those did not lead to routes as the Department of Trade would not start discussions with the European authorities, which they believed would be blocked due to the destination countries' domestic concerns. None of Laker's 36 applications were approved.

BCal was evaluating both the McDonnell Douglas MD-80 narrowbody as well as the Airbus A310 and Boeing 767 widebodies as suitable long-term replacements for its existing narrow-bodied aircraft on these routes.

BCal's setbacks during 1979 included continuing frustration of the airline's desire to launch scheduled services to Scandinavia despite the conclusion of a new Anglo-Scandinavian bilateral air services agreement The airline's widebodied fleet — three McDonnell Douglas DC-10-30s — was grounded during the second quarter following the American Airlines flight 191 crash (a DC-10-10's engine pylon separated at take off) in May that year.

With their DC-10s grounded, BCal took a short-term lease of a 747 to provide adequate capacity on its Nigerian trunk routes. BCal also operated a Dan-Air Comet on short-term lease between Gatwick and Tripoli while the 707s normally used on that service were redeployed to operate a reduced schedule to Houston and South America. In addition to these aircraft, a Boeing 707-120B was leased during that period as well to cover the shortfall in capacity.

=== Network expansion ===
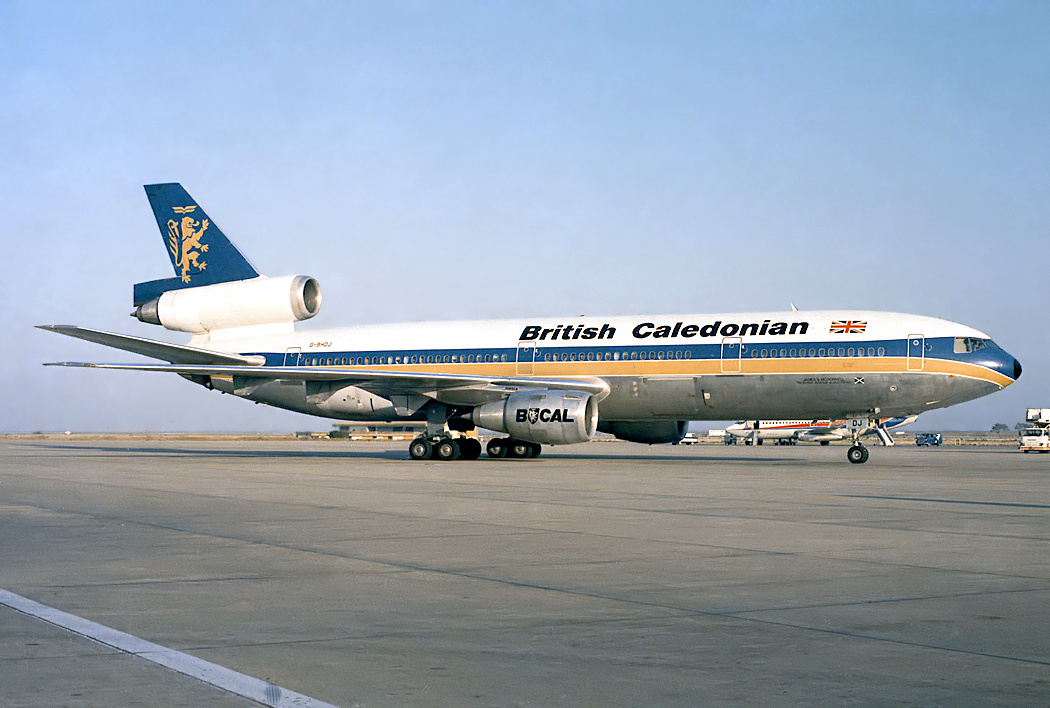
McDonnell Douglas DC-10-30, one of BCals's new aircraft in 1980, at Faro Airport in 1986

BCal took delivery of three more McDonnell Douglas DC-10-30s in 1980.

These planes enabled the launch of new routes – to Atlanta on 1 June, and to Hong Kong on 1 August, though in the latter Cathay Pacific and Laker Airways were also permitted without restriction on frequency or fares. Routes to San Juan, Puerto Rico's Isla Verde International Airport, and Dallas/Fort Worth followed on 26 October. It also enabled the airline to replace the Boeing 707s, with which it had inaugurated another new route to St. Louis in April of that year, with its newly delivered DC-10 widebodies at the end of October when St. Louis became a stop on the new Dallas/Fort Worth route. During that year, the company also added Tangier to its North African network.

This accelerated pace of growth made BCal the fastest growing member airline of the Association of European Airlines (AEA) in both 1980 and 1981.

BCal received a boost during 1980, when the Civil Aviation Authority (CAA) approved carriers (BCal, Cathay Pacific and Laker – subject to ratification) on the London – Hong Kong route to be able to pick up and put down passengers at intermediate stops in the Gulf states as the Hong Kong route was not otherwise expected to generate enough revenue for four carriers. For BCal this meant using their Dubai refuelling stop to carry passengers, cargo and mail between London and Dubai and Dubai and Hong Kong, despite objections from British Airways (BA) which already had such rights for Dubai and Bahrain.

BCal's 10th anniversary on 30 November 1980 coincided with the completion of its new corporate headquarters — aptly named Caledonian House — in Crawley's Lowfield Heath area close to the airline's Gatwick base. It was the first purpose-built headquarters in the company's history, which was designed to accommodate all 1,100 office-based staff at the airline's Gatwick base under one roof.

The high oil price during that period was a mixed blessing for BCal. It helped the airline fill its premium cabins on its oil-related business routes to Nigeria, Libya and Texas. On the other hand, the escalation of the jet fuel price and the fact that the high price of oil had considerably worsened the severe recession in Britain at that time significantly increased the company's operating costs, while at the same time reducing overall demand for its flights. BCal therefore decided to reduce off-peak frequencies on most of its short-haul routes from the start of the 1980/81 winter timetable period. This also included combining week-end, off-peak flights from Gatwick to Glasgow, Edinburgh and Manchester by converting non-stop flights into one-stop operations.

Among the set-backs BCal suffered at that time were the CAA's rejection of its application to serve Manila (Philippines) from Hong Kong or Singapore and BA's successful lobbying of the Government to revoke BCal's long-standing Gatwick—Bahrain—Singapore exempt charter licence in return for having granted it permission to launch a fully fledged scheduled service to Hong Kong.

BCal ended the 1979/80 financial year with a healthy profit of £9.7 million.

BCal received another new DC-10-30 in 1981 enabled the airline to increase frequencies on the prime long-haul routes to West Africa from seven to 10 weekly round-trips. It also permitted a frequency increase on the Gatwick—Dubai—Hong Kong route from four to five weekly round-trips.

At the start of the 1981/82 winter timetable period, BCal added Douala (Cameroon) to its network.

Also in 1981, BCal opened a new engine overhaul plant at Prestwick Airport near Glasgow in Scotland. The new engine overhaul plant was owned and run by Caledonian Airmotive, a dedicated, wholly owned subsidiary of the airline, which had been set up with technical support from GE.

BCal's search for a more fuel-efficient replacement for its ageing BAC One-Eleven fleet — especially, the range-limited One-Eleven 200s — acquired a new sense of urgency during 1981 against a backdrop of further escalating fuel prices. The airline was evaluating both the new BAe ATP turboprop for entry into service during 1986 and the BAe 146, the UK aircraft manufacturer's new, four-engined regional jet that was due to enter service in 1983, in addition to the McDonnell Douglas MD-80 and the new Boeing 737-300. Both British Aerospace types were rejected because it was felt that they had insufficient range to permit non-stop flights from Gatwick to some of the more distant points BCal already served or planned to serve in Europe and North Africa. Moreover, BCal felt that operating a turboprop on trunk routes would meet with passenger resistance as by that time most people had become accustomed to travelling on jets on these routes.

In 1981, BCal applied to the UK and Australian authorities for permission to launch a fully fledged, three-class scheduled service between Gatwick and Brisbane (via Colombo and Melbourne), and between Gatwick and Adelaide (via Perth), at a frequency of two flights a week each, in both directions. BCal proposed to inaugurate what would have been the first ever scheduled operation "Down Under" by a wholly private, British independent airline with McDonnell Douglas DC-10-30s. BCal wanted this to be a joint operation with Ansett Airlines, one of Australia's two leading contemporary domestic airlines, and held out the prospect of placing an order for brand-new, higher capacity Boeing 747-200SUDs (Note: Stretched Upper Deck) to replace the DC-10s on that route as soon as this was justified by increased demand. It also promised to give a major boost to Australia's inbound tourism from the UK and to deliver a steady stream of international transfer passengers to Ansett. BCal's application did not succeed, mainly because of British Airways's and Qantas's determined opposition to any move by the authorities in the UK and Australia to dilute the lucrative BA-Qantas duopoly on the "kangaroo route". The CAA turned down BCal's application although it considered it superior to a rival application by Laker Airways as it felt that there was no realistic chance of obtaining reciprocal approval for the proposed service from the relevant Australian authorities, as long as there was no desire on their part to license a second Australian carrier as well. It did promise to look favourably on the application if BCal re-submitted it with specific proposals for a joint Anglo-Australian operation, once Australia no longer opposed licensing additional carriers on that route.

BCal ended its 1980/81 financial year with a £6.2 million loss as a result of high fuel prices, a major recession on both sides of the Atlantic and heavy route development costs.

=== Expanding eastwards ===
As a result of the network structure BCal had inherited from BUA, an exclusive north–south airline, it became a predominantly north–south orientated carrier as well. The predominant north–south route structure had been further reinforced by the 1976 "spheres of influence" policy, which had locked the airline's long-haul operation into two continents — Africa and South America.

BCal's senior management realised that it needed to develop the traffic flows across its network in an east–west direction to increase the network's reach and to enable its passengers to make omnidirectional flight connections. This was also essential to enable the airline to increase its economies of scale and to reach the minimum size envisaged in the Edwards report.

BCal's new Gatwick—Dubai—Hong Kong route was intended to be just the first step in this expansion to the East. The Hong Kong route had come about as a result of the UK government decision in 1979 to open up the lucrative route between London and the Crown Colony of Hong Kong to additional competition. This was to be provided by a second British scheduled carrier to ease the shortage of capacity passengers were experiencing at peak times on the monopoly service operated by BA from Heathrow to Hong Kong. BCal, Laker and Cathay Pacific, Hong Kong's airline and its de facto "flag carrier", all applied to the CAA.

BCal had proposed running a conventional scheduled service from Gatwick to Hong Kong via Dubai utilising its rapidly growing fleet of McDonnell Douglas DC-10-30 widebodies in a three-class configuration featuring a first and an executive class in addition to an economy cabin. BCal had also agreed to offer a limited number of low fares that would match the lowest fares Laker had proposed. The CAA decided to license BCal to operate unlimited scheduled services between London and Hong Kong., rejecting both Cathay Pacific's and Laker's applications, clearing the way for BCal to become the second British scheduled carrier on that route.

However, Hong Kong's Air Transport Licensing Authority (ATLA) unexpectedly refused to endorse BCal because many influential people in the Crown Colony felt very upset that Cathay Pacific was going to be excluded from one of the world's most lucrative air routes. This caused a minor diplomatic row between the UK government and the colonial administration in Hong Kong. Cathay Pacific immediately began a back-door lobbying campaign in the Crown Colony as well as in London, stressing that it had invested millions of pounds in the British economy at a time of high unemployment in the UK by placing large orders for Rolls-Royce RB211-powered Boeing 747s. The UK government allowed Cathay Pacific and Laker to appeal to John Nott, the British Secretary of State for Trade and Industry, against the CAA's decision. Nott overturned the CAA's decision opening the route to all three without imposing any restrictions on service frequencies.

With the competition from Cathay Pacific, BCal decided to operate only four weekly round-trips instead of a daily service they had originally planned. Cathay Pacific commenced a thrice-weekly service between Hong Kong and Gatwick via Bahrain on 17 July 1980 ahead of BCal, which began its four-times-a-week Gatwick—Hong Kong service via Dubai on 1 August 1980.

=== Routes to Europe ===
BA's decided to abandon the short-haul routes it had been operating from London Gatwick at low frequencies since 1978 and to surrender a number of unused licences to the CAA: BCal, Laker Airways and Dan-Air requested transfer of these licences to themselves. BCal applied to take over BA's London Gatwick—Frankfurt route and a dormant Gatwick—Geneva licence and received licences for both routes.

The fairly liberal bilateral air services agreements between the UK and Germany as well as between the UK and Switzerland enabled BCal to commence double daily flights to Frankfurt and 10 services a week to Geneva within a relatively short time span following the award of the licences. This was the first time since 1974 that BCal was able to launch new routes from Gatwick to Europe. These were BCal's first scheduled services to Germany and Switzerland, which were going to be important sources of feeder traffic for the airline's long-haul services from Gatwick.

The launch of the two new routes coincided with the introduction of a dedicated business class cabin on all of BCal's short-haul flights to Europe, the first time since a brief period in the early 1970s during which it had offered a first class on the Gatwick—Paris route. BCal used the Executive Class brand for both its new European and its longer established long-haul business class.

=== Falklands War and re-entry into the charter market ===
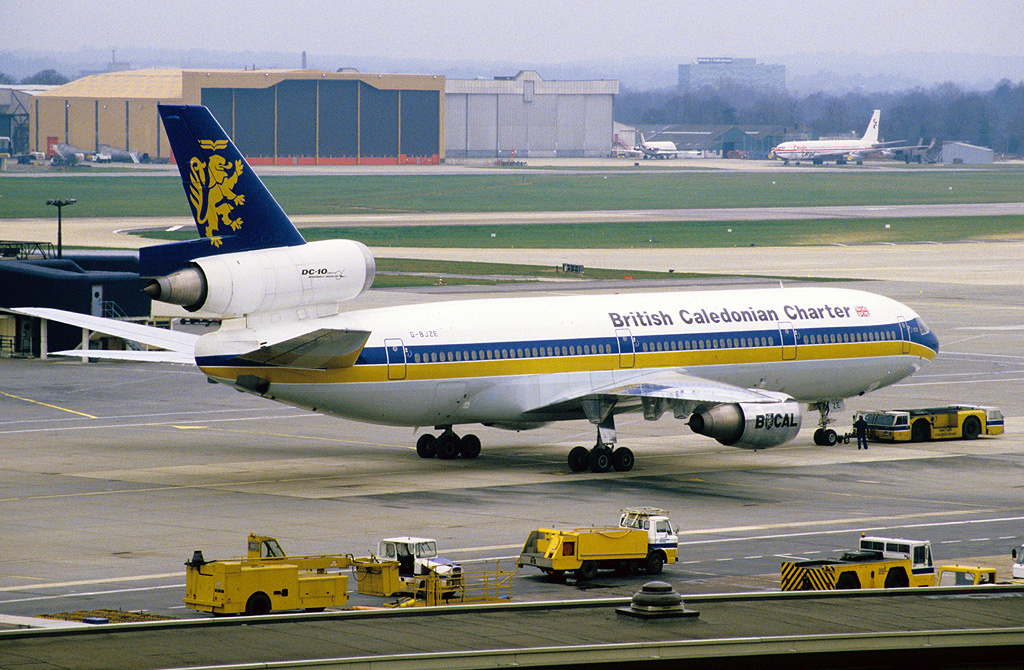
This British Caledonian Charter McDonnell Douglas DC-10-10 at Gatwick in March 1984 was one of two acquired from bankrupt Laker Airways in 1983.

The 1982 Falklands War was an unexpected, major setback for BCal. Argentina closed its airspace and airports to all UK-based airlines and UK-registered aircraft and Peru followed suit. This was the loss of the most profitable parts of BCal's South American network, especially Buenos Aires — its most profitable destination in that part of the world — and the lucrative "fifth freedom" traffic rights between Madrid and Buenos Aires. The remaining routes to Brazil, Venezuela and Colombia did not generate sufficient traffic to be profitable on their own, even after a reduction in frequencies. With one of its eight McDonnell Douglas DC-10-30 suddenly surplus to its long-haul scheduled requirements, the airline had to look for alternative work to increase long-haul fleet utilisation.

Laker Airways's collapse at the beginning of February of that year provided BCal with additional work to utilise its spare aircraft capacity. With Laker gone, BCal was able to relaunch a daily service between Gatwick and Los Angeles, acquire six aircraft from the failed carrier's and to move into the hangar Laker had occupied at Gatwick. The ex-Laker aircraft that joined BCal's fleet included two DC-10-10s and four BAC One-Eleven 300s. BCal used the DC-10-10s to set up a new charter subsidiary named British Caledonian Airways Charter in a joint venture with the Rank Organisation The latter aircraft and three second-hand One-Eleven 500s that had been acquired from other sources replaced BCal's seven, ageing One-Eleven 200s.

Despite being a difficult year for BCal, it managed to stay in the black during that period. The airline made a pre-tax profit of £1.1 million, which translated into a £300,000 retained profit for the financial year to 31 October 1982.

=== Launching a new narrow-bodied aircraft ===
In 1983, BCal became the first non-French airline to order the Airbus A320. BCal placed a firm order for seven A320s and took an option on another three, with deliveries of the aircraft on firm order due to commence during the spring of 1988. The options were subsequently converted into firm orders as well.

Although the A320 was bigger than BCal's actual requirement, it was the technologically most advanced contender with 27% lower seat-mile costs than the BAC One-Eleven.

BCal intended to use its A320s to replace the ageing One-Elevens on its short-haul European and medium-haul North African routes.

1983 turned out to be another tough year for BCal. Continuing restrictions on the airline's South American services and other schedule cutbacks in response to the early 1980s recession reduced aircraft utilisation. This led to a decision to fill spare long-haul aircraft capacity with third-party work. BCal's third-party business included a twice weekly Gatwick—Luxembourg—Barbados service on behalf of Caribbean Airways, weekly Gatwick—Frankfurt—Mahé services under contract to Air Seychelles and a wet lease agreement with Surinam Airways to operate a weekly Paramaribo—Gatwick—Amsterdam service. The Caribbean Airways and Air Seychelles contracts used spare capacity on BCal's DC-10-30s, while the Surinam Airways wet lease utilised the ex-Laker DC-10-10s operated by British Caledonian Charter. Although BCal's airline operation incurred a loss of £655,000 in the financial year to 31 October 1983, the airline managed to make an overall pre-tax profit of £2.6 million. This translated into a £300,000 retained profit at group level.

=== Reorganisation and improved industrial relations ===
During the early 1980s, BCal and its affiliated companies adopted a new organisational structure to reflect the growth in the group's business and the diversification into new activities. Caledonian Aviation Group (renamed British Caledonian Group in 1986) became the new holding company. It had an issued share capital of £20 million in June 1987. Apart from the airline, subsidiaries included British Caledonian Aircraft Trading, British Caledonian Flight Training, British Caledonian Helicopters, Caledonian Airmotive, Caledonian Hotel Holdings and Caledonian Leisure Holdings.

In addition, this was the time BCal, which had always prided itself on its industrial relations record, claiming it never lost a full day's operation as a result of industrial action began implementing a new co-operative, industrial relations strategy. The airline termed its new industrial relations strategy "The Way Ahead". This strategy was designed to make the airline the most productive among its peers in Europe by redefining established working practices. Its aim was to achieve a significant reduction in labour costs through increased productivity, thereby putting the firm ahead of its rivals. It was hoped that this would ultimately translate into higher profits as well.

The strategy sought to gain acceptance (among eligible BCal employees) by offering them a higher basic rate of pay and a greater personal involvement in the management's decision-making process in return for forgoing overtime pay and agreeing to new, more efficient working practices that resulted in increased labour productivity.

The successful implementation of the new industrial relations strategy in 1983 made BCal employees the highest paid airline staff in the UK at the time.

=== A major shakeup ===
In 1984, the UK Government began to prepare then wholly state-owned BA for privatisation in earnest by appointing a new board of directors with several years' experience in private industry and by changing its legal status from a Crown Corporation to a public limited company. BCal's senior management saw this as a major threat to the company's continuing existence as the UK's second largest international scheduled airline. According to BCal's own calculations, the relevant figures for 1983 had shown that BA alone accounted for 83% of all UK scheduled airline capacity measured in tonne kilometres as opposed to a mere 13–14% for BCal. These figures also showed that BA carried seven-and-a-half times as many passengers as BCal, (Note: 83% vs. 11% of all scheduled UK airline passengers) and that Heathrow's share of international scheduled air traffic was five-and-a-half times greater than Gatwick's (79% and 14% respectively). This meant that a privatised BA on this scale would enjoy far greater financial clout than BCal. It also meant that BA's market power would be disproportionate compared with that of any other UK airline as a result of its much greater economies of scale. Furthermore, the Government's decision to proceed with BA's privatisation inevitably meant the end of the "Second Force" policy, which had guided BCal's development since its inception. In addition, the transfer of BA's ownership from the public to the private sector meant that BCal could no longer rely on the indirect protection Government ownership afforded it to prevent BA from abusing its power — for example, by engaging in anti-competitive behaviour against BCal.

To redress this competitive imbalance, BCal proposed to the Government the transfer of several of BA's most lucrative long-haul routes to itself — including BA's profitable Saudi Arabian routes as well as that airline's routes (Note: including unused licences) to Abu Dhabi, Kuwait, Harare, Islamabad, Kolkata, Singapore, Kuala Lumpur, Tokyo, Seoul and Beijing. BCal also proposed the transfer of BA's short-/medium-haul routes from Heathrow to Vienna, Helsinki, Athens, Istanbul, Malta and Larnaca, which it wanted to serve from Gatwick, and the removal of capacity restrictions on its existing short-haul European routes from Gatwick. The airline furthermore proposed to take over BA's services from Gatwick to the Iberian peninsula and that airline's services from Gatwick to the Caribbean. Moreover, BCal wanted the Government to pursue additional opportunities for dual designation in its [re-]negotiations of existing and new bilateral air services agreements with foreign governments on its behalf — in particular, to the Far East and Australia as well as to East and South Africa and Canada at a later stage. BCal was prepared to pay BA between £200 million and £250 million for the routes to be transferred as well as for the associated staff and infrastructure. BCal estimated that it would require nine more aircraft — six long-haul and three short-haul planes — to operate the additional routes. It also reckoned that this would allow it to grow to the minimum size that was required to turn its Gatwick base into an efficient hub to enable it to prosper in the post-BA privatisation environment. BCal was furthermore of the opinion that this would allow it to increase its scheduled capacity to about 20% of all UK scheduled airline capacity while permitting BA to continue in its role as the dominant UK scheduled carrier, which would still have accounted for 70% of total scheduled capacity.

BCal's senior management told the Government that the only alternatives to this proposal were shifting its existing scheduled operation from Gatwick to Heathrow's then new Terminal 4, which it expected to produce an additional annual profit of at least £20 million in the first year itself, or to merge with BA. BCal's senior management also told the Government that its preferred option was to remain at Gatwick and to strengthen its position there through the proposed route transfers to enable BCal to turn it into an efficient hub-and-spoke operation that would allow it to compete with BA and the giant US carriers on a level playing field. The airline's senior management furthermore told the Government that a merger with BA was its least preferred option.

Lord King of Wartnaby, BA's newly appointed chairman, infamously dismissed BCal's offer to purchase BA's assets for £200 million + as a "smash-and-grab raid". He made it clear to the Government that he and his fellow board members opposed transferring any of these assets to BCal. Lord King also left the Government in no doubt that it would find itself in the embarrassing situation of having to dismiss the entire board if it imposed a route transfer to BCal against the BA board's will.

In June 1984, BCal's original proposal to share out BA's routes ahead of the latter's privatisation was followed up by a plan BCal had jointly formulated with eight other UK independent airlines. This plan sought to give the independents a greater share of the UK's air transport market by reducing BA's share. Measured in terms of capacity tonne kilometres (CTKs), it would have increased the independents' share from 17% to 40% while reducing BA's share from 83% to 60%. For BCal alone this would have doubled its share from 15% to 30%. In their submission the independents claimed that privatising BA in its existing shape would allow it to dominate and destroy its competition. They also regarded BA's continuing dominance as incompatible with the CAA's goal of a less-regulated air transport market. BA countered the independents' contentions by maintaining that rather than benefiting consumers through increased competition, the independents' intent generally, and BCal's in particular, would merely result in substituting its own services with those of other carriers.

The opposing views of Britain's leading independent airlines on one hand and BA on the other regarding the future shape of the British air transport industry led to a review of the Government's airline competition policy by the CAA. The result was CAP 500, a Government-commissioned White Paper in which the CAA outlined the findings of its review of existing UK airline competition policy. CAP 500 also contained a number of recommendations that were designed to ensure that a competitive balance between BCal and the UK's other independent airlines on one hand and a privatised BA on the other was maintained.

The CAA broadly endorsed BCal's proposals by recommending the transfer of BA's routes to Saudi Arabia and Harare as well as its Caribbean and Iberian peninsula routes to BCal. The CAA also recommended removing all capacity restrictions on BCal's existing short-haul European routes. It furthermore advocated increasing the opportunities for designating BCal as the second UK flag carrier on additional long-haul routes where BA was the only UK scheduled airline. This was to be achieved through appropriate amendments to the relevant bilateral agreements.

Full implementation of CAP 500 would have resulted in strengthening BCal's position at Gatwick by making it the sole UK scheduled airline on all trunk routes from that airport while maintaining BA's status as the dominant UK scheduled carrier at Heathrow.

In the event, under pressure from BA's board and to ensure BA's successful flotation, the Government decided not to accept the CAA's recommendations in full. Instead, it settled on a limited route transfer from BA to BCal. This entailed transferring BA's profitable Saudi Arabian routes to Dhahran and Jeddah to BCal to add to its new route to the Saudi capital Riyadh. The Government thought that this would strengthen BCal by making it the sole UK flag carrier to all of Saudi Arabia and that it would tie in well with BCal's "linking the oil capitals of the world" corporate strategy, which it had successfully pursued since the late 1970s. To be seen as even-handed by both parties and to counter BA's accusations of displaying favouritism towards BCal, the Government required BCal to hand over to BA its loss-making South American routes as well as its unused licences to serve a number of additional destinations in the US and Morocco.

The limited route transfer on which the Government had decided was far less ambitious than either BCal's own proposals or the CAA's recommendations and would still leave it far smaller than BA and the giant US carriers. Although this was less than it had bargained for, BCal's senior management decided to accept the Government's decision because they estimated the two Saudi Arabian routes BA was going to transfer to be worth £18 million in additional annual profits. This would be only £2 million less than what BCal expected to earn in extra yearly profits from its existing network had it been able to transfer its entire operation to Heathrow. Given these magnitudes and Heathrow's already tight slot situation at peak times, BCal's senior management considered this difference in annual profitability immaterial.

The route transfer was to take place at the start of the 1985 summer timetable period.

=== Reaching new heights ===
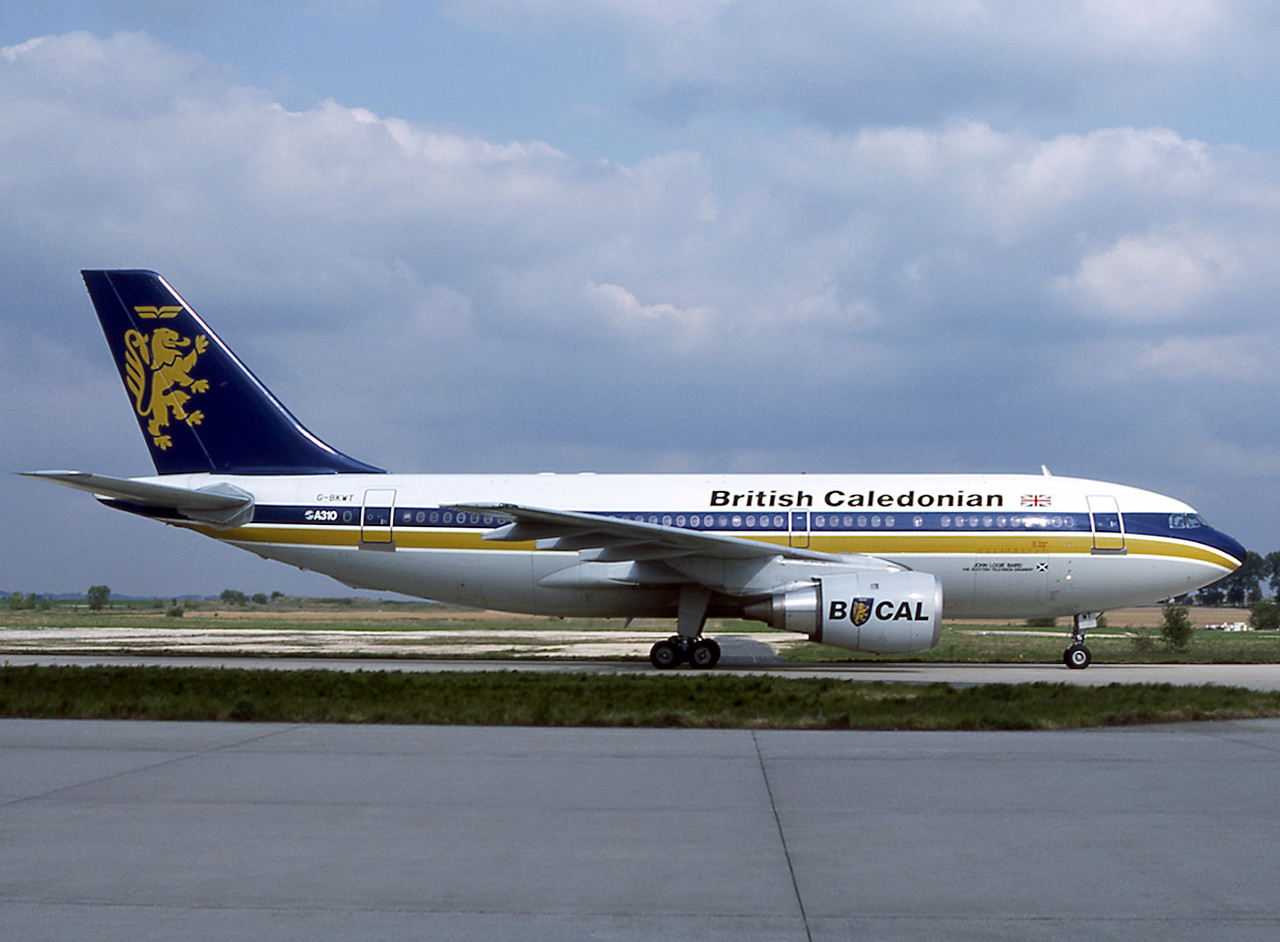
A BCal Airbus A310-200 seen at Paris Charles de Gaulle in 1984

1984 was a record year for BCal. It ended the financial year to 31 October 1984 with a pre-tax profit of £17.1 million, which surpassed the record financial performance of 1978. This translated into a £10.9 million retained profit at group level. These profits were the result of improvements in the British economy, which had recovered from the severe recession of the early 1980s, and BCal beginning to reap the benefits of the new industrial relations strategy it had begun implementing the year before.

Also in 1984, BCal received two brand-new A310-200 widebodies at its Gatwick base.

In 1984, the CAA awarded BCal a licence to commence scheduled services from Gatwick to Riyadh and authorised the airline to operate dedicated scheduled services to Abu Dhabi, Doha, Dubai and Muscat, rather than serving these destinations as intermediate points only.

Libreville was added to the network during 1984. At the start of the summer timetable period, frequencies to Frankfurt and Geneva increased to three daily round-trips. Connectair and RFG joined the British Caledonian Commuter scheme adding new, regional feeder routes from Gatwick to Antwerp and Paderborn. Connectair also assumed the operation of BCal's Gatwick—Brussels route. BCal furthermore decided to withdraw its Glasgow—Newcastle—Amsterdam regional service to focus its operations on providing worldwide scheduled services from London only.

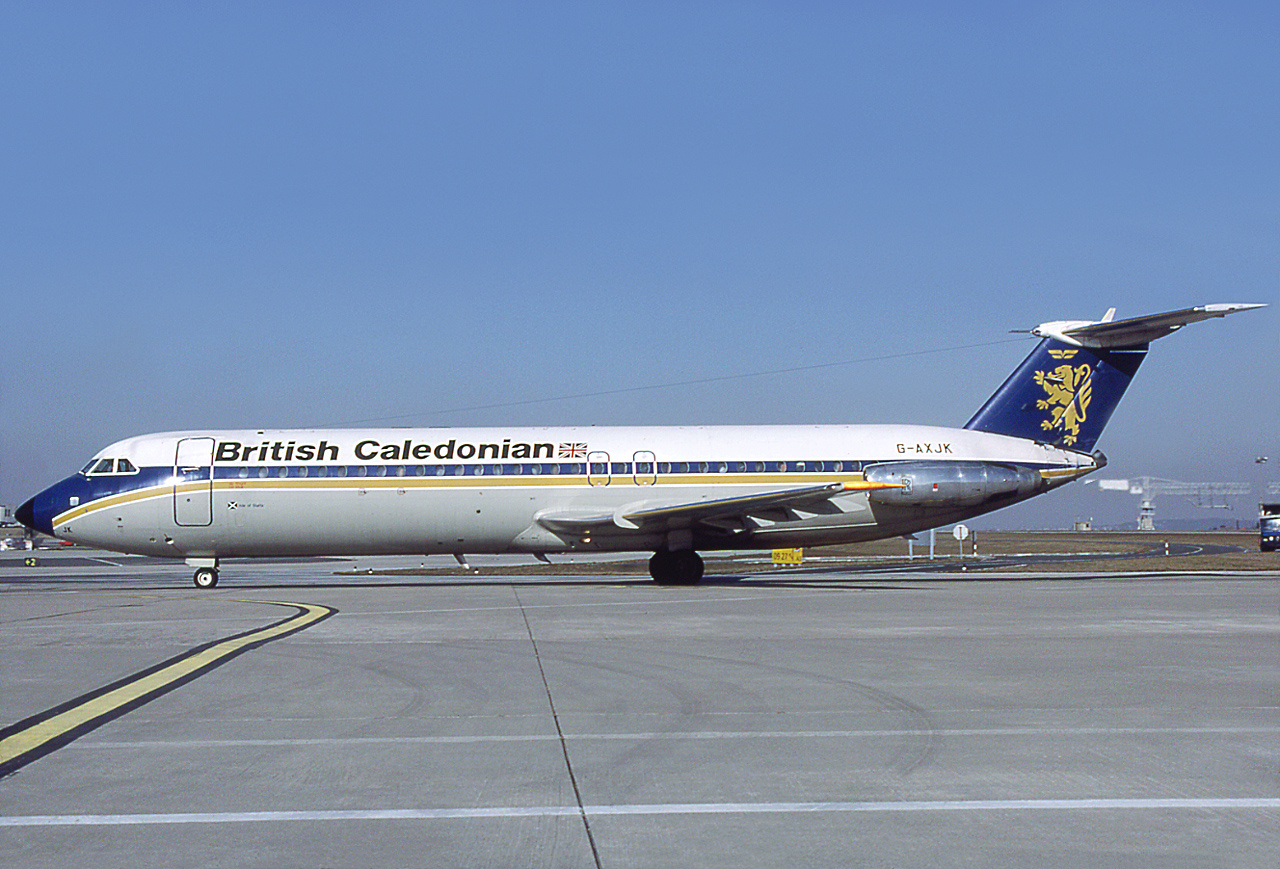
Seen here at Paris Charles de Gaulle in 1985, this former British United BAC One-Eleven 500 was among 13 BCal hush-kitted in the mid-1980s.

BCal decided to retire the four ex-Laker One-Eleven 300s and to acquire another second-hand One-Eleven 500, giving it a total fleet strength of 13. Standardizing its short-haul, narrow-bodied fleet on the same aircraft sub-type enhanced its ability to interchange aircraft across that fleet. As part of a "mid-life update", of its entire One-Eleven fleet, hush kits were fitted to comply with stricter, post-1985 noise abatement rules. This was to keep the One-Eleven effective until more modern aircraft were delivered in 1988.

1984 also marked the end of the long-haul, narrow-bodied era for BCal when the last Boeing 707 left its fleet.

1985 was the year that broke all previous financial records at BCal. The pre-tax profit in the financial year to 31 October 1985 reached an all-time high of £21.4 million. The retained group profit for that period was £11.3 million. The profit attributable to BCal's airline operation represented an improvement of almost £12 million compared with the previous year's results. During that year, BCal carried 8% more passengers and 20% more cargo compared with the year before.

The limited route transfer on which BCal had agreed with BA and the Government took effect at the start of the 1985 summer timetable period, when BCal commenced scheduled operations from Gatwick to Dhahran and Jeddah, replacing the BA service from Heathrow. At the same time, BCal relinquished its traffic rights to Recife, Salvador, Rio, São Paulo, San Juan, Caracas and Bogotá. BA acquired these traffic rights and began serving most of these destinations from Heathrow.

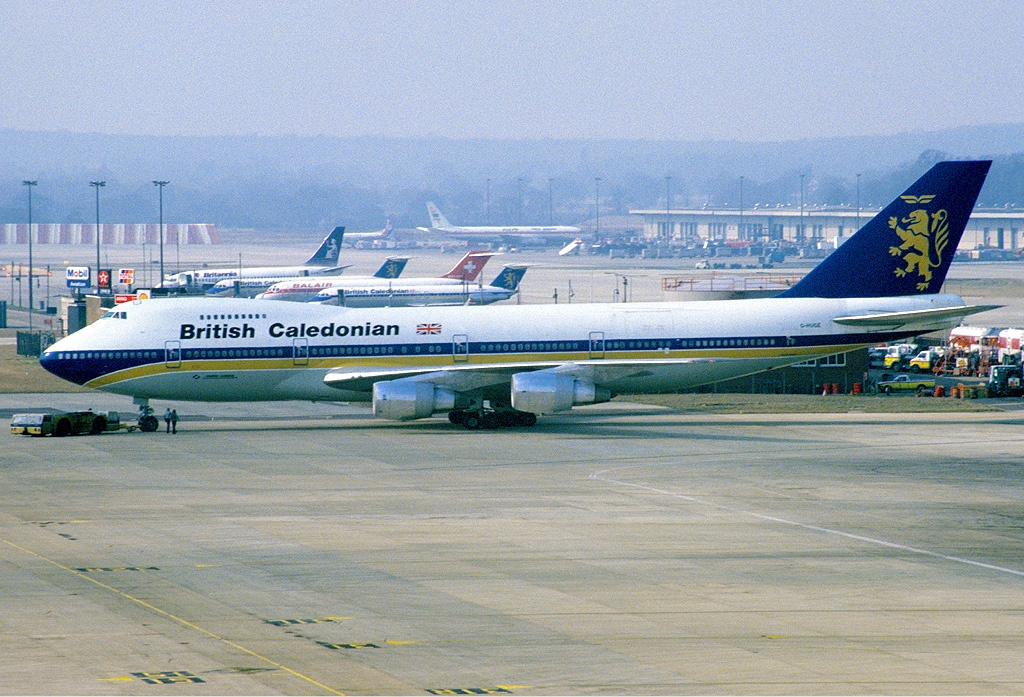
Seen here at London Gatwick in 1986, BCal used this former Royal Jordanian Boeing 747-200M for its summer 1985 Gatwick–JFK re-launch, including a door-to-door limousine service at both ends.

A second 747 wearing BCal's full livery joined the fleet permitting the resumption of a daily service between Gatwick and New York's John F. Kennedy Airport (JFK) during the summer of 1985, after the airline's absence from that route for over a decade. BCal's 1985 re-launch of scheduled Gatwick—JFK services coincided with the introduction of its door-to-door limousine service for premium travellers.

The temporary lease of a Viscount sporting the full BCal livery for the duration of the 1985 summer timetable period enabled the airline to increase capacity on the Gatwick—Brussels route by replacing smaller aircraft Connectair had used to operate that service under the British Caledonian Commuter scheme and to add more capacity on week-ends on the busy Gatwick—Jersey route.

Two more, second-hand DC-10-30s were acquired to replace BCal's A310s, which left the fleet when the additional DC-10s arrived.

1985 also saw the establishment of British Caledonian Flight Training, a new flight crew training facility.

As Gatwick became busier, BCal's senior management called on the Government to ban all charter flights from the airport and to move those services to Stansted.

The Government decided to meet BCal's request for a ban on all charter flights from Gatwick half-way by agreeing to give preference to scheduled services in all future slot allocations at the airport.

=== A new airline for Europe ===
The collapse of the oil price during the mid-1980s had serious repercussions for BCal's revenue and profit projections as this impacted the oil-related business routes on which the airline had depended for most of its profits since the late 1970s. All of these routes carried fewer premium business travellers than anticipated. This in turn led to a sharp decline of those routes' profitability and, hence, their contribution to the airline's overall profitability. In the case of the newly acquired Saudi Arabian routes this meant that they delivered less than half the projected profits.

The limited route transfer had allowed BCal to grow its scheduled capacity to about 18% of all UK scheduled airline capacity, while BA only suffered an insignificant reduction in its share of total scheduled capacity.

BCal's 18% share was still far less than the minimum size BCal needed to acquire the economies of scale to compete with BA and the giant US carriers on a level playing field. This was also less than what had been envisaged in the Edwards report prior to BCal's formation. (Note: that report had considered 4 billion long-haul scheduled service seat miles (6.4 billion seat kilometres) per year by 1975 the minimum size for the "Second Force" to become economically viable)

This situation was unsatisfactory for the airline and unrewarding for its shareholders.

Therefore, under pressure from its controlling shareholder 3i, the search for a new, long-term strategy began.

As a consequence of its main shareholder's dissatisfaction, the British Caledonian Group's board of directors established contact with ILG's board in November 1985. The purpose of this meeting was to begin exploring ways of combining BCal's and Air Europe's separate short-haul operations in a new joint venture that would have enabled both airlines to acquire the economies of scale to compete with a privatised BA on a level playing field. Another objective of this exercise was to smooth out each other's peaks and troughs, for BCal's peaks occurred during week days while Air Europe's occurred on week-ends. This meant that both airlines could offer their spare capacities to each other to achieve an overall higher level of equipment utilisation and higher load factors throughout the week. ILG's dominant position in the inclusive tour market would also have helped BCal to significantly increase its generally low short-haul loads by filling seats that would otherwise remain empty with ILG's clients, especially on week-ends. A series of meetings ensued. The result was a 150-page study entitled An Airline for Europe. It envisaged the commencement of joint scheduled operations from Gatwick to Hamburg, Munich, Düsseldorf, Milan Linate and Nice in 1987. The next stage of development was to occur during the 1988/89 winter timetable period when further routes linking Gatwick with Copenhagen, Stockholm, Vienna, Rome and Athens were to be added. The study also envisaged adding services from Gatwick to Zürich, Dublin, Madrid and Lisbon at a later stage to enable the joint venture to acquire sufficient economies of scale to become a viable entity in the long term. However, it recognised that it might be difficult to implement the last stage of the envisaged expansion as the relevant routes had already been licensed to Dan-Air.

The study also made profit projections for each stage of the envisaged joint venture's development.

These were:

- £3.7 million for 1987/88.
- £5.5 million for 1988/89.
- £25.2 million for 1989/90.

The latter represented a return on total equity employed plus previously retained earnings of 18.2%. This was substantially better than BCal's short-haul operation could have hoped to achieve on its own.

Despite several rounds of talks being held that lasted well into the first half of 1986, both sides eventually decided not to proceed further with their joint venture study and to go their separate ways.

=== Unexpected reversal of fortunes ===
BCal had high hopes for 1986. It expected to make record profits representing a substantial improvement on the previous year's pre-tax profits of £21.4 million. The British Caledonian Group expected its turnover to exceed half-a-billion pounds while BCal expected to carry just under two-and-a-half million passengers. The year's crowning glory was to be the flotation of the British Caledonian Group on the London Stock Exchange.

Instead, 1986 turned out to be BCal's "annus horribilis" during which it faced its most acute crisis as a result of events beyond its control. The airline was never going to recover from this crisis, which ultimately sealed the company's fate.

The events that brought about a dramatic turn-around in BCal's fortunes plunging it into a £19.3 million pre-tax loss (translated into a £14.4 million retained group loss). included

- the American bombings of Libya during April 1986 in retaliation for that country's (at the time) alleged involvement in the bombing of La Belle nightclub in West Berlin, which injured over 200 and killed three.
- the world's worst nuclear accident in Chernobyl in the then Ukrainian Soviet Socialist Republic on 26 April 1986
- the adverse impact of the devaluation of the Nigerian currency on BCal's earnings from passenger and freight bookings originating in Nigeria and paid for in the local currency, which the Nigerian government of the day prevented from being repatriated to the UK.

The first two events almost emptied the cabins of BCal's widebodied planes plying the transatlantic routes linking Gatwick with Houston, Dallas/Fort Worth, Atlanta, New York JFK and Los Angeles because of a sudden surge in cancellations, especially from passengers based in the US. Many of BCal's American passengers cancelled or postponed their trips at that time because they feared retaliatory attacks by Libyan secret service agents and did not want to risk exposing themselves to the radioactive fallout from the Ukrainian nuclear catastrophe while conducting their business or spending their holidays in Europe. At the time, BCal's transatlantic scheduled services accounted for a quarter of the airline's worldwide revenues and 37% of its passenger traffic. The Libyan bombings also dashed any hopes BCal had to resume operations on its profitable Gatwick—Tripoli route later that year, resulting in a further loss of expected revenues and profits.

The third had a serious impact on BCal's finances at a time of crisis as it denied the airline speedy access to a substantial amount of money derived from passenger and cargo sales in its most important and most profitable overseas market. This resulted in a significant revenue loss.

What was already a bad situation for the airline was made worse by the continuing decline of the oil price, which had started the year before. The rapid fall in the oil price reduced the oil industry's spending power, thereby significantly reducing the number of oil-related business passengers planning to fly with BCal in future. As these passengers used to account for a major share of the airline's high-yield premium bookings, future revenue and profit projections needed to be revised as well to take account of much reduced demand for the company's most expensive tickets.

In addition, the Government announced the withdrawal of BCal's licence to operate the high-frequency Gatwick—Heathrow Airlink helicopter shuttle service as a result of the completion of the M25 London orbital motorway, thereby denying the airline's passengers easy access to connecting flights from Heathrow and depriving passengers travelling with airlines based at that airport of the opportunity to avail themselves of convenient onward connections from Gatwick. The resulting reduction in the number of passengers changing flights at BCal's Gatwick base had a detrimental effect on load factors on the airline's profitable long-haul routes. This in turn reduced the profitability of these routes, as well as the airline's overall profitability by an estimated £2 million per annum.

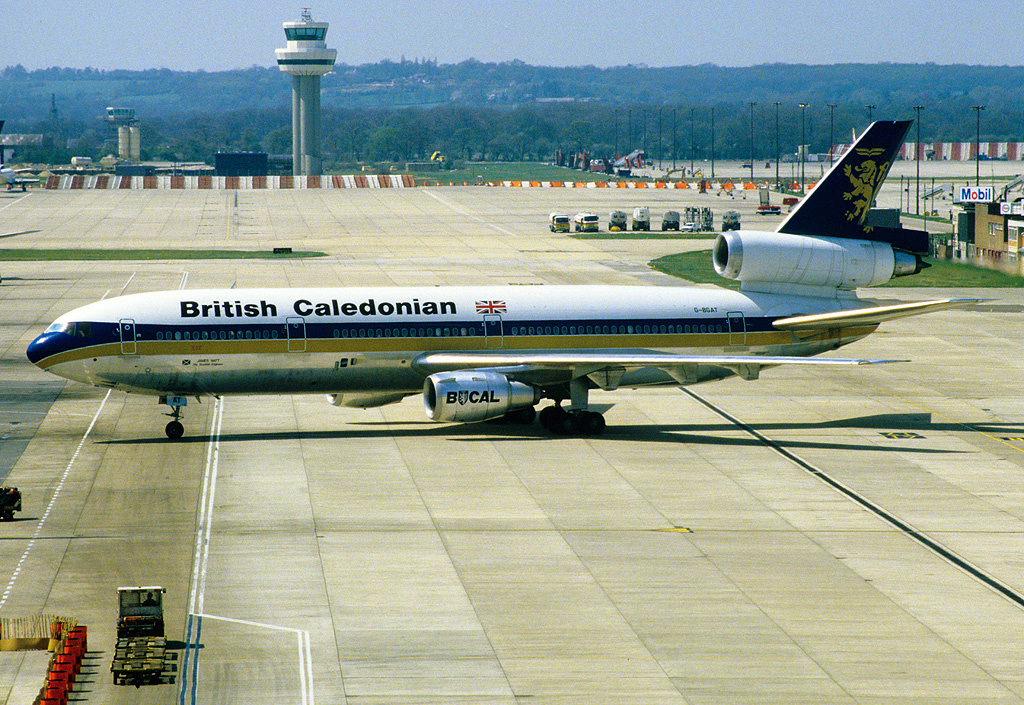
Seen here at London Gatwick in 1984, McDonnell Douglas DC-10-30 G-BGAT was one of the aircraft BCal sold to Continental Airlines in 1986.

As a result of the problems it was facing during that time, BCal announced 1,000 job losses out of a total worldwide workforce of 7,700 which given there was no overall reduction in services Flight International described as suggesting "that the slim down was overdue" It also needed to make adjustments to its schedule to take account of the expected changes in traffic patterns. This led to an immediate reduction in the number of weekly frequencies on BCal's underperforming Saudi Arabian routes. The aircraft capacity released was redeployed on BCal's well-performing route to Dubai and Hong Kong. (Note: increasing the number of weekly round-trips from seven to nine)

Altogether BCal suffered a total revenue loss of £80 million (Note: £35 million for losses related to the US military action in Libya and the Ukrainian nuclear catastrophe, another £35 million related to the devaluation of the Nigerian currency and £10 million for the voluntary severance programme to achieve a reduction in the head count) while the airline itself lost two-and-a-half million pounds every month at that time.

The airline embarked upon a major asset disposal programme to compensate for this significant revenue loss and to have sufficient funds to keep the business running. These asset disposals included the profitable sale of two, relatively young McDonnell Douglas DC-10-30 widebodied aircraft to Continental Airlines, the sale and lease-back of the entire 13-strong, short-haul BAC One-Eleven fleet, the sale of six of Caledonian Hotel Holdings' hotels, (Note: including the sale of both Copthorne hotels to Aer Lingus) the sale of Caledonian Airmotive to US-based Ryder Systems, the sale of Caledonian Leisure Holdings and the disposal of British Caledonian Helicopters the following year.

Despite facing a major crisis, BCal continued adding new aircraft, routes and flight frequencies in an effort to maintain a competitive operation.

Two more 747s joined the fleet during 1986. This permitted a major capacity increase on the popular Gatwick—Dubai—Hong Kong route.

During that year, Muscat, Gaborone and Aberdeen joined the network.

BCal's acquisition of a fifth 747 the following year permitted the launch of a new route from Gatwick to Tokyo on 31 May 1987, at a frequency of three return flights per week. In addition, for the first time in five years, two new European routes were launched from Gatwick. These served Milan Linate and Nice at a frequency of 13 and three return flights per week, respectively.

=== Merger discussions ===
By July 1987, BCal had already exhausted most of the proceeds from the asset disposal programme.

The proceeds from the sale of two DC-10s to Continental Airlines was all that was left to keep the airline in business. Senior management realised that the company was unlikely to survive on its own and that it needed to act fast if it wanted to avoid BCal's collapse.

Therefore, the search for a financially strong partner acquired a renewed sense of urgency.

Several rounds of talks that were aimed at achieving a full-scale merger ensued with various airlines in the UK, the US, Canada and Europe.

BCal's future prospects as a stand-alone, medium-sized airline operating a variety of short-, medium- and long-haul scheduled services were rapidly diminishing against a background of looming consolidation in the airline industry. This was driven by the giant US carriers that had begun channeling their traffic flows into powerful hub-and-spoke operations, rather than feeding these into the networks of BCal and other international partner airlines, in the wake of US deregulation. In addition, BA's impending privatisation and the Government's refusal to fully implement the recommendations contained in the CAA's airline competition White Paper meant that BCal was unable to acquire the economies of scale it needed to compete with these airlines on a level playing field. This prevented BCal from achieving higher volumes over which to spread its fixed costs. It also deprived the airline of the capacity to generate the funds to continue investing in fleet renewal, further network expansion and new information technology systems.

BCal's basic dilemma at the time can be summed up as follows:

It had become a mid-sized airline that was too large to be a specialist operator. Yet it was too small to compete with BA and the US giants in terms of economies of scale and scope. Concurrently, it was unable to match the lower costs of emerging Far East competitors, such as Cathay Pacific.

BCal's precarious financial position made it obvious for most of its rivals and seasoned industry observers that the ailing airline lacked the financial strength to survive on its own for much longer.

BCal had valuable traffic rights to operate scheduled services on a number of lucrative, long-haul routes to parts of the world that were not served by any other British airline at that time. It therefore became a desirable takeover target and a bidding war ensued between several potential suitors.

The chief protagonists in this takeover battle were BCal's archrival BA as well as ILG/Air Europe and SAS.

=== Proposed BA-BCal merger ===
On 16 July 1987, Sir Adam Thomson and Lord King of Wartnaby, chairmen of British Caledonian Group and British Airways respectively, surprisingly announced at a press conference the intention of the latter to acquire the former in an agreed £237 million bid. They had agreed on this deal only the day before. Officially this was presented as a "merger between equals" but within the industry it was widely acknowledged as a mutually agreed rescue deal to avoid the collapse of BCal. In addition, BA, which had been privatised only in February of that year, was keen to get hold of its main home-grown competitor's most valuable assets. These included BCal's lucrative traffic rights to those parts of the world BA could not serve itself as a result of the now defunct "Second Force" policy. This itself had resulted in a "spheres of influence" policy for BA and BCal that had prevented both airlines from competing with each other on a number of important long-haul routes. BA also saw this as a necessary move to fill the gaps in its global route map to acquire the economies of scale that would permit it to compete against the giant US carriers on a level-playing field. BCal's financial difficulties furthermore presented an opportunity for BA to forestall any competitive threat a revitalised BCal could pose to it in future, either on its own or in alliance with another airline. It therefore wanted to get hold of these assets before any competitor could lay its hands on them. Moreover, BA wanted to prevent BCal's assets from passing into the hands of any [partially] foreign-owned or controlled competitors. It felt that under such a scenario the long-term competitiveness of the entire UK air transport industry was threatened.

=== ILG/Air Europe's unsolicited counter bid ===
Following Sir Adam's outright rejection of ILG chairman Harry Goodman's offer to purchase BCal's short-haul operation, and to merge that operation with the short-haul operations of ILG subsidiary Air Europe in return for not having the proposed BA-BCal deal referred to the Monopolies and Mergers Commission (MMC), ILG decided at the end of July 1987 to launch a counter bid for the entire British Caledonian Group.

Air Europe was concerned that a new entity combining BA and BCal had the power to destroy the UK's remaining independent airlines, especially with regard to their ability to compete with such a behemoth. At the time, Air Europe had ambitions of its own to become a major short-haul scheduled operator. It was planning to launch 11 new routes from Gatwick to Europe, thereby replacing and enhancing the services BCal had provided. Given a combined BA-BCal's superior financial strength, considerably lower borrowing costs and far greater economies of scale, Air Europe's management felt that it would be imprudent to launch these new routes if it had to compete with BA out of Heathrow and Gatwick as well. Therefore, its parent ILG had decided to make a counter bid, which it hoped would either kill off BA's proposal to take over BCal lock, stock and barrel or result in it being referred to the MMC.

To enhance its credibility as a serious contender, Air Europe's bid contained a detailed proposal to return BCal to profitability by way of a reorganisation. This proposal had been prepared by a retired BA head of route planning whom ILG had specifically hired for this purpose. BCal would be split into four discrete businesses, each of which with its own management accountable for the performance of that unit. The businesses would be a long-haul operation under the BCal brand, a short-haul operation merged with Air Europe's existing short-haul operation using the BCal brand on business routes and the Air Europe brand in leisure markets, and an engineering and a ground handling unit.

The long-haul operation was to be re-equipped with a brand-new fleet comprising six Boeing 747-400s and 10 Boeing 767-300ERs to achieve a substantial reduction in operating costs and to permit an increase in frequencies. There were to be fewer services to Africa — where the new management wanted to keep only the really profitable routes to Nigeria and Ghana — while a second daily service to New York JFK was to be launched, Dubai was to be de-linked from the Hong Kong service and Hong Kong was to be served non-stop with the new 747-400s. In addition, there were to be more flights to the Middle East making use of unused licences to serve additional destinations in the region, which BCal had obtained during the early 1980s. There was also a plan to apply for traffic rights to serve other destinations in the Far East non-stop from Gatwick in competition with BA's existing services from Heathrow. This combination of more non-stop flights and higher frequencies to prime long-haul destinations would have resulted in a more attractive product for high-yield business travellers, thereby enabling the revamped BCal to become profitable again within a short period of time.

The short-haul operation was to have brand-new aircraft as well, which would have resulted in replacing BCal's ageing BAC One-Eleven 500s with the new Boeing 737-300s Air Europe had on order. It would also have resulted in adopting the Air Europe short-haul inflight product.

BCal's senior management rejected ILG's bid. They felt that both airlines' nature of operations and their business strategies were incompatible and that therefore there were no synergies to be gained from combining BCal with what was in their opinion "essentially a charter company".

=== Other contenders ===
The October 1987 stock market crash and ILG's successful referral of the original BA-BCal merger proposal to the MMC resulted in BA tabling a revised bid to take over BCal. The fall in BA's stock value left BA's original offer worth £156.7 million and a condition of MMC approval was that BCal had to give up some routes reducing its value to BA. BA's materially inferior offer to buy out the shareholders of the British Caledonian Group led to BCal's senior management turn against BA and to recommend to their shareholders not to accept the revised bid. Instead, with the backing of BCal's controlling shareholder 3i, a desperate search for a "white knight", who was prepared to pay the same amount of money BA had offered to pay in its original bid, began.

Talks with British Midland, UTA and SAS ensued. Among these sets of talks the one with SAS seemed to be the most promising.

Had parallel talks to merge with UTA, at the time the largest wholly private airline in France and the closest French equivalent to a "Second Force", succeeded, this would have resulted in a near perfect fit of both airlines' long-haul networks as these were largely complementary. It would also have given UTA, an exclusively long-haul carrier at the time, access to BCal's short-haul network. This could have delivered additional passengers transferring at UTA's Paris Charles de Gaulle base between that airline's long-haul services and BCal's short-haul feeder flights from/to London Gatwick. However, at the time the French authorities were thought to disapprove of establishing a shareholding relationship between any of their airlines and a foreign carrier.

Parallel talks with British Midland, which wanted to transfer all of BCal's scheduled services from Gatwick to Heathrow, ended without result at an early stage because BCal's senior management felt that this was not feasible given the tight slot situation at London's premier airport.

BCal maintained that it had held several rounds of exploratory talks concerning the airline's potential takeover with a number of US carriers that were willing to pay a substantial premium over BA's original bid to acquire BCal. These talks had come to nothing because the US carriers feared that there were insurmountable regulatory obstacles to such a cross-border acquisition in the highly regulated airline industry.

=== SAS's emergence as a potential "white knight" ===
SAS was prepared to offer £110 million for 26% of the British Caledonian Group's stock, valuing the entire group at £400 million. Jan Carlzon, the then chairman of the SAS group, was well aware that so-called "nationality clauses" in most bilateral air services agreements and most countries' legal framework regulating the ownership of their airlines would restrict SAS's direct involvement in BCal's finances to acquiring a minority stake in its holding company. SAS therefore dispatched a team of executives headed by Jan Carlzon to the UK to work out details of a joint bid. This envisaged setting up an employee trust fund that would hold the same percentage of British Caledonian Group stock on behalf of the group's employees as SAS itself was seeking to acquire, so as to be compliant with any rules limiting the stakes foreign individuals or entities could own in a British airline. They were prepared to extend a loan to the trustees of the envisaged employee trust fund to enable them to acquire an equal number of shares on the employees' behalf. Goldman Sachs, the investment bank that worked on SAS's bid for 26% of the British Caledonian Group's common stock, proposed this to be structured as a so-called "exploding share". This would have enabled SAS to increase its holding in British Caledonian Group plc to a maximum of 40% through subsequent acquisition of additional non-voting shares. These in turn would have become ordinary shares following greater market liberalisation. The SAS executives discussed these ideas with BCal's senior management and the unions representing its staff at the British Caledonian Group's Crawley headquarters as well as with Government officials in London.

SAS faced a barrage of hostile propaganda and delaying tactics from BA that were designed to stall any third party's competing bid to acquire BCal for as long as possible and got a mixed response to its planned counter bid for BCal from various departments of the UK Government.

To counter these negative sentiments, SAS's proposals also included a plan to offer Dan-Air to participate in its merger with BCal by merging its scheduled services division with the new airline combine's scheduled operation, thereby strengthening its position at Gatwick and the airport as a hub.

SAS's rationale for launching a counter bid for BCal was the airline's desire not to be left behind in the then widely expected scramble for consolidation in the airline industry by becoming part of one of the four or five global airline groupings that were predicted to dominate the entire industry.

SAS thought that BCal's Gatwick base would give it access to a centrally located hub in the world's biggest international air travel market, thereby helping it to overcome its geographic isolation on the margins of Northern Europe. It also thought that BCal's lucrative long-haul routes from Gatwick to Africa and the Middle East would give it access to markets it could not profitably serve itself from relatively sparsely populated Scandinavia, and that this would make a good fit with its short-haul European routes — especially its comprehensive schedule to the UK from Scandinavia. SAS furthermore thought that by agreeing to transfer these services from Heathrow to Gatwick, it could also help solve BCal's long-standing problem of not operating enough short-haul flights to improve its long-haul loads from Gatwick.

=== Takeover by British Airways ===
On 11 December, the CAA told SAS that it needed a British investor to match the SAS bid or the CAA would recommend to the Department of Trade and Industry that BCal no longer qualified as a British airline and the trade secretary indicated to the House of Commons that in that case he would be likely to revoke BCal's licences.

To counter SAS proposals, BA made an alternative cash offer of £200 million for all of BCal's stock (equivalent to 972 pence per share) while also leaving the alternative of 80 million BA shares still open.

Faced with the prospect of its takeover target being snatched away from under its nose by SAS, British Airways initially began resorting to bullying tactics. In this it had the implicit backing of Lord Tebbit, then a prominent cabinet member of Britain's ruling Conservative Party, who publicly referred to SAS as "Viking raiders".

BA was using a mix of rational and emotive arguments to convince both the regulators and the shareholders of the British Caledonian Group that its revised offer was in their best, long-term interest.

At the time, SAS used to pursue a high-fares-high-yield strategy in its Danish, Norwegian and Swedish home markets. BA argued that the SAS bid for BCal would lead to higher fares and thus would not benefit British consumers. In addition, BA also argued that BCal's takeover by SAS, in which the governments of Denmark, Norway and Sweden jointly held a 50% stake (Note: through each government's 50% ownership of its respective national carrier, each of which held the actual traffic rights that formed the legal basis of SAS's domestic, regional and international operations) at that time, effectively represented a back-door nationalisation of a significant part of Britain's privatised air transport industry and contrasted this with its own, recent privatisation. In this context, BA highlighted that two of these governments represented countries — Norway and Sweden — that were not even members of the European Economic Community (EEC) at that time and therefore were not bound by moves to liberalise its member states' air transport markets. BA furthermore argued that this would call into question BCal's international traffic rights as most bilateral air services agreements contained a clause demanding airlines to be substantially owned and controlled by interests based in the countries they represented, and went on to argue that this could force the British Government to make concessions to its overseas counterparts that were not in the interest of the British air transport industry to preserve BCal's UK flag carrier status. BA moreover backed up its arguments with the threat that it would immediately apply to the CAA to have all of BCal's licences to operate scheduled air services revoked. BA based these threats on a clause in the 1982 Civil Aviation Act, which states that any airline claiming UK flag carrier status must be substantially owned and controlled by individuals who are UK nationals or entities whose headquarters are located in the UK.

In the event, the British Caledonian Group's controlling shareholder 3i decided to accept BA's final £250 million offer which it presented on 21 December 1987 with the proviso that it needed to be accepted or rejected that day. As the uncertainty surrounding BCal's future led to a further, significant deterioration of its financial position (Note: resulting in a £32 million loss prior to being taken over by BA) and BA's final bid trumped SAS, the fiduciary responsibilities of the British Caledonian Group's board towards their shareholders meant that the only option left was to recommend the acceptance of the BA bid. 3i and the other shareholders decided to sell their stakes in British Caledonian Group plc to British Airways relinquishing control of BCal.

Following BA's successful takeover of BCal, SAS had a giant hoarding erected at the entrance to Heathrow's central area featuring an advertisement that ended with BCal's famous 1980s marketing slogan we never forget you have a choice.

The referral of BA's original bid to take over the entire British Caledonian Group to the MMC had resulted in the imposition of several conditions before the proposed deal was allowed to go ahead. These included BA releasing a minimum of 5,000 annual slots BCal had held at Gatwick (Note: at the time, BCal held just under one-fifth of all Gatwick slots) to competitors and requiring it to surrender to the CAA several of BCal's licences to operate scheduled services from Gatwick on a number of important, short-haul feeder routes. Although BA had been permitted to re-apply for these licences, the CAA decided to re-allocate all of them to rival airlines.

BA also needed to withdraw the objections to Air Europe's application to the CAA for licences to launch new scheduled services on several short-haul routes BCal already used to serve from Gatwick. (Note: BCal had lodged these with the CAA at the time Air Europe had submitted its application)

Furthermore, both companies' combined turnover exceeded the minimum threshold that automatically triggers the referral of a proposed merger between two or more companies that conduct a significant part or all of their business in EU member states to the European competition authorities in Brussels. Therefore, the Competition Directorate of the European Commission (EC) needed to clear BA's takeover of BCal as well.

In addition to the conditions imposed by the MMC, BA agreed further concessions with the EC's Competition Directorate to prevent BA from abusing its dominant position at both of London's main airports. These included limiting BA's presence at Gatwick to a maximum of 25% of all available slots, relinquishing BCal's unused route licences and to not oppose Air Europe's designation as an additional UK flag carrier on Gatwick—Rome. BA also had to give a legally binding undertaking that it would not seek to increase its share of Gatwick slots above 25% through any additional acquisitions of other airlines and/or their slots until 1992. These measures were primarily intended as safeguards for other airlines that required access to a sufficient number of attractive slots at Gatwick to launch viable scheduled services in competition with BA. Otherwise, BA's dominant position at both of London's main airports would have made it virtually impossible for the much smaller independents to replace and enhance capacity lost as a result of BCal's takeover, especially on routes where BCal had competed with BA and which accounted for more than half of its net revenue earned from scheduled services.

Air UK was awarded the licences for BCal's former London—Scotland trunk routes from Gatwick to Glasgow and Edinburgh. Dan-Air obtained the licences for the old BCal routes from Gatwick to Manchester and Aberdeen (Note: via Manchester) as well as from Gatwick to Paris Charles de Gaulle and Nice. The licence for BCal's Gatwick—Brussels route was transferred to Air Europe. The CAA also granted Air Europe permission to increase the frequency on its existing route between Gatwick and Paris Charles de Gaulle, where it had already competed with BCal, so that it could match Dan-Air's frequency. Both Air Europe and Connectair were successful in their applications for BCal's unused European route licences.

BA continued serving the routes until the new licence holders were ready to assume operations at the start of the 1988/89 winter timetable period.

BCal ceased to exist as a legal entity at 00.01 hrs. on 14 April 1988.

Cal Air International, (Note: when the Rank Organisation gained full control of Cal Air on 25 May 1988, its name changed to Novair International Airways, followed by the replacement of BCal's lion rampant with a shooting star logo on the aircraft's tails) the former British Caledonian Charter operation, and British Caledonian Flight Training were not included in BA's acquisition of the British Caledonian Group.

British Airtours, BA's wholly owned, Gatwick-based charter subsidiary, was rebranded Caledonian Airways. The aircraft were repainted in a variation of BA livery with BCal's lion rampant on the aircraft fins and cabin crew members taking to wearing the tartan.

BA replaced the former BCal short-haul fleet of 13 BAC One-Eleven 500s with 14 Boeing 737-200 Advanced. (Note: some of these aircraft had originally been operated by British Airtours in a high-density, single-class configuration and had subsequently been re-fitted with a two-class, scheduled interior)

The One-Elevens were transferred to BA's regional bases in Birmingham and Manchester.

The five second-hand 747s BA had inherited from BCal were replaced with its own 747-100/200s. (Note: at the time, BA already had two 747s stationed at Gatwick to operate its Caribbean schedules from there)

In addition, BA stationed three Lockheed L-1011 Tristar widebodied aircraft at Gatwick, which were used to operate the former BCal West African coastal schedule as well as a number of new routes to North Africa and the Middle East that had been transferred to Gatwick from Heathrow.

The only former BCal aircraft BA kept for its Gatwick operation were eight McDonnell Douglas DC-10-30s that had formed BA's erstwhile competitor's core long-haul fleet.

BA transferred the former BCal routes to Tokyo and Saudi Arabia to Heathrow. To compensate for this loss and to utilise its full slot allocation at Gatwick, BA moved its routes to Amman, Bermuda, Cairo, Khartoum, Larnaca, Luxor and Nassau to Gatwick, and routed a new Manchester—London—Islamabad service via Gatwick instead of Heathrow. (Note: as originally planned prior to BA's takeover of BCal)

BA transferred all of its international operations from Gatwick — including those it had inherited from BCal — to the then brand-new North Terminal, (Note: the domestic services BA had inherited from BCal at Gatwick continued using the South Terminal as the North Terminal lacked the facilities to handle domestic flights in those days) which opened in March 1988.

The A320s BCal had ordered in 1983 began arriving at BA's new Gatwick base during the spring of 1988. These aircraft had been painted in BA's contemporary Landor Associates designed livery. BA operated its first commercial A320 service between London Gatwick and Geneva before transferring the entire A320 fleet to its main base at Heathrow later that year.

== Reasons for the failure of British Caledonian ==
Although BCal eventually became the UK's foremost independent, internationally-scheduled airline, a series of major financial setbacks during the mid-1980s, combined with the airline's inability to reach a viable size, put it at serious risk of collapse. In December 1987, following substantial losses, BCal was taken over by the newly privatised British Airways (BA). The prime causes of BCal's demise can be put down to four broad factors: being based at Gatwick Airport; its compromised route structure; a number of licensing hurdles; and the British Government's conflicts of interest in aviation policy.

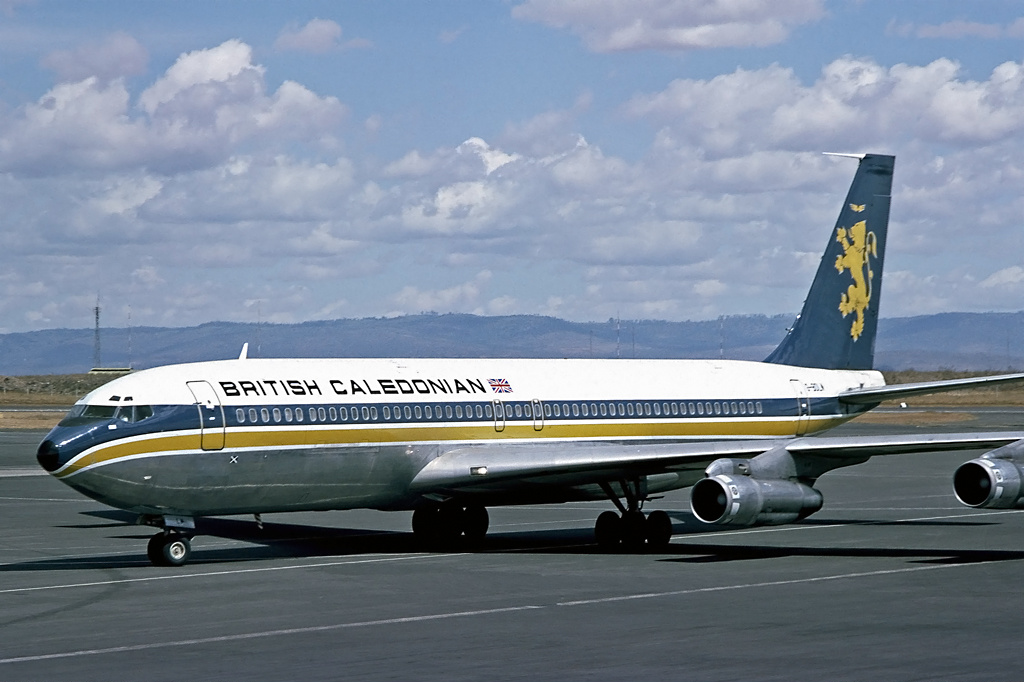
A British Caledonian Boeing 707-320C

== British Caledonian Commuter ==
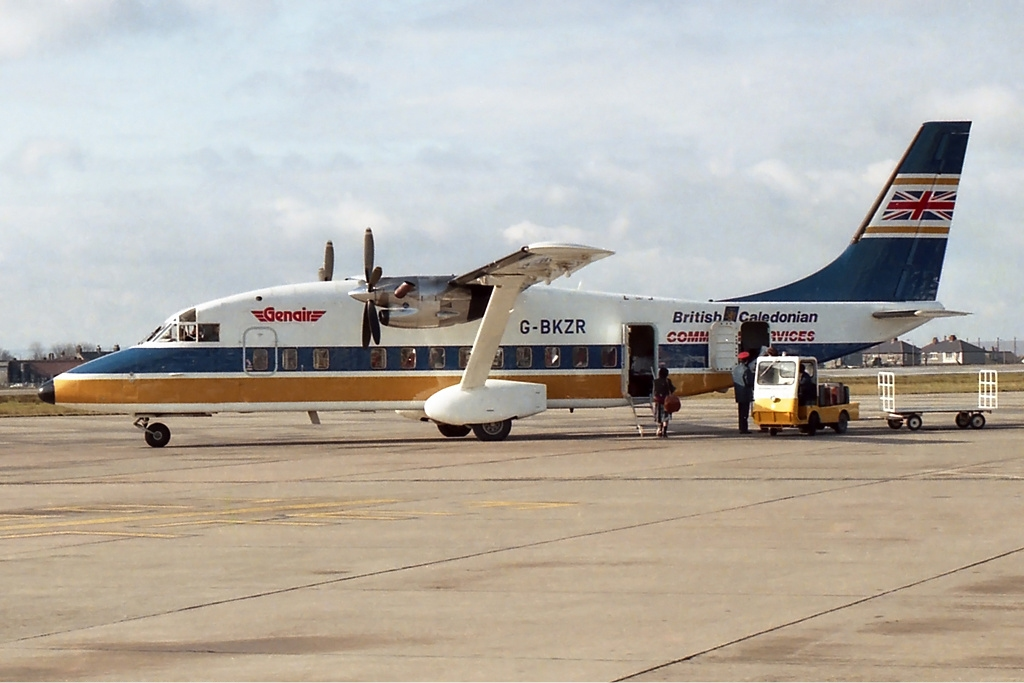
A Genair Short 360-100 in full British Caledonian Commuter livery

To further improve its network connectivity and to transform Gatwick into a US-style airline hub, BCal established a dedicated regional network under British Caledonian Commuter brand at the start of the 1982–83 winter timetable period. The network was modelled on the Allegheny Airlines commuter system, the first dedicated commuter operation in the world launched in 1967. The first airline to join British Caledonian Commuter in 1982 was Genair. Other airlines that joined British Caledonian Commuter at its inception included Brymon Airways and Guernsey Airlines.

- Genair participation in the British Caledonian Commuter started in Autumn 1982. The association stopped in June 1984, when the company suddenly ceased operations.
- Brymon Airways which operated the feeder routes from Gatwick to Birmingham, East Midlands and Plymouth. Participation lasted until 1986.
- Guernsey Airlines The CAA had transferred Air UK's Gatwick—Guernsey licence following numerous passenger complaints about the service Air UK had previously provided since it had assumed the former BIA operation on that route. Participation lasted from 1982 until 1986.
- Air Ecosse until 1986.
- British Air Ferries, with flights towards Rotterdam branded Tulip Express, until 1986.
- Connectair from 30 May 1984 until 1986.
- Jersey European Airways from the summer of 1984.
- Metropolitan Airways from 1984 until September 1985.

Two foreign companies also joined the British Caledonian initiative:

- NLM (Netherlands) for routes to London Gatwick airport only.
- RFG (Germany) from 1985 until 1986, for the Paderborn-London Gatwick airport route only.

== Fleet ==
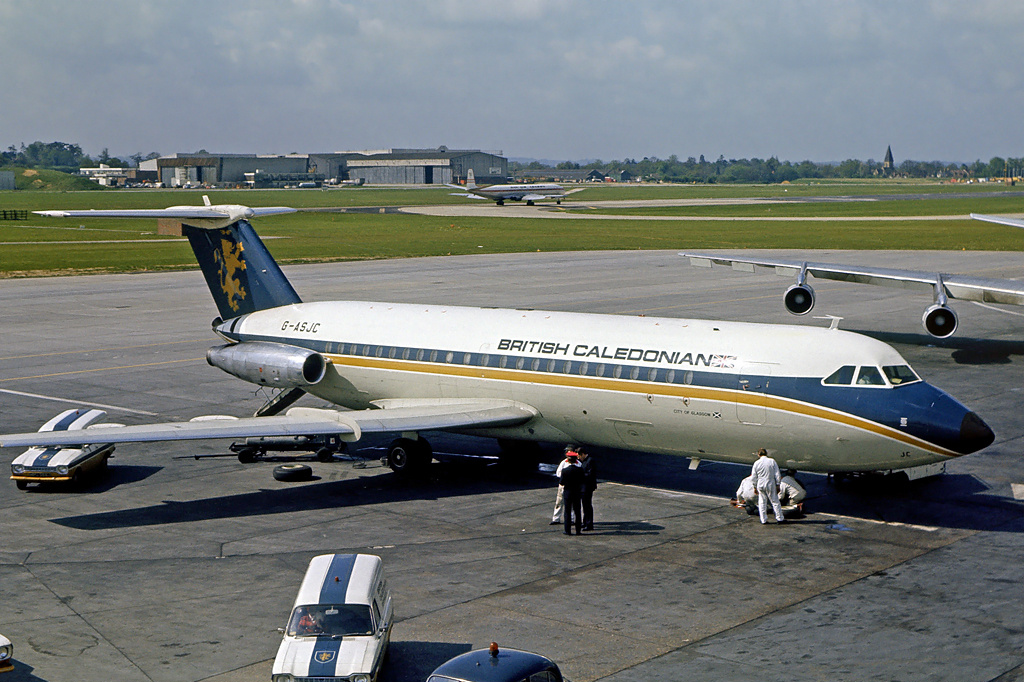
British Caledonian BAC One-Eleven 200, 1973

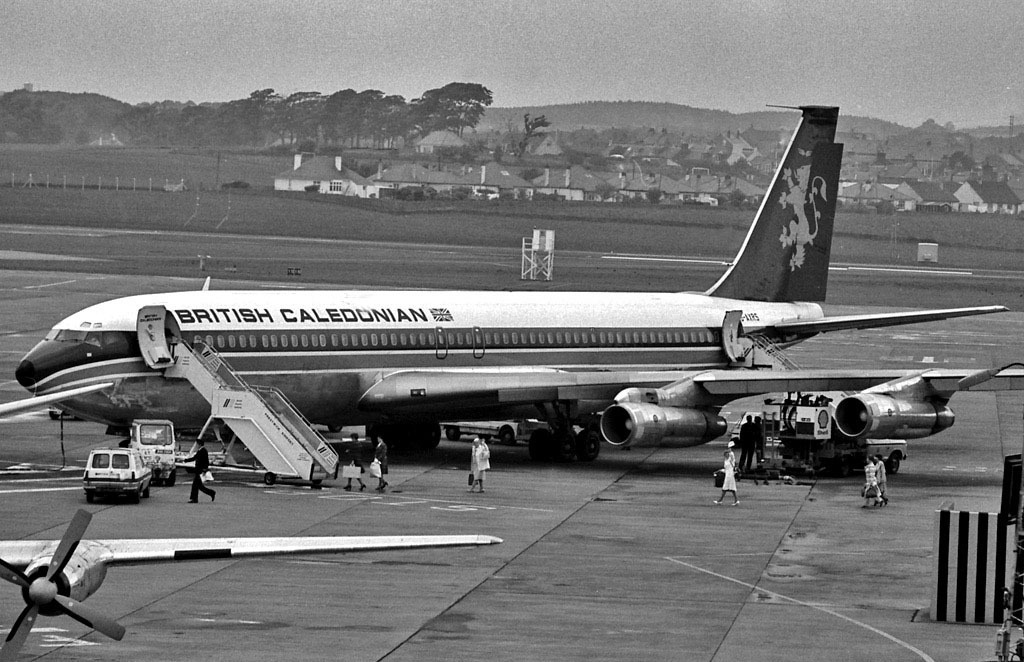
British Caledonian Boeing 707-320C at Prestwick Airport, circa 1972

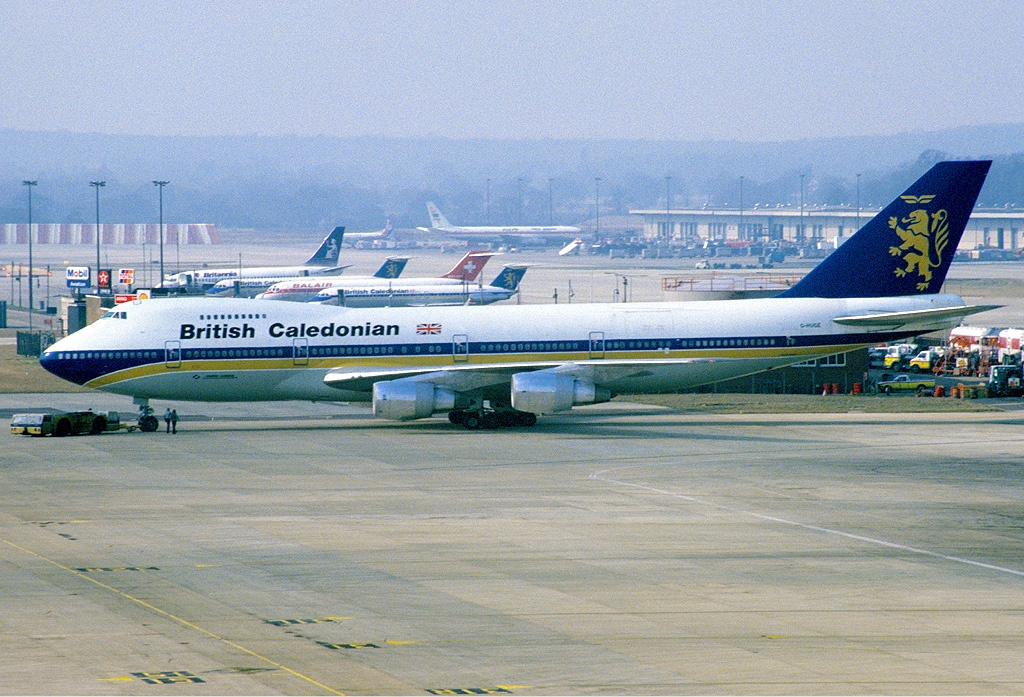
British Caledonian Boeing 747-200M, 1986

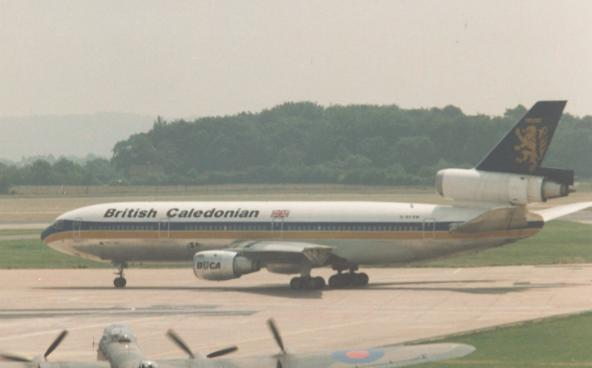
British Caledonian McDonnell Douglas DC-10-30, 1987

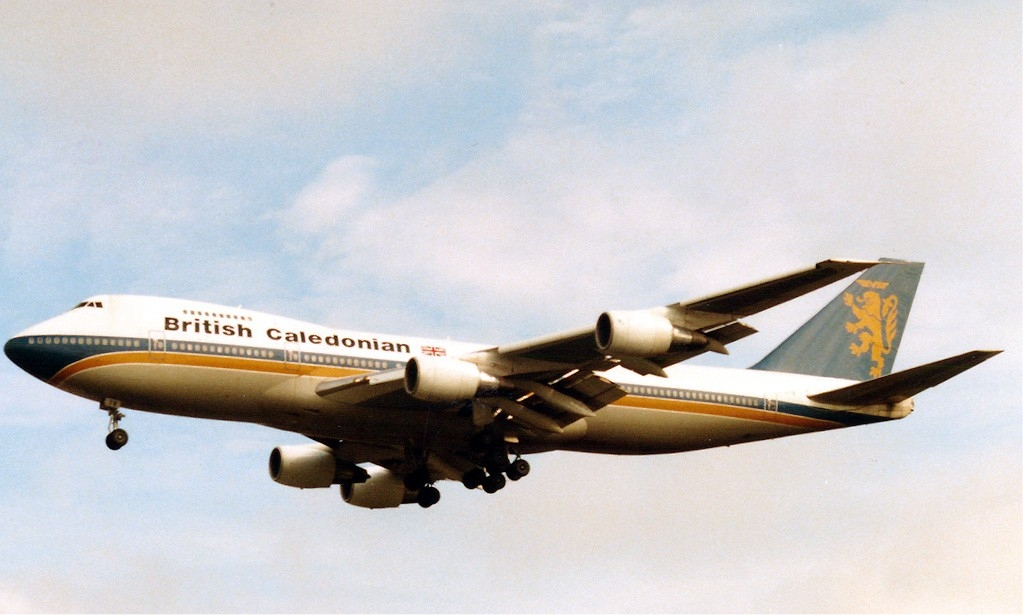
ABritish Caledonian Boeing 747-200, 1988

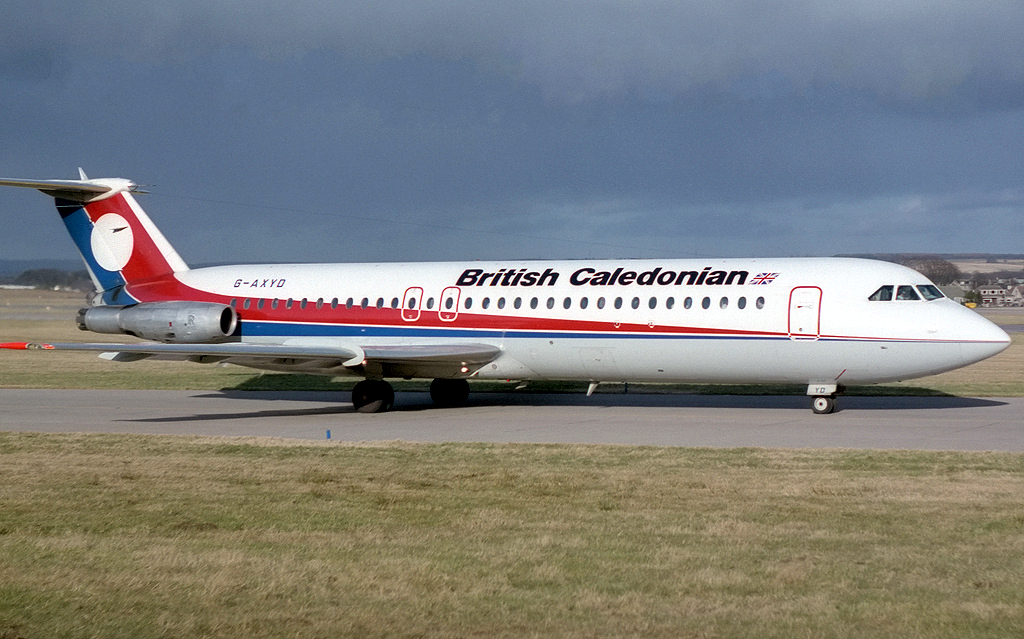
British Caledonian Airways BAC 111 in Dan Air London livery

BCal and its subsidiaries operated the following fixed wing aircraft types:

- Airbus A310-200
- BAC One-Eleven 200/300/400/500 series
- Boeing 707-120B/320B/320C
- Boeing 747-100/200B/200B "Combi"
- McDonnell Douglas DC-10-10/30
- Piper PA-23 Aztec
- Piper PA-31 Navajo Chieftain
- Vickers VC10 1103/1109 series
- Vickers Viscount 800 series

Aircraft	Number
Boeing 707-320C	8
Vickers VC10	4
BAC One-Eleven 500	13
BAC One-Eleven 200	7
Total	32

Fleet in 1970s
Aircraft	May 1972	March 1975	April 1978
Boeing 707-320C	8	11	9
Vickers VC10	4		
BAC One-Eleven 500	13	6	9
BAC One-Eleven 200	7	7	7
McDonnell Douglas DC-10-30			2 plus 2 on order
Piper PA-31 Navajo Chieftain			2
Total	32	24	29

5,300 people were employed in May 1972. 4,846 people in 1975. rising to 5,500 people in April 1978.

Fleet in 1981

In May 1981 BCal's fleet comprised 29 jet aircraft.

Aircraft	Number
McDonnell Douglas DC-10-30	8
Boeing 707-320C	5
BAC One-Eleven 500	9
BAC One-Eleven 200	7
Total	29

6,600 people were employed.

Fleet in 1984

In March 1984 BCal's mainline fleet comprised 25 jet aircraft.

Aircraft	Number
Boeing 747-200B	1
McDonnell Douglas DC-10-30	8
Airbus A310-200	2
Boeing 707-320C	2
BAC One-Eleven 500	12
Total	25

6,300 people were employed.

Fleet in 1986

In March 1986 BCal's mainline fleet comprised 27 jet aircraft with seven Airbus A320 on order. BCal employed 6,750 staff.

Aircraft	Number
Boeing 747-200B	1
Boeing 747-200M	1
McDonnell Douglas DC-10-30	10
Airbus A310-200	3
BAC One-Eleven 500	13
Total	28

== Incidents and accidents ==
BCal aircraft were never involved in fatal accidents during its 17-year existence. There were a few noteworthy non-fatal incidents involving the airline's aircraft.

- On 24 September 1971, a Vickers VC10 1103 (registration: G-ASIX) was hit by clear air turbulence (CAT) over the Andes mountain range en route from to Buenos Aires to Santiago de Chile. The aircraft was thrown up on to its side at a greater-than-90-degree angle, down to 28,000 ft then up to 35,000 and then tossed, headlong, nose down, towards the peaks just a few thousand feet (several hundred metres) below. Several powered control units (PCUs) of almost every flight control surface were knocked out leaving the aircraft to plummet downwards at a speed approaching Mach 1. The crew managed a successful recovery and reset the aircraft's PCUs. Following a safe landing at Santiago, a thorough ground check was performed before the aircraft was allowed to make the return flight - via Freetown - to Gatwick during which severe vibration manifested. A detailed inspection of the aircraft at Gatwick revealed a fracture in one of the tail fin support spars, and the torsion box had distorted leaving the wingtips four feet higher than normal. On an airliner with wing-mounted engines under the same circumstances, the engine mounting pins would probably have snapped. An air hostess who was working in the rear galley was injured in the incident.
- On 28 January 1972, a Vickers VC10-1109 (registration: G-ARTA) sustained severe structural damage to the fuselage as a result of an exceptionally hard landing at Gatwick at the end of a short ferry flight from Heathrow. The airline decided that repairs were not cost-effective and the aircraft was written off and scrapped at Gatwick in 1975.).
- On 19 July 1972, a BAC One-Eleven 501EX (registration: G-AWYS) sustained substantial damage as a result of aborting takeoff from Corfu Airport too late. The aircraft had passed through a pool of standing water close to its decision speed during the takeoff run. This caused a temporary reduction of engine thrust which the flight's commander interpreted as engine failure requiring an immediate rejection of takeoff. The decision to abandon their takeoff was delayed and as a result, the aircraft did not stop on the runway but, after crossing some rough ground, finally came to rest in a 1 m (3.3 ft)-deep lagoon. None of the six crew members and 79 passengers was seriously injured in the crash, but an elderly female passenger collapsed after being helped from the aircraft and subsequently died of cardiac arrest on her way to hospital.

== See also ==
- List of defunct airlines of the United Kingdom
