= A4E =

A4E may refer to:

- A4e, formerly Action for Employment, a defunct British welfare-to-work company
- Airlines for Europe, a trade association of European airlines
