= European Low Fares Airline Association =

European trade association

Coordinates: 50.8403°N 4.3668°E

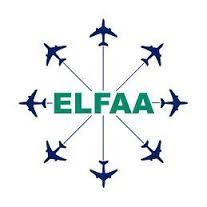
- Launch date: 2003
- Disbanded: 2016
- Annual passengers (M): 236.3 million (2014)
- Website: elfaa.com

The European Low Fares Airline Association (ELFAA) was an organization formed in 2004 to represent low-cost carriers and lobby European institutions on their behalf. It ceased operations and disbanded in 2016, as major members joined the newly formed trade group Airlines for Europe. ELFAA was based in Brussels, Belgium.

== Membership ==
Before stopping operations in 2016, ELFAA had ten members: British Airways, Iberia, EasyJet, Jet2.com, Iberia Express, Norwegian Air Shuttle, Ryanair, Volotea, Vueling, and Wizz Air. BA and Iberia joined in 2015, citing similar views regarding air transport liberalisation and position regarding major Middle East airlines.

Former members include Air Polonia (ceased operations on 5 December 2004), Bmibaby (ceased operations on 9 September 2012), Flying Finn (ceased operations on 27 January 2004), My Way Airlines, later MyAir.com (ceased operations on 24 July 2009), SkyEurope (ceased operations on 1 September 2009), Sterling (ceased operations on 29 October 2008), Volareweb.com (ceased operations on 12 January 2009), Basiqair (merged into Transavia on 1 January 2005), Clickair (merged into Vueling on 15 July 2009), Hapag-Lloyd Express, later TUIfly (merged into TUIfly in January 2007), and Blue Air.

== See also ==
- Association of European Airlines (AEA)
- Airlines for Europe (A4E)
