= Association of European Airlines =

International airline trade body

- Formation: 1952
- Dissolved: 2016
- Type: Airline trade association
- Headquarters: Brussels
- Location: Europe
- Members: 25 airlines
- President: Temel Kotil
- Website: www.aea.be

The Association of European Airlines (AEA) was a trade body that brought together 22 major airlines, and was the voice of the European airline industry for over 60 years. It shut down in the end of 2016.

AEA worked in partnership with the institutions of the European Union and other stakeholders in the value chain, to ensure the sustainable growth of the European airline industry in a global context. Upon its demise in 2016, AEA Member Airlines carried over 300 million passengers and 4.5 million tonnes of cargo and provided direct employment to 270,000 people. They operated over 8,000 flights a day, serving 530 destinations in 140 countries, with a global turnover of €100 billion.

== History ==
AEA traces its history back to 1952, when the Presidents of Air France, KLM, Sabena and Swissair formed a joint study group, shortly afterwards expanded with the addition of BEA (a forerunner of British Airways) and SAS. In February 1954, the Air Research Bureau (ARB) was established on a permanent basis, in Brussels. The name was subsequently changed to the European Airlines Research Bureau and – in 1973 – the AEA.

Shortly after the ARB was established, the 1954 Strasbourg Conference on the Coordination of Transport in Europe led to the foundation of ECAC and recommended that participating states encourage air carriers to undertake cooperative studies aimed at promoting an orderly development of air transport in Europe. Evidently, the AEA was well placed to be the industry's representative in dialogue with ECAC.

By the time the AEA name was adopted, membership had grown to 19. There were three standing committees: Research and Planning, Airline Industry Affairs, and Technical Affairs, which was formed when a pre-existing industry body (the "Montparnasse Committee") was absorbed into AEA.

The next major change took place in 1983 when the (then) Commercial and Aeropolitical Committee was divided, in recognition of the growing involvement of the EU in air transport matters. This involvement was formalised in 1986 when air transport was confirmed as being subject to the single-market process.

In the mid-1980s, the Association acquired permanent groups in the fiscal, security and in-flight services fields. To these was added, in 1991, an Infrastructure Group. Another overhaul occurred in 1994, with the establishment of five standing committees, including Infrastructure & Environment and Social Affairs. Research & Information and legal matters acquired the status of support functions.

In 2002, the AEA Presidents determined that the AEA should become an organisation which provides an industry platform for its members in the EU policy-making environment. To achieve this end, the statutes were amended. One major change was that the Presidents would set annual objectives for the Association. The Presidents’ Committee, enlarged by two additional members to twelve, was given the additional task of monitoring the progress of the association in achieving the set objectives. Furthermore, the Presidents modified the criteria for entry and exit into the association to reflect recent market developments. These far-reaching amendments to the statutes were formally approved in May 2003.

International Airlines Group companies British Airways and Iberia, as well as Air Berlin announced their departure from the group in April 2015. While Air Berlin has already been a member there, British Airways and Iberia shortly later joined the European Low Fares Airline Association (ELFAA), more inline with its view of the liberalisation of the air transport, notably towards gulf carriers. Alitalia also left the AEA in May 2015 for the same reason. All of these airlines already maintain notable partnerships with gulf carriers.

At its shutdown in 2016, AEA had 22 members, the Presidents' Committee was presided by Temel Kotil PhD, CEO of Turkish Airlines. CEO of the Association of European Airlines was Mr Athar Husain Khan.

== Former members ==
As of January 2016, members of the AEA were:

- Aegean Airlines ^{SA}
- airBaltic
- Air France ^{ST}
- Air Malta
- Austrian Airlines ^{SA}
- Brussels Airlines ^{SA}
- Cargolux
- Croatia Airlines ^{SA}
- DHL Aviation
- Finnair ^{OW}
- Icelandair
- KLM ^{ST}
- LOT Polish Airlines ^{SA}
- Lufthansa ^{SA}
- Luxair
- Scandinavian Airlines ^{SA}
- Swiss International Air Lines ^{SA}
- TAP Portugal ^{SA}
- TAROM ^{ST}
- TNT Airways
- Turkish Airlines ^{SA}
- Ukraine International Airlines

(^{OW}: Oneworld member; ^{ST}: SkyTeam member; ^{SA}: Star Alliance member.)

== See also ==
- Airlines for Europe (A4E)
