= Airlines for Europe =

Trade association of European airlines

- Launch date: 2016
- Full members: 16
- Annual passengers (M): 720 (2019)
- Fleet size: 3000+
- Headquarters: Brussels, Belgium
- Management: Ourania Georgoutsakou (Managing Director)
- Website: a4e.eu

Airlines for Europe (A4E) is the largest EU airline association, representing 70% of European air traffic.

== History ==
A4E was founded in January 2016 by Europe's five largest carriers: Air France–KLM Group, easyJet, International Airlines Group, Lufthansa Group and Ryanair Holdings and serves as a lobbying group for European commercial airlines in Brussels.

A4E currently counts 16 leading airline groups as its members. New carriers both big and small, from low-cost to leaser, legacy and cargo have joined A4E. Beyond airlines, global manufacturers such as Airbus, Boeing, Embraer, GE, and Thales are also members of A4E.

== Objectives ==
The main goal of this association is to address key policy issues affecting passengers and cargo while promoting long-term solutions to benefit Europe's aviation sector, including:

- Improving European airspace efficiency and securing a Single European Sky.
- Revising Europe's Air Passenger Rights legislation.
- Improving safety and security measures for airlines and their passengers.
- Tackling airport market power and excessive aviation taxes and charges.
- Moving towards a zero or low-carbon economy and thereby supporting efforts to achieve the objectives of the Paris Agreement.

== Members ==
=== Airline members ===
At September 2020, the following airline groups are members of A4E:

Airline group	Participating airlines
Aegean Airlines	Aegean Airlines ^{B}
AirBaltic	AirBaltic
Air France–KLM Group ^{A}	Air France ^{B} KLM ^{B} Transavia ^{B} Martinair ^{C} Air France-KLM Cargo ^{C}
Cargolux	Cargolux ^{C}
EasyJet Group ^{A}	EasyJet UK; EasyJet Europe; EasyJet Switzerland
Finnair	Finnair; Finnair Cargo ^{C}
IAG ^{A}	British Airways ^{B} Aer Lingus; Iberia ^{B} LEVEL; Vueling; IAG Cargo ^{C}
Icelandair	Icelandair
Jet2.com	Jet2
Lufthansa Group ^{A}	Lufthansa ^{B} Austrian Airlines; Brussels Airlines; Eurowings ^{B} Swiss International Air Lines ^{B} Lufthansa Cargo ^{C}
Norwegian	Norwegian Air Shuttle; Norwegian Air Sweden
Ryanair Holdings ^{A}	Ryanair; Buzz; Malta Air; Lauda; Ryanair UK
Smartwings	CSA Czech Airlines; Smartwings Hungary; Smartwings Poland; Smartwings Slovakia
TAP Air Portugal	TAP Air Portugal ^{B}
TUI Group	TUI fly Deutschland; TUI fly Belgium; TUI fly Netherlands; TUI fly Nordic; TUI Airways
Volotea	Volotea

^{A} Founding members
^{B} Including subsidiaries
^{C} Cargo fleet

=== Manufacturing members ===
There are also 5 international aircraft manufacturers who are participating in this organization.

- Airbus
- Boeing
- Embraer
- GE Aviation
- Thales Group

=== Associate members ===
- One Sky Solutions
- Rechtsanwälte
- Oracle Solicitors

== See also ==
- Association of European Airlines (AEA)
- European Low Fares Airline Association (ELFAA)
- European Regions Airline Association
