= List of McDonnell Douglas DC-10 operators =

The following is a list of all current and former airlines operating the McDonnell Douglas DC-10.

== Current ==
Airline	Country	10	15	30	30ER	40	10F	30F	30CF	40F	In service	Notes
10 Tanker	(United States)	1			4						4	KDC-10 Aerial fire fighting tanker
Cargo Three	(Panama)							1			1	Converted to MD-10-30F by FedEx
Omega Aerial Refueling Services	(United States)					1			2	2	2	All converted to KDC-10; 1 DC-10-30CF and 2 DC-10-40F stored
Orbis International	(United States)							1			1	Operated by FedEx Express; Converted to MD-10-30F
Transportes Aéreos Bolivianos	(Bolivia)						1	2			1	1 active airframe converted to MD-10-30F by FedEx

== Former ==
Airline	Country	10	15	30	30ER	40	10F	30F	30CF	40F	Notes
Aerocancun	(Mexico)		1								Transferred to Sun Country Airlines
Aeroflot	(Russia)								1	4	
Aeroperú	(Peru)		3	1							DC-10-15 leased from Mexicana de Aviacion; DC-10-30 leased from Canadian Airlines
AeroLyon	(France)			3							
Aeromexico	(Mexico)		2	4							
Aerowings	(Antigua and Barbuda)		1								Leased from Skyjet
AfricaOne	(Uganda)			1							
African Safari Airways	(Kenya)			2							
Air Afrique	(Ivory Coast)		1	3							
Air Algérie	(Algeria)	2									
Air Europe	(Italy)			1							Leased from ChallengAir
Air Florida	(United States)								5		Leased from Transamerica Airlines, Flying Tiger Line and World Airways
Air France	(France)			5							
Air Hawaii	(United States)	2									
Air Lib	(France)			11	1						Ceased operations in 2003
Air Liberté	(France)			5							Renamed to Air Lib in 2001
Air Martinique	(Martinique)			1							
Air New Zealand	(New Zealand)			8							
Air Panamá Internacional	(Panama)	1				2					DC-10-40 leased from Jet 24
Air Pacific	(Fiji)			1							
Air Siam	(Thailand)			1							
Air Tchad	(Chad)			2							
Air Zaïre	(Zaire)			2							
Airtours International Airways	(United Kingdom)	3		1							
Alitalia	(Italy)			8							
Aloha Airlines	(United States)			1							
American Airlines	(United States)	55		11							
American Trans Air	(United States)	1		4		1					
AOM French Airlines	(France)			15							Merged into Air Liberté in 2001
Ariana Afghan Airlines	(Afghanistan)			1							
Arrow Air	(United States)	5					2	3	1	2	Ceased operations in 2010
Astra Airlines	(Switzerland)		1								Leased from Skyjet
Austrian Airlines	(Austria)				3						
Avcom Aviation	(Russia)							1			
Avensa	(Venezuela)			3							
Avient Aviation	(Zimbabwe)							2	1		
Balair	(Switzerland)			1							
Birgenair	(Turkey)			1							Leased from Finnair
Biman Bangladesh Airlines	(Bangladesh)			5	1						
Boğaziçi Hava Taşımacılığı	(Turkey)	2									
Brasmex – Brasil Minas Express	(Brazil)							1			Ceased operations in 2004
British Airways	(United Kingdom)			8							
British Caledonian	(United Kingdom)			10							
British Caledonian Charter	(United Kingdom)	2									Rebranded as Cal Air International in 1985
Cal Air International	(United Kingdom)	3									Renamed to Novair International Airways in 1988
Caledonian Airways	(United Kingdom)			7							
Cameroon Airlines	(Cameroon)		1								Leased from Skyjet
Canadian Airlines	(Canada)	3		9	5						
Canadian Pacific Airlines	(Canada)	4		10							
Capitol Air	(United States)	5									
Cargoitalia	(Italy)							1			
CargoLion	(Luxembourg)							1			
ChallengAir	(Belgium)			2				1			
Cielos Airlines	(Peru)						1	7	2		Ceased operations in 2012
Condor	(Germany)			5							
Continental Airlines	(United States)	8		31				8			
Continental Micronesia	(Guam)	5		1							
Corsair International	(France)			2							Leased from ChallengAir
DAS Air Cargo	(Uganda)							9			
Delta Air Lines	(United States)	15									
DETA Air	(Kazakhstan)									2	
Dominicana de Aviación	(Dominican Republic)	1		1		1					DC-10-10 leased from Arrow Air; DC-10-30 leased from TAESA Lineas Aéreas; DC-10-40 leased from Jet 24
Eastern Air Lines	(United States)			3							Transferred to Continental Airlines
Ecuatoriana de Aviación	(Ecuador)			3							
El Al	(Israel)		1								
Electra Airlines	(Greece)		2					1			
Emery Worldwide Airlines	(United States)						5	3			
Ethiopian Airlines	(Ethiopia)							2			
European Airlift	(Belgium)	1		1							
Excalibur Airways	(United Kingdom)			1							
Express One International	(United States)			3							
FedEx Express	(United States)						89	24			Largest DC-10 freighter operator 64 converted to MD-10-10F; 18 converted to MD-10-30F
Finnair	(Finland)			4	1						
Garuda Indonesia	(Indonesia)	1		21				6			DC-10-10 leased from Key Airlines
Gemini Air Cargo	(United States)							12			Ceased operations in 2010
Ghana Airways	(Ghana)			7							
Harlequin Air	(Japan)			1							Leased from Japan Air System
Hawaiian Airlines	(United States)	20		5							DC-10-10 leased from American Airlines
Iberia	(Spain)			12							
Icelandic Airlines	(Iceland)							1			Leased from Seaboard World Airlines
Jat Airways	(Socialist Federal Republic of Yugoslavia)			5					2		
JALways	(Japan)					3					
Japan Airlines	(Japan)					20					
Japan Air Charter	(Japan)					4					
Japan Air System	(Japan)			2							
Japan Asia Airways	(Japan)					7					Transferred to Japan Airlines
Jet 24	(United States)					2					
JMC Airlines	(United Kingdom)			2							
Kenya Airways	(Kenya)			1							
Key Airlines	(United States)			1							
KF Cargo	(Canada)							4			
KLM	(Netherlands)			10				1			DC-10-30CF leased from Martinair
Korean Air	(South Korea)			5				1			
Kras Air	(Russia)			2							
Kuwait Airways	(Kuwait)			1							Leased from British Airways
Laker Airways	(United Kingdom)	6		5							
Laker Airways (USA)	(United States)	1		3							
LAN-Chile	(Chile)			5							Leased from Pan Am, Air New Zealand, and Laker Airways
LAM - Mozambique Airlines	(Mozambique)			1							
Leisure Air	(United States)	2		3							
Líneas Aéreas Paraguayas	(Paraguay)			3							
LOT Polish Airlines	(Poland)			3							
Lufthansa	(Germany)			12				1			
Malaysia Airlines	(Malaysia)	3		14				7			
Mandala Airlines	(Indonesia)							1			Leased from Martinair
Martinair	(Netherlands)			1				4			
Master Top Airlines	(Brazil)							3			Ceased operations in 2011
Mexicana de Aviación	(Mexico)	2	5								
Minerve	(France)			3							
Monarch Airlines	(United Kingdom)			1							
MyTravel Airways	(United Kingdom)	3		1							
National Airlines	(United States)	11		5							Merged into Pan Am in 1980
Nigeria Airways	(Nigeria)	1	1	5					1		DC-10-10 leased from Turkish Airlines; DC-10-30CF leased from Transamerica Airlines
Norse Atlantic Airways	(Norway)		1								
Northwest Airlines	(United States)			21	3	22					
Novair International Airways	(United Kingdom)	3									Ceased operations in 1990
Okada Air	(Nigeria)			1							
Omni Air International	(United States)	3		11	4			2			
Overseas National Airways	(United States)								5		
Pacific East Air	(United States)	1									
Pakistan International Airlines	(Pakistan)			5							
Pan Am	(United States)	11		5							
Philippine Airlines	(Philippines)			5				1			
PLUNA	(Uruguay)			2							
Premiair	(Denmark)	4		1							
Qantas	(Australia)								1		Leased from Martinair
Sabena	(Belgium)			7				6			
Santa Barbara Airlines	(Venezuela)			2							
Saudi Arabian Airlines	(Saudi Arabia)		1								Leased from Skyjet
Scanair	(Sweden)	6		1							
Scandinavian Airlines	(Sweden)			12							
Scibe Airlift	(Zaire)	1		1							
Shabair	(Zaire)	1		2							
STAF Airlines	(Argentina)							1			Leased from TAESA Lineas Aéreas
Singapore Airlines	(Singapore)			6				1			
Skyjet	(Antigua and Barbuda)		3	2				1			Ceased operations in 2001
Skyjet Brasil	(Brazil)			1							
Skyservice USA	(United States)	2									
Sobelair	(Belgium)			1							Leased from Skyjet
Solar Cargo	(Venezuela)							1			
Spantax	(Spain)	2		1				2			
Sudan Airways	(Sudan)			1							
Sun Country Airlines	(United States)	6	4			1		1			
Swissair	(Switzerland)			10	4						
TAESA Lineas Aéreas	(Mexico)			2					1		
Taino Airlines	(Dominican Republic)			1							Leased from Scibe Airlift
TAROM	(Romania)			1							Leased from ChallengAir
Thai Airways International	(Thailand)			6	3						
The Hawaii Express	(United States)	2									Ceased operations in 1983
Transaero	(Russia)			3							
Trans International Airlines	(United States)							3			
Transmile Air Services	(Malaysia)			2							Leased from Laker Airways
Tunisair	(Tunisia)			1					1		DC-10-30 leased from Malaysia Airlines; DC-10-30CF leased from World Airways
Turkish Airlines	(Turkey)	3		1							
Union de Transports Aériens	(France)			7							
United Airlines	(United States)	38		4	3		1	4			
Varig	(Brazil)			15							
Varig Logística	(Brazil)							3			
VASP	(Brazil)			6				1			
Viasa	(Venezuela)			8					1		Ceased operations in 1997
Virgin Express	(Belgium)			1							Used for charter flights for summer of 1998
Wardair	(Canada)			3							
Western Airlines	(United States)	13		1							Merged into Delta Air Lines in 1987
World Airways	(United States)	11		20	1		1		4		
Zambia Airways	(Zambia)			2				1			

== Orders and deliveries ==
Orders and deliveries sortable, presorted by customer
Customer	Orders											
Customer	DC-10-10	DC-10-10CF	DC-10-15	DC-10-30	DC-10-30CF	DC-10-30ER	DC-10-30F	DC-10-40	KC-10A	Total	GE	PW
Aeromexico			2	2						4	4	
Air Afrique				3						3	3	
Air New Zealand				8						8	8	
Air Siam				1						1	1	
Air Zaïre				2						2	2	
Alitalia				8						8	8	
American Airlines	35									35	35	
Ariana Afghan Airlines				1						1	1	
Balair				1						1	1	
Biman Bangladesh Airlines				1						1	1	
British Caledonian				8						8	8	
Condor				3						3	3	
Continental Airlines	8	8		2						18	18	
CP Air				6		1				7	7	
FedEx Express							11			11	11	
Finnair				2		1				3	3	
Garuda Indonesia				6						6	6	
Ghana Airways				1						1	1	
Iberia				9						9	9	
Japan Air System				2						2	2	
Japan Airlines								20		20		20
Jat Airways				2						2	2	
KLM				11						11	11	
Korean Air				3						3	3	
Laker Airways	6			5						11	11	
Lufthansa				11						11	11	
Malaysia Airlines				3						3	3	
Martinair					4					4	4	
Mexicana de Aviación			5							5	5	
National Airlines	11			5						16	16	
Nigeria Airways				3						3	3	
Northwest Airlines								22		22		22
Overseas National Airways					4					4	4	
Pakistan International Airlines				4						4	4	
Philippine Airlines				2						2	2	
Sabena					5					5	5	
Scandinavian Airlines				5						5	5	
Seaboard World Airlines					1					1	1	
Singapore Airlines				7						7	7	
Swissair				13						13	13	
Thai Airways International				2		3				5	5	
Trans International Airlines					3					3	3	
Turkish Airlines	3									3	3	
Union de Transports Aériens				6						6	6	
United Airlines	46	1								47	47	
United States Air Force									60	60	60	
Varig				10						10	10	
Viasa				3						3	3	
Wardair				2						2	2	
Western Airlines	13									13	13	
World Airways					9					9	9	
Zambia Airways				1						1	1	
Total	122	9	7	164	26	5	11	42	60	446	404	42

== See also ==
- List of McDonnell Douglas MD-11 operators
