= List of Boeing customer codes =

Unique, fixed customer codes were used by Boeing Commercial Airplanes to denote the original customer for airframes produced as part of Boeing's 377 Stratocruiser and later 7x7 families of commercial aircraft until 2016.

== History ==
Boeing first used customer codes for the 377-10 Stratocruiser.

In 2016, Boeing announced that they would no longer apply customer codes to any aircraft produced after a certain point, which would lead to their designators being the "generic" type for the model. The codes were removed from the type certificates for each model with effect from the production line number shown below:

- Boeing 737 Next Generation: line number 6082
- Boeing P-8 Poseidon: line number 6020
- Boeing 747-8: line number 1534
- Boeing 767: line number 1102
- Boeing 777: line number 1422

Furthermore, customer codes have never been used for Boeing airplane models launched after the termination of customer codes, namely the 787, 737 MAX and 777X.

== Format ==
The codes are in the form of two letters and/or digits which are appended to the aircraft's model designator, as seen in the following examples:

- A Boeing 377-10 ordered by Pan American World Airways with customer code 26 would be designated 377-10-26. (Note: As with all Stratocruiser customer codes, 26 was reassigned to another customer (in this case the United States Air Force) with the introduction of the 7x7 family.)
- A Boeing 707-100 ordered by Qantas with customer code 38 would be designated as 707-138.
- A Boeing 717-200 ordered by Hawaiian Airlines with customer code 2A would be designated as 717-22A.
- A Boeing 727-100 and 727-200 ordered by American Airlines with customer code 23 are designated as 727-23 or 727-123 (Note: Early 727s followed the "727-XX" format (alternatively "727-0XX") as they did not have a variant suffix. With the introduction of the stretched 727-200, the original 727 was redesignated as 727-100 and all subsequent short-bodied aircraft followed the "727-1XX" format.) and 727-223, respectively.
- A Boeing 737-700 and 737-800 ordered by Southwest Airlines with customer code H4 would be designated as 737-7H4 and 737-8H4 respectively.
- A Boeing 747-200B, Boeing 747-400, Boeing 747-8I and Boeing 747-8F ordered by Korean Air with customer code B5 would be designated as, 747-2B5B, 747-4B5, 747-8B5 (not 747-8B5I) and 747-8B5(F) respectively.
- A Boeing 747SP ordered by Saudia with customer code 68 would be designated as Boeing 747SP-68 instead of 747-168(SP).
- A Boeing 747SR ordered by All Nippon Airways with customer code 81 would be designated as Boeing 747SR-81, instead of 747-181(SR).
- A Boeing 757-200 ordered by Delta Air Lines with customer code 32 would be designated as Boeing 757-232.
- A Boeing 767-300ER ordered by United Airlines with customer code 22 would be designated as Boeing 767-322(ER).
- A Boeing 777-200LR, 777-300, 777-300ER & 777F ordered by Emirates with customer code 1H would be designated as Boeing 777-21H(LR), Boeing 777-31H, Boeing 777-31H(ER) and 777-F1H (not 777-21H(F)) respectively.

The codes do not change if the aircraft is subsequently sold, such as if a passenger aircraft is owned and operated by another airline or converted into a freighter. Several examples are several 777-300s originally built for Emirates with customer code 1H and subsequently sold to Cathay Pacific are still designated at 777-31H, and a Boeing Dreamlifter that was originally built as a 747-400 passenger aircraft for China Airlines with customer code 09 subsequently sold to will be designated as 747-409(LCF) (instead of the original 747-409).

Exceptions existed, such as in some cases if an airline cancelled or sold their order before Boeing had commenced building the airframe, the customer code would be changed to that of the new purchaser. One such example is the order for sixteen 737-800s taken over by Qantas from American Airlines after the September 11 attacks in 2001 - these aircraft were delivered with Qantas' 38 code rather than 23 for American. Also, 2 747-200Bs purchased by British Airways were sold while under construction, to Malaysian Airline System and remained 747-236Bs. Another case is a situation where Boeing sells experimental aircraft to an airline, one example being the first two 777-300ERs built initially as experimental aircraft for Boeing which were subsequently sold to Japan Airlines had their codes changed from 777-300(ER) to 777-346(ER).

== List of Stratocruiser customer codes ==
Customer codes used for the 377 Stratocruiser did not carry over into the 7x7 series.

Code	Customer	Aircraft
Code	Customer	377
19	Boeing	377-10-19
26	Pan American World Airways	377-10-26; 377-10-26S; 377-28-26 (Note: Not built)
27	Transcontinental & Western Air	377-10-27
28	Scandinavian Airlines System	377-10-28
29	American Overseas Airlines	377-10-29
30	Northwest Orient Airlines	377-10-30
32	British Overseas Airways Corporation	377-10-32
34	United Air Lines	377-10-34
39	Cubana de Aviación	377-17-39

== List of 7x7 family customer codes ==
Boeing generally allocated new codes in sequence, with the exception of 00 to 19 being issued after 21 to 99. Code number 20 itself came to be reserved for Boeing's own use, though this was only ever formally the case for the 707.

- 20 to 99 - First sequence
- 00 to 19 - Second sequence
- A0 to Z9 - Third sequence
- 0A to 9Z - Fourth sequence
- AA to ZZ - Fifth and final sequence

Airlines in italics are defunct.

Please note that the list of aircraft types for each airline is only those produced with that of the airline's code, and is not intended to reflect their complete operational history.

=== First sequence ===
Code	Customer	Aircraft								
Code	Customer	707	720	717	727	737	747	757	767	777
20	Boeing	707-320C (Note: Customer code 20 was assigned to only a single company-owned 707 demonstrator. However, Boeing often referred to different variants of the 707 and 720 using the customer code in marketing material, regardless of whether any individual aircraft carried it.)								
21	Pan Am / Pan American-Grace Airways	707-121; 707-121B; 707-321; 707-321B; 707-321C			727-21; 727-21C; 727-21QC; 727-121C; 727-221		747-121; 747SP-21; 747-221F			
22	United Airlines		720-022		727-22; 727-22C; 727-22QC; 727-222	737-222; 737-322; 737-522	747-122; 747-222B; 747-422	757-222	767-222; 767-322	777-222 777-322ER
23	American Airlines	707-123; 707-123B; 707-323B; 707-323C	720-023; 720-023B		727-23; 727-123; 727-223	737-823	747-123	757-223	767-223; 767-223(ER); 767-323; 767-323(ER)	777-223; 777-323ER
24	Continental Airlines → United Airlines	707-124; 707-324C	720-024B		727-24C; 727-224	737-524; 737-724; 737-824; 737-924; 737-924ER	747-124	757-224; 757-324	767-224; 767-324; 767-424ER	777-224
25	Eastern Air Lines		720-025		727-25; 727-25C; 72-225		747-125 (Note: Delivered to a different operator)	757-225		
26	United States Air Force - Military Air Transport Service									
27	Braniff International Airways	707-227; 707-327C	720-027		727-27; 727-27C; 727-227		747-127; 747SP-27; 747-227B			
28	Air France	707-328; 707-328B; 707-328C			727-228	737-228; 737-528	747-128; 747-228B; 747-228BC; 747-228F; 747-428; 747-428F		767-328	777-228; 777-328ER; 777-F28
29	Sabena → SN Brussels Airlines → Brussels Airlines	707-329; 707-329C			727-29; 727-29C	737-229; 737-229C; 737-329; 737-429; 737-529	747-129; 747-329			
30	Lufthansa / Condor Flugdienst	707-330B; 707-330C; 707-430	720-030B		727-30; 727-30C; 727-230	737-130; 737-230; 737-230C; 737-230F; 737-330; 737-430; 737-530	747-130; 747-230B; 747-230BC; 747-230F; 747-430; 747-830	757-230; 757-330	767-330	
31	Trans World Airlines	707-131; 707-131B; 707-331; 707-331B; 707-331C		717-231	727-31; 727-31C; 727-231		747-131; 747SP-31	757-231	767-231	
32	Delta Air Lines				727-232	737-232; 737-332; 737-732; 737-832; 737-932ER	747-132	757-232	767-232; 767-332; 767-432ER	777-232; 777-232LR
33	Air Canada				727-233		747-133; 747-233B; 747-233BC; 747-433		767-233; 767-233(ER); 767-333 767-333(ER)	777-233LR; 777-333ER
34	Transair Sweden				727-134; 727-134C					
35	National Airlines				727-35; 727-235		747-135			
36	British Overseas Airways Corporation → British Airways	707-336B; 707-336C; 707-436				737-236; 737-436	747-136; 747-236B; 747-236F; 747-436	757-236	767-336; 767-336(ER)	777-236; 777-336ER
37	Air India	707-337B; 707-337C; 707-437					747-237B; 747-337; 747-337BC; 747-437			777-237LR; 777-337ER
38	Qantas	707-138; 707-138B; 707-338C				737-838	747SP-38; 747-238B; 747-238BC; 747-238BL; 747-238BLW; 747-338; 747-438		767-238; 767-238(ER); 767-338; 767-338(ER)	
39	Cubana de Aviación	707-139; 707-139B								
40	Pakistan International Airlines	707-340C	720-040B			737-340	747-240B; 747-240BC			777-240; 777-240LR; 777-340ER
41	Varig	707-341C; 707-441			727-41	737-241; 737-341	747-341; 747-441		767-241; 767-341	
42	Nordair					737-242; 737-242C				
43	Alitalia				727-243		747-143; 747-243B; 747-243F; 747-443		767-343	777-243
44	South African Airways	707-344; 707-344B; 707-344C			727-44; 727-44C	737-244; 737-844	747SP-44; 747-244B; 747-249BC; 747-344; 747-444			
45	Seaboard World Airlines	707-345C					747-245F			
46	Japan Airlines				727-46	737-446; 737-846	747-146; 747-146B; 747SR-46; 747SR-146B; 747-246B; 747-246F; 747-346; 747-446; 747-446D; 747-446F		767-246; 767-346; 767-346F	777-246; 777-346; 777-346ER
47	Western Airlines	707-347C	720-047B		727-247	737-247; 737-347	747-247B			
48	Aer Lingus	707-348C	720-048			737-248; 737-248C; 737-348; 737-448; 737-548	747-148			
49	Flying Tiger Line	707-349C					747-249F			
50	Trek Airways									
51	Northwest Orient Airlines → Northwest Airlines → Delta Air Lines	707-351B; 707-351C	720-051B		727-51; 727-51C; 727-151C; 727-251		747-151; 747-251B; 747-251F; 747-451; 747-451B	757-251; 757-351		
52	Aeroméxico					737-752; 737-852			767-352	
53	United States Air Force	707-153 (Note: Designated C-137A/B Stratoliner by the USAF); 707-153B; 707-353B (Note: Designated C-137C Stratoliner by the USAF)				737-253 (Note: Designated T-43 by the USAF)				
54	Mohawk Airlines				727-254					
55	Executive Jet Aviation	707-355C			727-155C					
56	Iberia				727-256		747-156; 747-256B	757-256		
57	Swissair						747-257B; 747-357; 747-357BC			
58	El Al	707-358B; 707-358C; 707-458	720-058B			737-258; 737-758; 737-858; 737-958ER	747-258B; 747-258C; 747-258F; 747-458	757-258	767-258	777-258
59	Avianca	707-359B	720-059B		727-59; 727-259	737-159	747-259B; 747-259C		767-259	
60	Ethiopian Airlines	707-360C	720-060B		727-260	737-260; 737-760; 737-860		757-260; 757-260PF	767-260; 767-260(ER); 767-360	777-260LR; 777-360ER; 777-F60
61	Federal Aviation Administration				727-61					
62	Pacific Northern Airlines		720-062		727-62C; 727-162					
63	WAAC	Not used								
63	Ghana Airways	Not used								
63	Faucett				727-63					
64	Mexicana				727-64; 727-264					
65	Cunard Eagle and British Eagle	707-365C; 707-465								
66	United Arab Airlines → Egyptair	707-366C				737-266; 737-566; 737-866	747-366		767-266; 767-266(ER); 767-366; 767-366(ER)	777-266
67	Cathay Pacific						747-267B; 747-267F; 747-367; 747-467; 747-467F; 747-867F			777-267; 777-367; 777-367ER
68	Saudia	707-368C	720-068B			737-268; 737-268C	747-168B; 747SP-68; 747-268F; 747-368; 747-468			777-268; 777-368ER
69	Kuwait Airways	707-369C			727-269	737-269	747-269B; 747-269BC; 747-469		767-269; 767-269(ER)	777-269
70	Iraqi Airways	707-370C			727-270	737-270C	747SP-70; 747-270C			
71	Trans International Airlines → Transamerica Airlines				727-171; 727-171C		747-271C			
72	Airlift International	707-372C			727-172C					
73	World Airways	707-373C			727-173C		747-273C			
74	Iraqi Airways	Not used								
74	Libyan Arab	Not used								
75	Pacific Western → Canadian Airlines					737-275; 737-275C; 737-375	747-475		767-275; 767-375; 767-375(ER)	
76	Trans Australia Airlines → Australian Airlines				727-76; 727-276	737-376; 737-476				
77	Ansett Australia				727-77; 727-77C; 727-277	737-277; 737-377			767-277	
78	British West Indian Airways				727-78					
79	Saturn Airways	707-379C								
80	Bankers Trust				727-180C					
81	Línea Aeropostal Venezolana	Not used								
81	All Nippon Airways				727-81; 727-281	737-281; 737-781; 737-881	747SR-81; 747-281B; 747-281F; 747-481; 747-481D; 747-481F		767-281; 767-381; 767-381F	777-281; 777-381; 777-381ER
82	TAP Air Portugal	707-382B			727-82; 727-82C; 727-282	737-282; 737-282C; 737-382	747-282B			
83	Scandinavian Airlines					737-683; 737-783; 737-883	747-283B		767-283; 767-383; 767-383(ER)	
84	Olympic Airways → Olympic Airlines → Olympic Air	707-384B; 707-384C			727-284	737-284; 737-484	747-284B		767-284	
85	American Flyers	707-385C			727-185; 727-185C					
86	Iran Air	707-386C			727-86; 727-286	737-286; 737-286C	747-186B; 747SP-86; 747-286B; 747-286BC			
87	Aerolíneas Argentinas	707-387B; 707-387C			727-287	737-287; 737-287C	747-287B			
88	Middle East Airlines									
88	Aerotechnik Deutsche Charter									
89	Japan Domestic Airlines → Toa Domestic Airlines → Japan Air System				727-89					777-289
90	Alaska Airlines				727-90C; 727-290	737-290C; 737-490; 737-790; 737-890; 737-990; 737-990ER				
91	Frontier Airlines				727-191; 727-291	737-291				
92	Southern Air Transport				727-92C					
93	Pacific Air Lines				727-193	737-293				
94	Syrian Arab Airlines				727-294		747SP-94			
95	Northeast Airlines				727-95; 727-295					
96	Quebecair → Nordair	707-396C				737-296				
97	Aloha Airlines					737-297; 737-497				
98	Capital Airlines	Not used								
98	Air Zaïre					737-298C				
99	Avensa	Not used								
99	Caledonian Airways → British Caledonian	707-399C								

=== Second sequence ===
Code	Customer	Aircraft						
Code	Customer	707	727	737	747	757	767	777
00	Boeing (Note: Customer code 00 was assigned only to company-owned aircraft, such as prototypes and demonstrators. However, Boeing often used the customer code in marketing material, regardless of whether any individual aircraft carried it. After customer codes were dropped in 2017, some new aircraft continued to carry model numbers ending in "00", but these are left out of this table as they are not customer codes.)	707-700	727-200			757-200	767-200	777-200
01	Piedmont Airlines			737-201; 737-301; 737-401			767-201; 767-201(ER)	
02	Northern Consolidated Airlines			737-202C				
03	Caribair (Caribbean Atlantic Airlines)	Not used						
04	Panair do Brasil	Not used						
04	Britannia Airways → Thomson Airways			737-204; 737-204C; 737-804		757-204	767-204; 767-304	
05	Braathens SAFE → Braathens → SAS Braathens → SAS Norge			737-205; 737-205C; 737-405; 737-505; 737-705			767-205	
06	KLM			737-306; 737-406	747-206B; 747-306; 747-406; 747-406F		767-306	777-206; 777-306ER
07	West German Air Force	707-307C						
08	Icelandair		727-108C; 727-208	737-408; 737-808		757-208; 757-308		
09	China Airlines	707-309C	727-109; 727-109C	737-209; 737-809	747SP-09; 747-209B; 747-209BC; 747-209F; 747-409; 747-409F		767-209	777-309ER
10	Wien Consolidated → Wien Air Alaska			737-210; 737-210C				
11	Wardair	707-311C	727-11		747-211B			
12	Malaysia-Singapore Airlines → Singapore Airlines	707-312B	727-212	737-112; 737-212	747-212B; 747-212F; 747-312; 747-412; 747-412F	757-212	767-212; 767-312	777-212; 777-312ER
13	Ariana Afghan Airlines		727-113C					
14	Pacific Southwest Airlines		727-14; 727-114; 727-214	737-214				
15	Lake Central Airlines	Not used						
16	LAN Chile → LAN Airlines (LATAM Chile)		727-116; 727-116C				767-216; 767-216(ER); 767-316; 767-316F	777-F16
17	Canadian Pacific Air Lines → CP Air		727-17; 727-217	737-217; 737-317	747-217B			
18	British European Airways	Not used						
19	New Zealand National Airways Corporation → Air New Zealand			737-219; 737-219C; 737-319	747-219B; 747-419		767-219; 767-219(ER); 767-319	777-219; 777-319ER

=== Third sequence ===
Code	Customer	Aircraft							
Code	Customer	707	717	727	737	747	757	767	777
A0	LAB Airlines			727-1A0					
A1	VASP			727-2A1	737-2A1; 737-2A1C; 737-3A1				
A2	Modern Air								
A3	Pluna				737-2A3				
A4	AirCal				737-2A4; 737-3A4				
A6	Essex International / LTV Capital				737-2A6				
A7	Trans Caribbean Airways			727-1A7C; 727-2A7					
A8	Indian Airlines				737-2A8; 737-2A8C				
A9	Transair				737-2A9; 737-2A9C				
B0	China Cargo Airlines								
B1	DETA Mozambique / Linhas Aéreas de Moçambique				737-2B1; 737-2B1C			767-2B1	
B2	Air Madagascar				737-2B2	747-2B2B; 747-2B2BC			
B3	Union de Transports Aériens (UTA)				737-3B3; 737-4B3	747-2B3B; 747-2B3BC; 747-2B3BF; 747-2B3F; 747-3B3; 747-4B3			
B4	Middle East Airlines (MEA)	707-3B4C				747-2B4B; 747-2B4(BC)			
B5	Korean Air	707-3B5C			737-7B5 (Note: BBJ); 737-8B5; 737-9B5; 737-9B5ER	747SP-B5; 747-2B5B; 747-2B5BF; 747-2B5F; 747-3B5; 747-4B5; 747-4B5F; 747-8B5; 747-8B5F			777-2B5; 777-3B5; 777-3B5ER; 777-FB5
B6	Royal Air Maroc			727-2B6	737-2B6; 737-2B6C; 737-4B6; 737-5B6; 737-7B6; 737-8B6	747-2B6B; 747-2B6BC	757-2B6		
B7	Allegheny Airlines → US Air → US Airways			727-2B7	737-2B7; 737-3B7; 737-4B7		757-2B7	767-2B7	
B8	Austrian Airlines								777
C0	GATX / Boothe				737-2C0				
C3	Cruzeiro do Sul			727-C3; 727-1C3	737-2C3				
C9	Luxair				737-2C9; 737-4C9; 737-5C9; 737-7C9; 737-8C9				
D1	Universal Airlines					747-1D1			
D3	Royal Jordanian	707-3D3C		727-2D3		747-2D3B; 747-2D3BC			
D4	Ozark Airlines			727-2D4					
D6	Air Algérie			727-2D6	737-2D6; 737-2D6C; 737-6D6; 737-7D6C; 737-8D6			767-3D6	
D7	Thai Airways				737-4D7	747-2D7B; 747-3D7; 747-4D7			777-2D7; 777-3D7; 777-3D7ER
E0	Dubai Royal Air Wing				737-7E0; 737-8E0 (Note: BBJ2)				
E1	Eastern Provincial Airways				737-2E1				
E3	Ladeco				737-2E3				
E4					737-8E4				
E7	Arkia				737-2E7		757-3E7		
E9	Biman Bangladesh Airlines				737-8E9				777-3E9ER
F1	Air New Zealand	Not used							
F2	Turkish Airlines			727-2F2	737-8F2; 737-9F2ER				777-3F2ER
F3	Government of Argentina	707-3F3B							
F4						747-2F4B			
F5	Government of Portugal / Portuguese Air Force	707-3F5C							
F6	Philippine Airlines					747-2F6B; 747-4F6			777-3F6ER
F8	Royal Nepal Airlines → Nepal Airlines			727-1F8			757-2F8; 757-2F8C; 757-2F8CB		
F9	Nigeria Airways	707-3F9C		727-2F9	737-2F9				
G1	Government of Saudi Arabia					747-3G1			
G4	United States Air Force					747-2G4B (Note: Designated VC-25A by the USAF); 747-4G4F (Note: Designated YAL-1 by the USAF)	757-2G4 (Note: Designated C-32A by the USAF)		
G5	L.T.S → LTU International						757-2G5	767-3G5; 767-3G5(ER)	
G7	America West Airlines				737-3G7		757-2G7		
H0	Oman Royal Flight					747-8H0 (Note: BBJ 747)			
H2	ITT			727-1H2					
H3	Tunisair			727-2H3	737-2H3; 737-2H3C; 737-5H3; 737-6H3; 737-7H3				
H4	Southwest Airlines				737-2H4; 737-2H4C; 737-3H4; 737-5H4; 737-7H4; 737-8H4				
H5	Mey Air				737-2H5				
H6	Malaysia Airlines				737-2H6; 737-2H6C; 737-3H6; 737-4H6; 737-5H6; 737-7H6; 737-8H6	747-3H6; 747-4H6; 747-4H6F			777-2H6
H7	Cameroon Airlines	707-3H7C			737-2H7C	747-2H7BC			
H9	JAT Yugoslav Airlines			727-2H9	737-3H9				
J0	Air Jamaica			727-2J0					
J1	Dominicana			727-1J1; 727-2J1					
J4	Sterling Airways → Cimber Sterling			727-2J4			757-2J4		
J6	Civil Aviation Administration of China → Air China (until 1999)	707-3J6B; 707-3J6C			737-3J6	747SP-J6; 747-2J6B; 747-2J6BC; 747-2J6F; 747-4J6		767-2J6; 767-3J6	777-2J6
J7	National Aircraft Leasing			727-2J7					
J8	Sudan Airways	707-3J8C			737-2J8; 737-2J8C				
J9	Imperial Iranian Air Force	707-3J9C				747-2J9F			
K1	TAROM / Government of Romania	707-3K1C							
K2	Transavia (KLM)				737-2K2; 737-2K2C; 737-3K2; 737-7K2; 737-8K2; 737-9K2		757-2K2		
K3	Aviogenex			727-2K3	737-2K3				
K5	Hapag-Lloyd Flug → TUI Group			727-2K5	737-2K5; 737-4K5; 737-5K5; 737-7K5; 737-8K5				
K6	Sahsa				737-2K6				
K9	Bavaria Flug		717-2K9		737-2K9; 737-3K9; 737-7K9; 737-8K9				
L4	American Capital Aviation			727-2L4	737-2L4				
L5	Libyan Arab Airlines	707-3L5C		727-2L5		747-2L5B			
L6	Aviation Services & Support	707-3L6B; 707-3L6C							
L7	Air Nauru				737-2L7; 737-2L7C; 737-4L7				
L8	Government of Yugoslavia			727-2L8					
L9	Maersk Air				737-2L9; 737-3L9; 737-5L9; 737-7L9				
M0	Aeroflot				737-4M0				777-3M0ER
M1	Pertamina Oil Pelita Air Service	707-3M1C		727-2M1					
M2	TAAG Angola Airlines				737-2M2; 737-2M2C; 737-7M2				777-2M2; 777-3M2ER
M6	Royal Brunei Airlines				737-2M6; 737-2M6C		757-2M6		
M7	Hughes Air West			727-2M7					
M8	Trans European Airways				737-2M8; 737-3M8				
M9	Zambia Airways				737-2M9				
N0	Air Zimbabwe				737-2N0			767-2N0	
N1	Government of Venezuela				737-2N1				
N3	Brazilian Air Force				737-2N3				
N6	Government of Nigeria			727-2N6	737-7N6				
N7	Government of Egypt				737-2N7				
N8	Yemenair Yemen Airways			727-2N8	737-2N8				
N9	Government of Niger / Air Niger				737-2N9C				
P1	State of Qatar	707-3P1C		727-2P1					
P3	Al Waleed bin Talal Al Saud				737-7P3				
P5	Thai Airways				737-2P5				
P6	Gulf Air				737-2P6			767-3P6; 767-3P6(ER)	
P8	Bahrain Amiri Flight					747-4P8			
Q2	Air Gabon				737-2Q2C	747-2Q2B; 747-2Q2BC			
Q3	Southwest Air Lines Japan, → Japan Transocean Air			727-2Q3	737-2Q3; 737-4Q3; 737-8Q3	747-4Q3			
Q4	Transbrasil			727-2Q4	737-3Q4			767-2Q4	
Q5	Air Liberia				737-2Q5C				
Q6	Lacsa			727-2Q6					
Q8	International Lease Finance Corporation			727-2Q8	737-2Q8; 737-2Q8C; 737-3Q8; 737-4Q8; 737-5Q8; 737-6Q8; 737-7Q8; 737-8Q8	747-4Q8	757-2Q8	767-2Q8; 767-3Q8	777-2Q8; 777-3Q8ER
Q9	Itel Corp.			727-2Q9	737-2Q9				
R1	Government of Cameroon			727-2R1					
R4	Alyemda				737-2R4C				
R6	Air Guinee				737-2R6C				
R7	Cargolux					747-2R7F; 747-8R7F			
R8	Air Tanzania				737-2R8C				
S1	TACA International Airlines				737-3S1			767-2S1; 767-3S1	
S2	FedEx Express			727-2S2F	737-2S2C			767-3S2F	777-FS2
S3	Air Europe /Sunrock Aircraft				737-2S3; 737-3S3; 737-4S3; 737-8S3				
S4	Air Afrique					747-2S4F			
S5	Eldorado Aviation				737-2S5C				
S7	North Central Airlines / Republic Airlines			727-2S7			757-2S7		
S9	Maritime Investments				737-2S9				
T0	Texas Air Corp / Continental Airlines				737-3T0				
T2	Dome Petroleum				737-2T2; 737-2T2C				
T3	Evergreen			727-2T3					
T4	Air Florida				737-2T4; 737-2T4C				
T5	Orion Airways				737-2T5; 737-3T5				
T7	Monarch Airlines				737-2T7		757-2T7	767-3T7	
T8	Boeing Polaris Leasing							767-3T8	
T9	Boeing							767-3T9(ER)	
U3	Garuda Indonesia, Government of Indonesia				737-3U3; 737-4U3; 737-5U3; 737-8U3	747-2U3B; 747-4U3			777-3U3ER
U4	OSL Villa Holidays				737-2U4				
U5	Government of Jordan			727-2U5					
U8	Kenya Airways				737-3U8; 737-7U8				777-2U8; 777-3U8ER
U9	Polynesian Airlines				737-2U9				
V2	TAME				737-2V2				
V3	Copa Airlines				737-7V3; 737-8V3				
V5	Bahamasair				737-2V5				
V6	Petrolair Systems				737-2V6				
V8	Air Executive / Busy Bee								
W0	China Yunnan Airlines				737-3W0; 737-7W0			767-3W0	
W2	Aerotour								
W6	Government of Morocco	707-3W6C							
W8	NOGA Import				737-2W8				
X2	Air Pacific (became Fiji Airways)				737-2X2; 737-7X2; 737-8X2			767-3X2	
X3	Air Charter International			727-2X3					
X4	Supair								
X6	MarkAir				737-2X6C				
X8	Wedge Aviation / Wistair Corp			727-2X8					
X9	Indonesian Air Force			727-2X9	737-2X9 (Note: Designated Surveiller by the Indonesian Air Force)				
Y0	Guinness Peat Aviation				737-3Y0; 737-4Y0; 737-5Y0		757-2Y0	767-3Y0	
Y4	Rafik Hariri			727-2Y4					
Y5	Air Malta				737-2Y5; 737-3Y5				
Y9	Air Malawi				737-3Y9				
Z0	China Southwest Airlines				737-3Z0; 737-8Z0		757-2Z0		
Z5	Government of Abu Dhabi United Arab Emirates Royal Flight				737-7Z5	747SP-Z5; 747-8Z5			
Z6	Royal Thai Air Force				737-2Z6; 737-3Z6; 737-4Z6; 737-8Z6				
Z8	South Korean Air Force				737-3Z8				
Z9	Lauda Air				737-3Z9; 737-4Z9; 737-6Z9; 737-7Z9; 737-8Z9			767-3Z9; 767-3Z9(ER)	777-2Z9

=== Fourth sequence ===
Code	Customer	Aircraft					
Code	Customer	717	737	747	757	767	777
0B	China Cargo Airlines			747-40BF			
1A	Martinair			747-21AC		767-31A	
1B	China Southern Airlines		737-31B; 737-71B; 737-81B	747-41BF	757-21B	767-31B	777-21B; 777-31BER; 777-F1B
1C	Government of Romania						
1D	AWAS		737-81D				
1E	Escalera Executive Air Services Inc.						
1H	Emirates						777-21H; 777-21HLR; 777-31H; 777-31HER; 777-F1H
1K	Airtours International Airways				757-21K	767-31K	
1L	China Xinjiang Airlines		737-31L				
1M	Oman Air		737-71M; 737-81M; 737-91MER				
1Q	Tombo Aviation		737-71Q; 737-81Q				
1R	Virgin Atlantic			747-41R			
1S	Deutsche BA → DBA	717-21S	737-31S				
1U							
1Z	Iraqi Airways		737-81Z				
2A	Hawaiian Airlines	717-22A					
2C	Air UK Leisure		737-42C				
2J	Arab Leasing		737-42J				
2K	Turkmenistan Airlines / Akhal	717-22K	737-72K; 737-82K		757-22K	767-32K	777-22KLR
2L	Azerbaijan Airlines				757-22L	767-32L; 767-32LF	
2P	Government of United Arab Emirates						
2Q	Ukraine International Airlines		737-32Q				
2R	Pegasus Airlines		737-42R; 737-82R				
2T	Nakajima Aerial Tours Ltd.		737-72T				
2U	JABJ / Picton II Ltd.		737-72U				
2W	TAM Brazilian Airlines (LATAM Brasil)						777-32WER
2Y	Mitsubishi Commercial Aviation Partners		737-82Y				
2Z			737-82Z				
3A	AWAS		737; 737-33A; 737-53A; 737-73A		757-23A; 757-23APF	767-33A	
3B	Air Mauritius					767-23B; 767-23B(ER)	
3C	Euralair International		737-53C				
3N	American Trans Air / ATA Airlines		737-83N		757-23N; 757-33N		
3P	Uzbekistan Airways				757-23P	767-33P	
3Q	BCC Equipment Leasing		737-43Q; 737-73Q	747-83QF			
3R	Western Pacific Airlines		737-33R				
3S	Pembroke Capital	717-23S	737-33S; 737-53S; 737-73S				
3T	FirstFlight Air Charters Ltd.		737-73T				
3U	Chartwell Aircraft Company / Chartwell Partners		737-73U				
3V	EasyJet		737-33V; 737-73V				
3W			737-73W				
3Y	Somon Air		737-93YER				
3Z	Donghai Airlines		737-83Z				
4A	United Parcel Service			747-44AF	757-24APF	767-34AF	
4G	MIAT Mongolian					767-34G	
4K	Air Nippon		737-54K				
4N	North China Administration / China United Airlines		737-34N				
4P	Hainan Airlines		737-44P; 737-74P; 737-84P			767-34P	
4Q	Mid East Jet		737-74Q		757-24Q	767-24Q	777-24Q
4R	AeroSvit Airlines		737-84R				
4S	GB Airways		737-34S				
4T	North Pacific Aviation		737-74T				
4U	Air Shamrock		737-74U				
4V	Superior International Aviation Services		737-74V				
4X	Sky Airlines		737-94XER				
4Y	RwandAir		737-84Y				
5A	Midway Airlines / Presidential Airways		737-25A				
5B	Germania		737-35B; 737-75B				
5C	Xiamen Airlines		737-25C; 737-75C; 737-85C		757-25C		
5D	LOT Polish Airlines		737-45D; 737-55D			767-25D; 767-35D	
5E	EVA Airways			747-45E; 747-45EF		767-25E; 767-35E	777-35EER
5F	GATX Capital Corporation		737-85F		757-25F		
5G	MGM Mirage		737-75G				
5H	Itochu Air Lease Corporation		737-85H			767-35H	
5M	Transaero			747-85M (Note: Delivered to the United States Air Force for modification to VC-25B standard)			
5N	Shandong Airlines		737-35N; 737-75N; 737-85N				
5P	Air Europa		737-85P				
5R	Jet Airways		737-45R; 737-75R; 737-85R; 737-95R				777-35RER
5S	Czech Airlines		737-45S; 737-55S				
5T	First Union Commercial Corporation		737-75T				
5U	Digong Duterte Private Aviation Inc.		737-75U				
5V	General Electric Corporation		737-75V				
6B	Cal Air / Novair International Airways		737-46B				
6D	Shanghai Airlines		737-76D; 737-86D		757-26D	767-36D	
6E	Viva Air		737-36E				
6J	Air Berlin		737-46J; 737-76J; 737-86J				
6K	Vietnam Airlines						777-26K
6M	Eurobelgium Airlines → Virgin Express		737-36M; 737-46M				
6N	GECAS		737-36N; 737-46N; 737-56N; 737-66N; 737-76N; 737-86N; 737-96NER	747-46NF		767-36N	777-36NER; 777-F6N
6Q	Boullion Aircraft Holding		737-36Q; 737-46Q; 737-76Q; 737-86Q				
6R	Wuhan Airlines	717-26R	737-36R; 737-86R				
6X	9 Air		737-86X				
6W	Urumqi Airlines						
7A	Far Eastern Air Transport		737-27A		757-27A		
7B	Air Holland				757-27B		
7C	Japan Air Self-Defense Force			747-47C		767-27C	
7D	Air Seychelles					767-37D	
7E	Aeromaritime International					767-27E; 767-37E	
7G	Malev					767-27G	
7K	Zhongyuan Airlines		737-37K				
7L	Shenzhen Airlines		737-77L; 737-87L; 737-97L				
7Q	Novel Leasing Company		737-37Q				
7U	Atlas Air			747-47UF; 747-87UF			
7W	Royal Jet First		737-77W				
7Y			737-97YER (Note: BBJ3)				
7Z			737-77Z				
8A	Air 2000				757-28A	767-38A	
8B	Istanbul Airlines		737-38B				
8E	Asiana Airlines		737-48E; 737-58E	747-48E; 747-48EF		767-38E; 767-38EF	777-28E
8J	TAROM		737-38J; 737-78J				
8L	Nok Air		737-88L				
8N	Chilean Air Force		737-58N				
8S	China Xinjiang Airlines		737-78S		757-28S		
9A	ARAVCO		737-39A				
9B	Government of Brunei						
9D	Linjeflyg		737-59D				
9H	Leisure International Airways					767-39H	
9J	Shorouk Air				757-29J		
9K	Shenzhen Airlines		737-39K; 737-79K				
9L	Air China (from 1999)		737-79L; 737-89L	747-89L			777-39LER
9M	Air Austral		737-39M; 737-89M				777-29MLR; 777-39MER
9N	Mid East Jet						
9P	China Eastern Airlines		737-39P; 737-79P; 737-89P				777-39PER
9R	Pro Air		737-49R				
9T	BBM Aviation Inc.		737-79T				
9U	Cokaliong Lines		737-79U				
9V			737-79V				

=== Fifth and final sequence ===
Code	Customer	Aircraft					
Code	Customer	717	737	747	757	767	777
AA	Alan Abrina Aircraft Leasing Corp.						
AB	AB Airlines						
AD	Eastwind Airlines		737-7AD				
AF	United States Navy / Marines		737-7AF				
AH	General Electric Credit Corporation		737-7AH				
AJ	Saudi Ministry of Finance and Economy		737-7AJ; 737-8AJ				
AK	PrivatAir		737-7AK				
AL	Singapore Aircraft Leasing Enterprise → BOC Aviation		737-8AL				777-3ALER
AN	Saudi Oger		737-7AN; 737-8AN				777-2AN
AR	Republic of China Air Force		737-8AR				
AS	Ryanair		737-8AS				
AU	Aircraft Guaranty Title Corp.		737-7AU				
AV	Newsflight II Inc.		737-7AV				
AW	A.S. Bugsham & Bros.		737-7AW; 737-8AW				
AX	Saudi ARAMCO		737-7AX			767-2AX	
AZ	AstraZeneca Aviation						
BC	Boeing NetJets		737-7BC				
BD	AirTran Airways	717-2BD	737-7BD				
BF	Funair Corp.		737-7BF				
BG	Flightlease AG → GATX Jet Partners		737-8BG			767-3BG	
BH	TBN Aircraft Corporation		737-7BH				
BJ	Atlas Air		737-7BJ				
BK	CIT Leasing Corp.		737-7BK; 737-8BK				
BL	Midwest Airlines	717-2BL					
BQ	GECAS		737-7BQ; 737-9BQER				
BS	North American Airlines						
BT	Lufthansa Cargo						777-FBT
BX	Midway Airlines		737-7BX				
CB	BCC Equipment Leasing Corporation					767-3CB	
CG	GKW Aviation		737-7CG				
CJ	BBJ One		737-7CJ				
CM	Aerolíneas de Baleares Aebal	717-2CM					
CN	Matela Offshore		737-7CN				
CP	Ford		737-7CP				
CQ	JMC Airlines				757-3CQ		
CT	WestJet		737-6CT; 737-7CT; 737-8CT				
CU	Tutor-Saliba Corp		737-7CU				
CX	GATX - Flightlease		737-8CX				
DC	Miami Air International		737-8DC				
DE	Swiss International Air Lines						777-3DEER
DF	Royal Australian Air Force		737-7DF				
DM	United States Air Force		737-7DM				
DO	Matugas Air Tours						
DP	Royal Saudi Air Force		737-7DP; 737-8DP				
DR	Multiflight		737-8DR				
DT	Qantas Defence Services / Royal Australian Air Force		737-7DT				
DV	Lowa Ltd		737-8DV				
DW	Bausch & Lomb		737-7DW				
DX	Kazakhstan Airlines					767-2DX	
DZ	Qatar Airways						777-2DZLR; 777-3DZER; 777-FDZ
EA	Azteca Airlines		737-7EA				
EC	Dubai Air Wing		737-8EC				
ED	South African Air Force		737-7ED				
EE	Air Senegal International		737-7EE				
EF	Mid East Jet		737-8EF				
EG	Samsung Aerospace		737-7EG				
EH	Gol Transportes Aéreos		737-7EH; 737-8EH				
EI			737-7EI				
EJ	Grupo Omnilife S.A. de C.V.		737-7EJ				
EL	Swiflite Aircraft Corporation		737-7EL				
EM	LUK Aviation		737-7EM				
EO			737-7EO				
EQ	EIE Eagle Incorporated		737-8EQ				
ES	Royal Australian Air Force		737-7ES (Note: Designated E-7A Wedgetail by the RAAF)				
ET	EnigmaFly Corp.		737-7ET				
EV	Jade Cargo International		737-8EV	747-4EVF			
EX	Amiri Flight Line		737-8EX				
EY	Italian Air Force					767-2EY	
EZ	Air Hong Kong						777-FEZ
FB	Government of Equatorial Guinea/CEIBA International		737-7FB; 737-8FB				777-2FBLR
FD	Lee Business Aviation Ltd.		737-7FD				
FE	Virgin Blue → Virgin Australia		737-7FE; 737-8FE				
FG	Saudi Arabia Ministry of Finance and Economy, Saudi Cargo		737-7FG; 737-9FGER				777-3FGER; 777-FFG
FH	SMBC Aviation Capital		737-8FH				
FK	Japan Air Self-Defense Force					767-2FK (Note: Designated KC-767J by the JASDF)	
FN	Travel Service		737-8FN				
FS	Turkish Air Force		737-7FS (Note: Designated E-7T Peace Eagle by the TuAF)			767-4FSER	
FT	Air China Cargo			747-4FTF			777-FFT
FV	United States Navy		737-8FV (Note: Designated P-8A Poseidon by the USAF)				
FX	Etihad Airways						777-3FXER; 777-FFX
FY	CIT Group/Equipment Financing		737-7FY				
FZ	Babcock & Brown Aircraft Management		737-8FZ				
GB	United States Navy						
GC	Vizavi		737-7GC				
GE			737-7GE				
GG	GoodGame Air Tours & Services		737-8GG				
GJ	SpiceJet		737-7GJ; 737-8GJ; 737-9GJER				
GK	Buraq Air		737-8GK				
GL	SkyEurope		737-7GL				
GP	Lion Air, Malindo Air, Thai Lion Air, Batik Air		737-8GP; 737-9GPER				
GQ	Pegasus Aviation Finance		737-8GQ				
GR	Turkmenistan Airlines						
GS	Sunwing Airlines		737-8GS				
GU	Atlant Soyuz → Moscow Airlines		737-8GU				
GV	Gulfview Aircraft Leasing		737-7GV				
HA	Guggenheim Aviation Partners			747-4HAF			
HB	SonAir		737-7HB; 737-7HBC				
HC	SunExpress		737-8HC				
HD	Dennis Vanguard International		737-7HD				
HE	Andrey Melnichenko		737-7HE				
HF	Luxury Ocean Ltd		737-7HF				
HG	Air India Express		737-8HG				
HI	Indian Air Force		737-7HI				
HJ	Peregrine Point		737-7HJ				
HO	ALAFCO		737-8HO				
HQ	LoadAir Cargo			747-4HQF			
HT	Guggenheim Investment Fund			747-8HTF			777-FHT
HV	Volga-Dnepr Airlines			747-8HVF			
HW	Middle East Jet		737-9HWER				
HX	Aviation Capital Group		737-8HX				
HZ	Itera Holdings		737-7HZ				
JA	National Air Services		737-9JAER (Note: BBJ3)	747-8JA			s
JB	Jet Aviation Business Jets		737-7JB				
JE	Arik Air		737-8JE				
JF	Aircraft Guaranty Corporation		737-7JF				
JH	DHL Aviation					767-3JHF	
JK	Government of Kuwait			747-8JK			
JM			737-8JM				
JP	Norwegian Air Shuttle		737-8JP				
JR	Bank of Utah		737-7JR				
JU	Felham 3 Limited		737-7JU				
JV			737-7JV				
JW	Wuleen Investment Corp		737-7JW				
JY	First Virtual Air II LLC		737-7JY				
JZ	Pfizer-BioNTech Airlift Division		737-7JZ				
KB	Qatar Amiri Flight		737-8KB	747-8KB			
KF	Okay Airways		737-8KF; 737-9KFER				
KG	Dubai Aerospace Enterprise		737-8KG				
KK	Pacific Sky Aviation		737-7KK				
KN	Flydubai		737-8KN				
KQ							777-2KQLR (Note: BBJ 777)
KT	Seven Three Seven Two Aviation		737-8KT				
KV	Ukraine International Airlines		737-8KV; 737-9KVER				
KY	Air Astana					767-3KY	
KZ	Nippon Cargo Airlines			747-4KZF; 747-8KZF			
LB	Purple Holdings Management		737-9LBER				
LC	Jeju Air		737-8LC				
LD	Kulula.com (Comair)		737-8LD				
LF	Sriwijaya Air		737-9LFER				
LJ	Aviation Capital Services (Russian Federation)		737-8LJ				
LK	United States Air Force					767-2LKC (Note: KC-46 Pegasus prototype)	
LP	Utair		737-8LP; 737-9LPER				
LQ				747-8LQ			
LT			737-7LT				
LW	Hebei Airlines		737-8LW				
LX			737-8LX				
LY	China Development Bank Finance		737-8LY				
LZ	Liezel Air Tours & Services		737-8LZ				
MA	Junior Philippine Association of Management Accountants		737-8MA				
MB	ICBC Argentina		737-8MB				
MC	Sberbank Leasing		737-8MC				
MD	Aviation Finance and Leasing S.a.r.l.						
ME	Ruili Airlines		737-7ME				
MG	Jet2		737-8MG				
MJ	Bulgaria Air						
SA	SilkAir		737-8SA				
SB	Japan Air Self-Defense Force						
SH	Air Lease Corporation		737-8SH				777-3SHER
XY	LAM Mozambique Airlines						
ZB	Southern Air						777-FZB
ZE	Eastarjet		737-8ZE				
ZF	Hansel Prime Limited		737-7ZF				
ZG	V Australia						777-3ZGER
ZH	Nanshan Jet		737-7ZH				
ZM	Belavia		737-8ZM				
ZN	AeroLogic						777-FZN
ZQ	Tassili Airlines		737-8ZQ				
ZS	S7 Airlines		737-8ZS				
ZV	Worldwide Aircraft Holding Company			747-8ZV			
ZW	Digong Duterte Airways / Jingchen Group		737-7ZW				
ZX	Hangar 8 AOC Malta/Maleth-Aero		737-7ZX				
ZY	Mexican Air Force						

== Bibliography ==
- Pither, Tony (1998). The Boeing 707, 720 and C-135. England: Air-Britain (Historians) Ltd. ISBN 0-85130-236-X.
- Bowers, Peter M. (1968). Boeing Aircraft Since 1916 (2nd ed.). Naval Institute Pres. ISBN 0-87021-037-8.
