= Hawaiian Express =

Hawaiian Express may refer to:

- Pineapple Express, a meteorological phenomenon
- The Hawaii Express, a defunct airline
