= XAH =

XAH may refer to:

- Mid East Jet, the ICAO code XAH
- xah, the ISO 639 code for Ngaju language
