= Air Hawaii =

Airline of the United States (1985–1986)

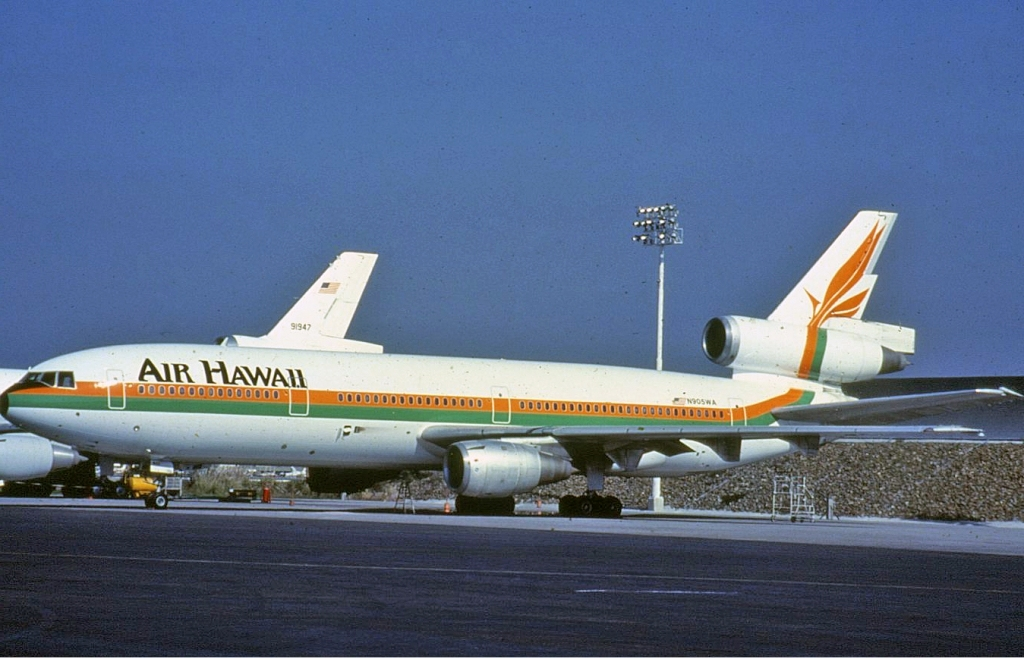
- Air Hawaii McDonnell Douglas DC-10 N905WA at Oakland San Francisco Bay Airport in 1983
IATA	ICAO	Call sign
XK	AHC	AIR HAWAII
- Commenced operations: November 22, 1985
- Ceased operations: February 19, 1986
- Operating bases: Daniel K. Inouye International Airport
- Fleet size: 2
- Destinations: 3
- Parent company: Airwest International, Inc.
- Headquarters: Honolulu, Hawaii
- Key people: Michael J. Hartley

Air Hawaii was a short-lived scheduled passenger airline providing service between Honolulu and the U.S. West Coast cities of Los Angeles and San Francisco. The airline advertised its service as "High Class. Low Fares." Founded by Michael J. Hartley, who previously started The Hawaii Express and would later co-found CheapTickets, Air Hawaii began operations between Honolulu and Los Angeles on November 22, 1985, and added service between San Francisco in December. The airline almost immediately ran into financial problems and discontinued operations on February 19, 1986.

There were also two other airlines which used the name Air Hawaii respectively in 1968 and 1981 with both air carriers operating inter-island commuter flights in Hawaii with small turboprop and prop aircraft.

== Destinations ==
Air Hawaii served three destinations in the United States:

- Honolulu – Daniel K. Inouye International Airport
- Los Angeles – Los Angeles International Airport
- San Francisco – San Francisco International Airport

== Fleet ==
Air Hawaii operated two McDonnell Douglas DC-10-10 aircraft. Both of these planes had previously operated for Michael Hartley's previous venture, The Hawaii Express.

- N904WA cn/ln: 46930/112 delivered: 13 January 1986
- N905WA cn/ln: 46938/153 delivered: 20 November 1985

== See also ==
- List of defunct airlines of the United States
