= Avianca Costa Rica =

Flag carrier of Costa Rica

Avianca Costa Rica S.A.
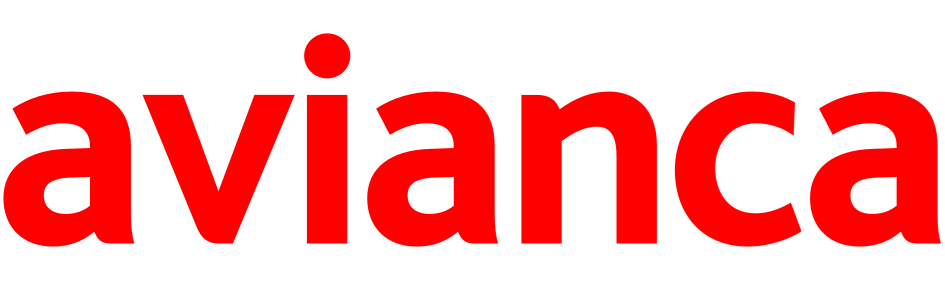

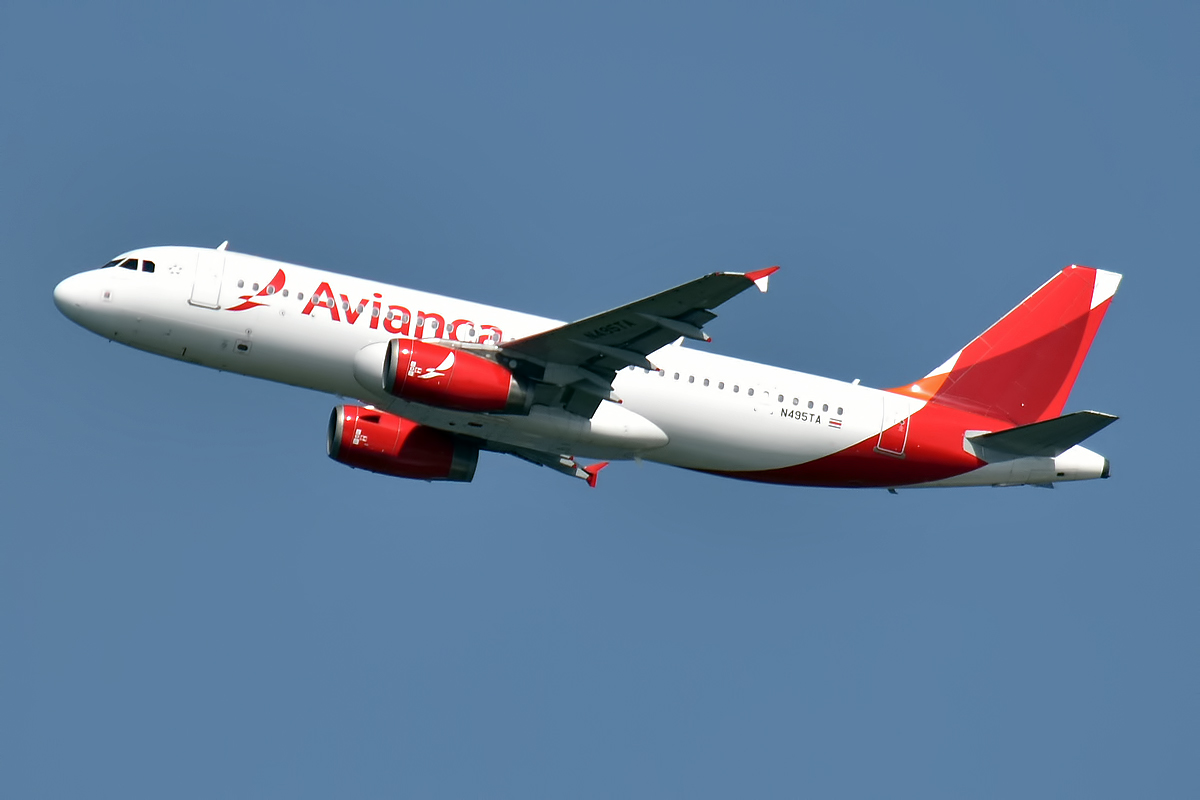
IATA	ICAO	Call sign
LR	LRC	LACSA
- Founded: October 17, 1945; 81 years ago (as LACSA)
- Commenced operations: June 1, 1946; 80 years ago
- Hubs: Juan Santamaría International Airport
- Frequent-flyer program: LifeMiles
- Alliance: Star Alliance (affiliate)
- Fleet size: 6
- Destinations: 20
- Parent company: Avianca Group
- Headquarters: San José, Costa Rica
- Key people: Frederico Pedreira (CEO of Avianca Group); David Aleman (director)
- Employees: 1,164 (2017)
- Website: www.avianca.com

Avianca Costa Rica S.A., using callsign as LACSA (Spanish: Lineas Aéreas Costarricenses S.A.), minority owned by the Synergy Group, is the national airline of Costa Rica and is based in San José. It operates international scheduled services to over 35 destinations in Central, North and South America. The airline previously used the TACA/LACSA moniker when it was a subsidiary of Grupo TACA. Since May 2013, following Avianca's purchase of Grupo TACA, Avianca Costa Rica became one of seven nationally branded airlines (Avianca Ecuador, Avianca El Salvador, etc.) operated by Avianca Group of Latin American airlines.

== History ==
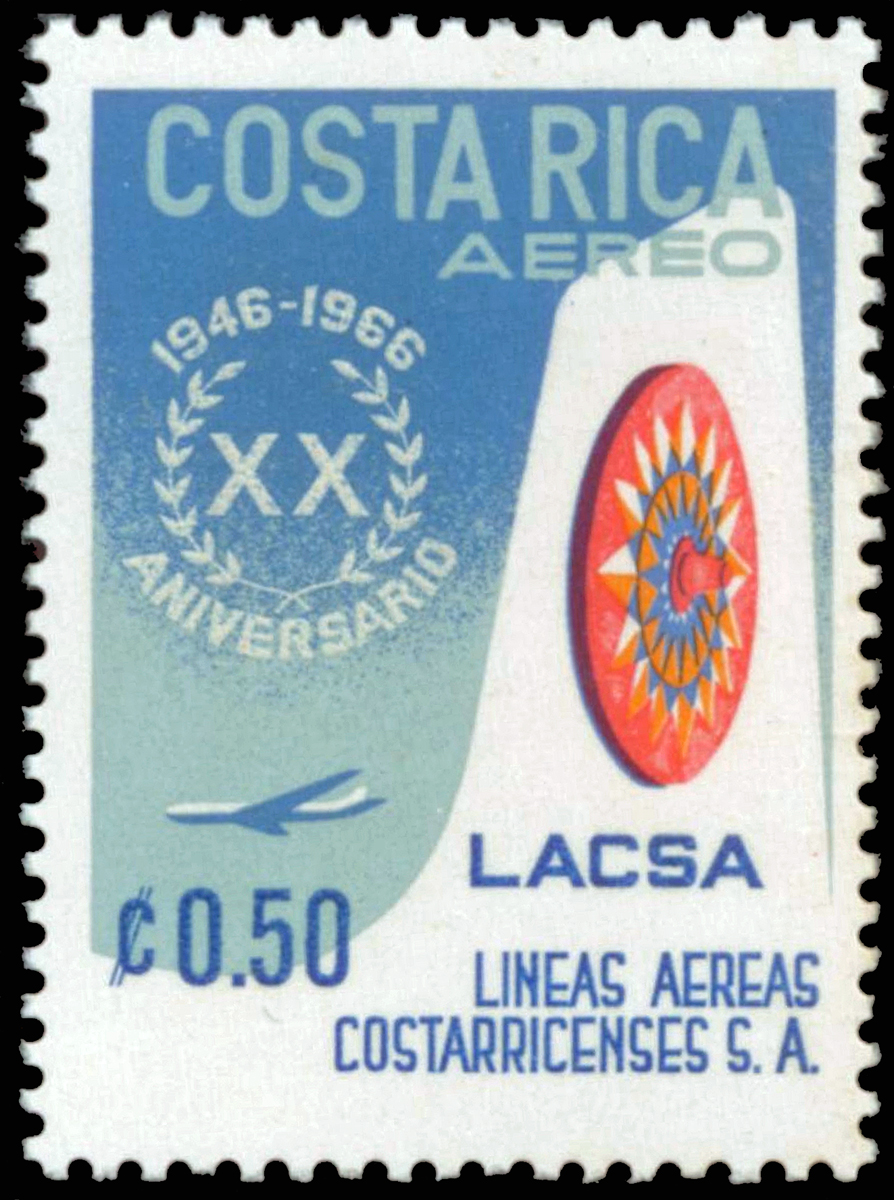
A postage stamp issued to commemorate LACSA’s 20th anniversary

LACSA was formed on October 17, 1945, with the help of Pan American World Airways, and started operations on June 1, 1946, using Douglas DC-3s for local services within Costa Rica, operating as an affiliate of Pan Am. The airline was designated as Costa Rica's Flag carrier in 1949 and was nationalized in 1958.

LACSA operated the Douglas DC-6B four-engined piston airliner from 1960 until 1976 on their regular passenger, and eventually freight, scheduled flights to Miami International Airport. The airline introduced the first of their BAC One-Eleven twin-engined jet airliners onto their Caribbean passenger route network in April 1967.

The airline also operated a subsidiary in the Cayman Islands, Cayman Brac Airways (CBA) Ltd., which it sold a 51% controlling interest in the late 1960s to the Cayman Islands government, which in turn used the air carrier to form Cayman Airways. LACSA served Grand Cayman for many years as an intermediate stop on its services between San José, Costa Rica and Miami.

Beginning in 1998, TACA/LACSA was one of the member airlines comprising the TACA Airlines alliance along with Aviateca, Nica, Isleña Airlines, and five other regional airlines. In 2008, a new fleet of Embraer 190 jets was introduced. Also in 2008 a new TACA logo was introduced, followed by a new fleet of Embraer 190 airplanes registered in Costa Rica and operated under the LACSA code. In October 2009, Avianca and TACA announced their merger plans to be completed in 2010. By May 28, 2013, the airlines began operating as a single commercial brand using the Avianca name.

On May 10, 2020, Avianca filed for Chapter 11 bankruptcy in the United States after failing to pay bondholders, becoming one of the major airlines to file for bankruptcy due to the COVID-19 pandemic crisis.

== Destinations ==
Avianca Costa Rica serves the following destinations:

Country	City	Airport	Notes	Refs
Argentina	Buenos Aires	Ministro Pistarini International Airport		
Brazil	Brasília	Brasília International Airport	Terminated	
Brazil	Rio de Janeiro	Rio de Janeiro/Galeão International Airport	Terminated	
Canada	Toronto	Toronto Pearson International Airport		
Canada	Montreal	Montréal–Trudeau International Airport		
Chile	Santiago	Arturo Merino Benítez International Airport	Terminated	
Colombia	Bogotá	El Dorado International Airport		
Colombia	Cartagena	Rafael Núñez International Airport		
Colombia	Medellín	José María Córdova International Airport		
Costa Rica	San José	Juan Santamaría International Airport	Hub	
Cuba	Havana	José Martí International Airport	Terminated	
Dominican Republic	Santo Domingo	Las Américas International Airport	Terminated	
Ecuador	Guayaquil	José Joaquín de Olmedo International Airport		
Ecuador	Quito	Mariscal Sucre International Airport		
El Salvador	San Salvador	El Salvador International Airport		
Guatemala	Guatemala City	La Aurora International Airport		
Honduras	San Pedro Sula	Ramón Villeda Morales International Airport	Seasonal	
Mexico	Cancún	Cancún International Airport		
Mexico	Mexico City	Mexico City International Airport		
Nicaragua	Managua	Augusto C. Sandino International Airport	Terminated	
Panama	Panama City	Tocumen International Airport	Terminated	
Peru	Lima	Jorge Chávez International Airport		
Puerto Rico	San Juan	Luis Muñoz Marín International Airport		
United States	Chicago	O'Hare International Airport	Seasonal	
United States	Los Angeles	Los Angeles International Airport		
United States	Miami	Miami International Airport		
United States	New York City	John F. Kennedy International Airport		
United States	Orlando	Orlando International Airport	Terminated	
United States	Washington, D.C.	Dulles International Airport		
Venezuela	Caracas	Simón Bolívar International Airport	Terminated	

=== LACSA international destinations in 1973 ===
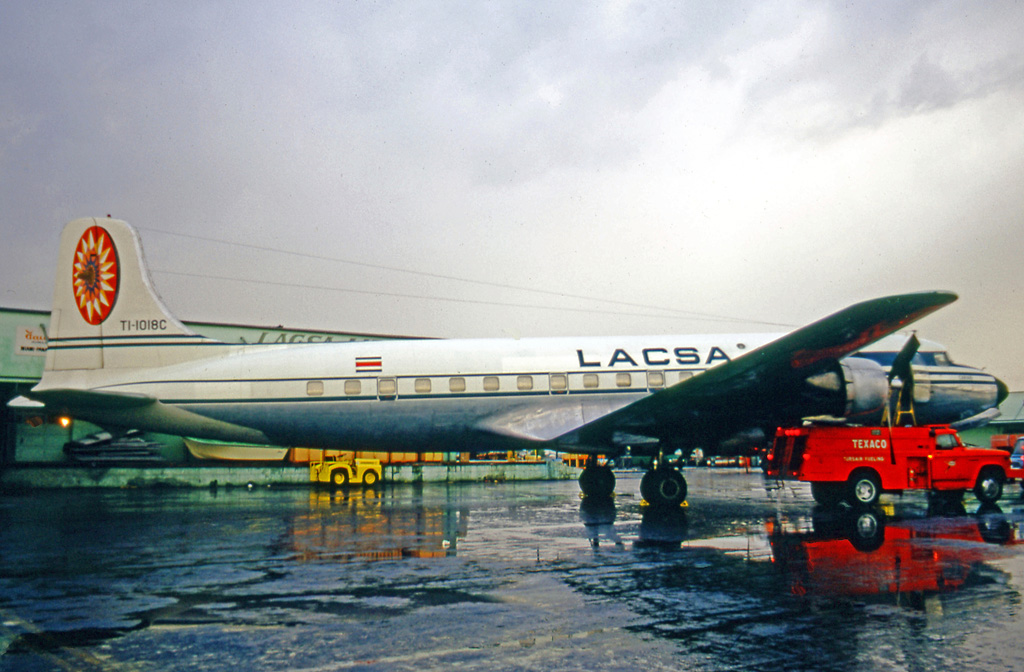
LACSA Douglas DC-6B freighter at Miami International Airport in 1971

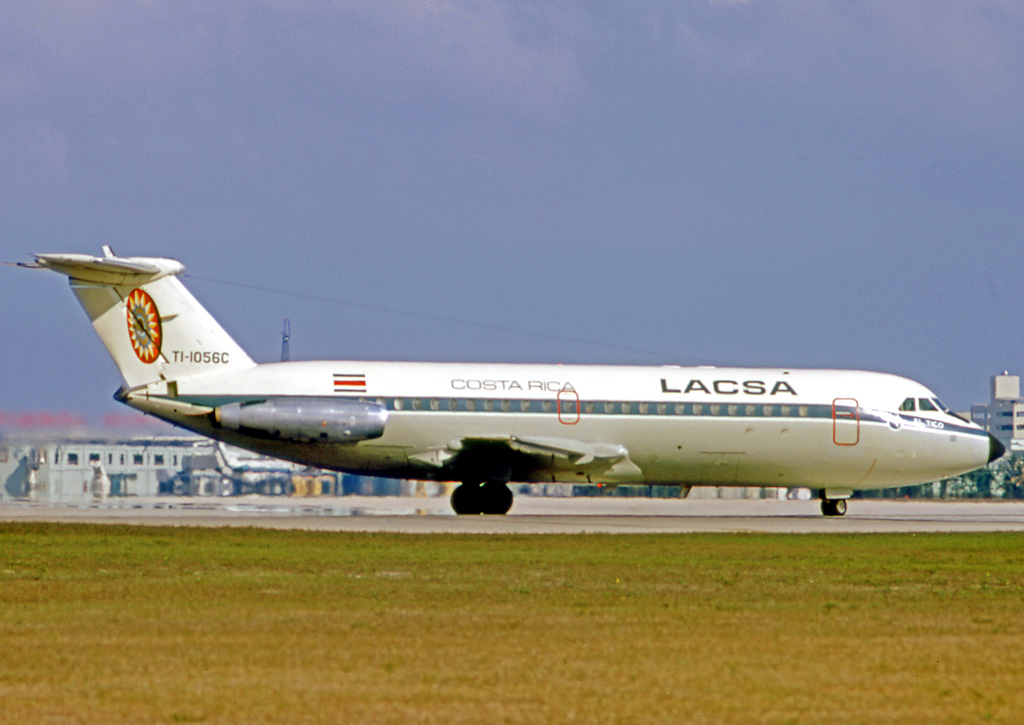
LACSA BAC One-Eleven taxiing at Miami International Airport in 1971

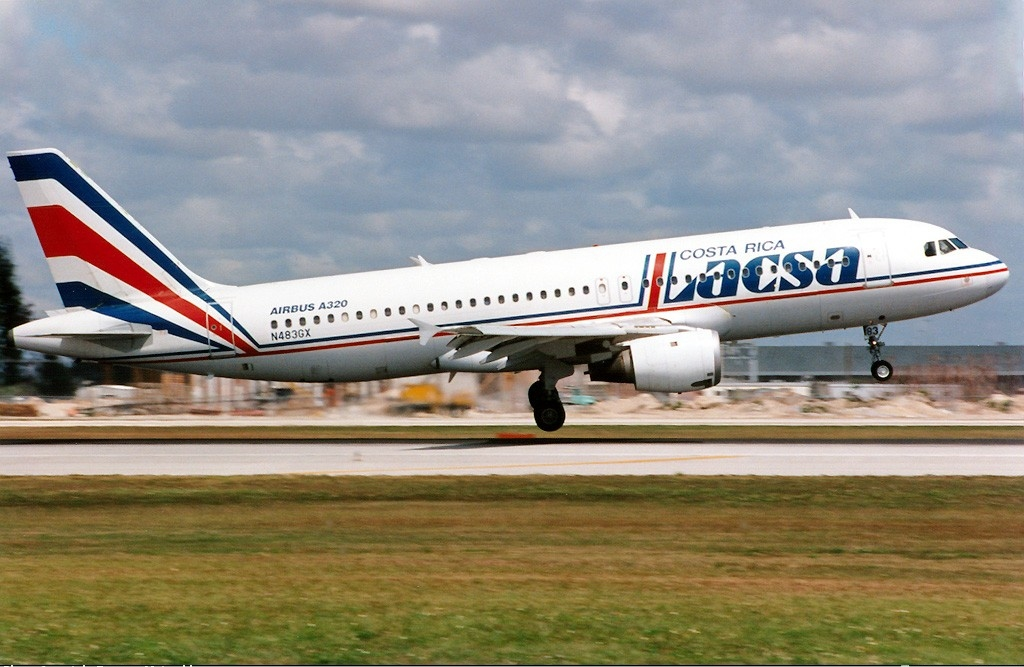
Classic LACSA livery of the 1990s, shown on an Airbus A320

According to the May 31, 1973 LACSA system timetable, the airline was serving the following international destinations:

- Barranquilla, Colombia
- Caracas, Venezuela
- Grand Cayman, Cayman Islands
- Maracaibo, Venezuela
- Mexico City, Mexico
- Miami, Florida
- Panama City, Panama
- San Andres Island, Colombia
- San José, Costa Rica - Hub
- San Salvador, El Salvador

This same timetable states that all international flights were being operated with British Aircraft Corporation BAC One-Eleven twin jets at this time with the exception of the San José-San Andres Island route which was being flown with a Convair 440 propliner.

=== International routes in 1984 ===
The airline was operating to such international destinations in 1984 as:

- Barranquilla, Colombia
- Cancún, Mexico
- Caracas, Venezuela
- Guatemala City, Guatemala
- Guayaquil, Ecuador
- Los Angeles, USA
- Maracaibo, Venezuela
- Mexico City, Mexico
- Miami, USA
- New Orleans, USA
- Panama City, Panama
- Quito, Ecuador
- Rio de Janeiro, Brazil
- San Juan, Puerto Rico
- San Salvador, El Salvador

These cities were flown to using LACSA’s Boeing 727.

== Fleet ==
=== Current fleet ===
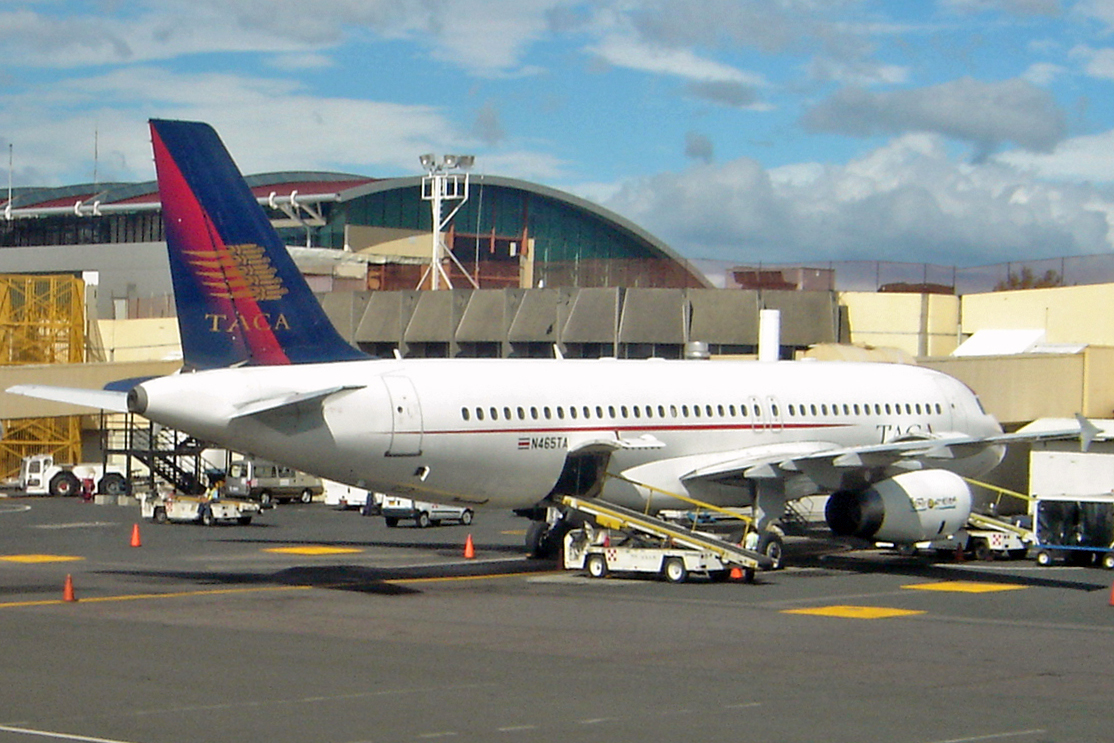
A TACA/LACSA Airbus A320-200 at Juan Santamaría International Airport in 2005. This aircraft would crash as Flight 390 in 2008.

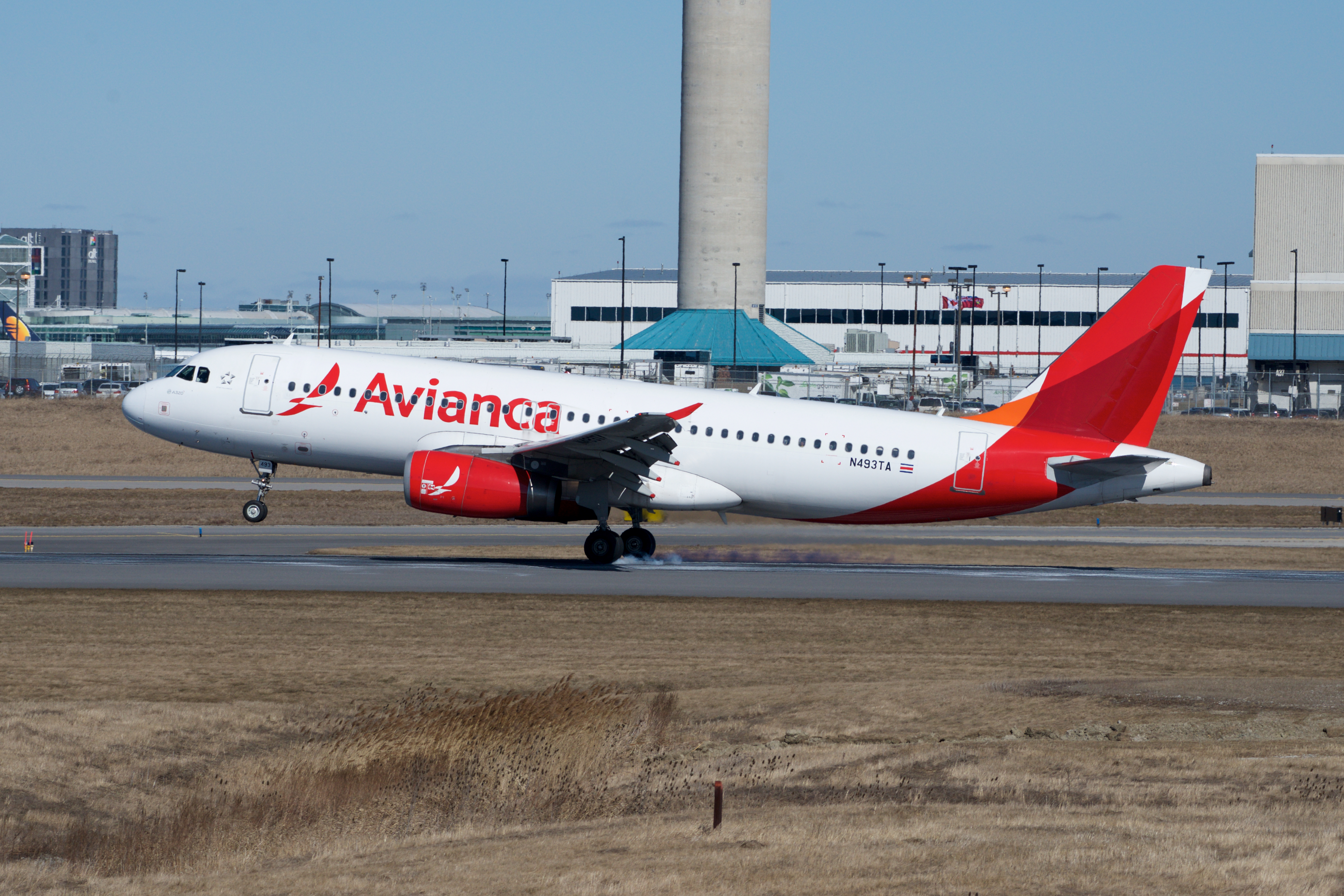
An Avianca Costa Rica Airbus A320-200 landing at Toronto Pearson International Airport in 2018

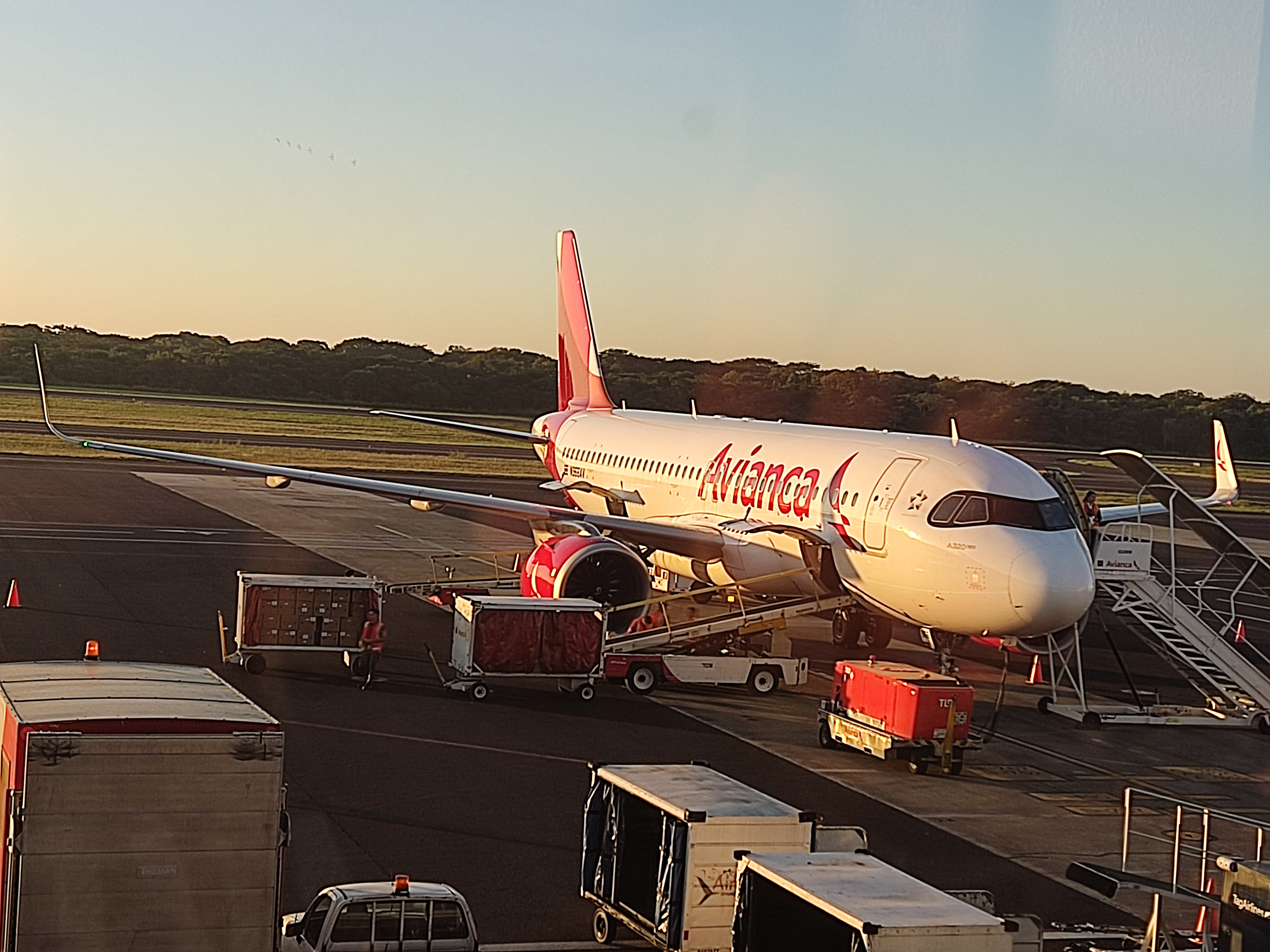
An Avianca Costa Rica Airbus A320neo (N966AV) at El Salvador International Airport in 2023.

As of July 2026, Avianca Costa Rica operates the following aircraft:

Avianca Costa Rica fleet
Aircraft	In service	Orders	Passengers				Notes
Aircraft	In service	Orders	W	Y+	Y	Total	Notes
Airbus A320neo	6	—					
Total	6	—					

=== Former fleet ===
As of June 2024, Avianca Costa Rica operated 1 Airbus A320 and 3 Airbus A320neo

LACSA operated the following aircraft:

Avianca Costa Rica former fleet
Aircraft	Total	Introduced	Retired	Notes
Airbus A319-100	3	2007	2022	
Airbus A321-200	2	2009	2021	
BAC One-Eleven	6	1967	1982	
Beechcraft 18	1	1965	1976	
Boeing 707-320C	1	1985	1986	Leased from Jet 24
Boeing 727-100	3	1987	1992	
Boeing 727-200	5	1979	1994	
Boeing 737-200	8	1992	2004	
CASA C-212 Aviocar	1	1993	1995	
Convair CV-340	3	1955	1962	
Convair CV-440	2	1972	1977	
Curtiss C-46 Commando	6	1948	1979	
Douglas C-47 Skytrain	6	1945	1961	
Douglas DC-3	2	1946	1959	
Douglas DC-6B	2	1960	1977	
Douglas DC-8-21F	1	1981	1982	Leased from General Air Services Inc.
Douglas DC-8-55CF	3	1982	1991	
Douglas DC-8-62F	1	1986	1987	Leased from Jet 24
Embraer 190AR	4	2008	2012	
Lockheed L-188CF Electra	3	1976	1981	

== Accidents and incidents ==
- On 23 May 1988, LACSA Flight 628, a leased Boeing 727-100 (registered TI-LRC), operating the route San José-Managua-Miami, collided with a fence at the end of the runway in the Juan Santamaría International Airport, crashed at a nearby field next to a highway, and caught fire. The excess of weight in the front part of the airplane was the cause of the accident. There were no fatalities out of the 24 occupants.
- On 11 January 1998, LACSA flight 691, an Airbus A320-200, veered off a runway at San Francisco International Airport during the takeoff roll. The aircraft left the runway at full speed, coming to rest in a field of mud. The runway was closed after the incident, reducing take-off capacity by 50 percent, leading to massive delays at the airport. None of the 122 passengers on board the aircraft sustained injuries, and stayed at a hotel until another aircraft could transport them to their destination, San José, Costa Rica. The cause of the incident was not determined.

== See also ==
- List of airlines of Costa Rica
