= Jet 24 =

Jet 24 International Airways
IATA	ICAO	Call sign
TJ	JCS	-
- Founded: August 1979; 47 years ago
- Commenced operations: December 1981; 44 years ago
- Ceased operations: October 1985; 40 years ago
- Hubs: Miami International Airport
- Fleet size: 10
- Destinations: 5
- Headquarters: Miami, Florida, United States

Jet 24 International Airways Inc. was an American airline based in Miami, operating from 1979 until its demise in 1985.

== History ==
The history of Jet 24 began as Jet Charter Service in August 1979 and began services in December 1981, with freighters only between Miami and Caracas using a Boeing 707-320C. Two more 707s were later acquired and then in 1983, Jet 24 received permission to fly passenger charter flights; two McDonnell Douglas DC-10s were acquired for charter flights to South America and Europe.

Scheduled services began in May 1985 with routes from Miami to San Juan and Madrid, and later Paris and Zurich were added. But Jet 24's financial situation deteriorated rapidly and by August 1985, the company went into Chapter 11 bankruptcy protection. By October 1985 there was no money to continue operating and later ceased to exist.

== Scheduled destinations ==
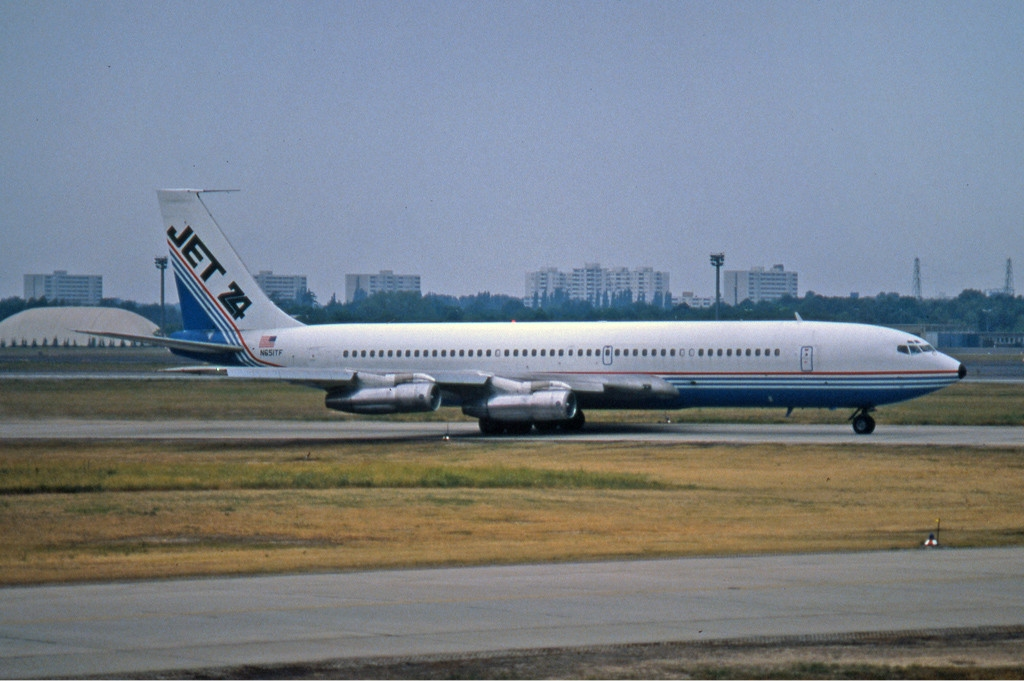
A Jet 24 Boeing 707-320C taxiing at Berlin Tegel Airport in 1982

France

- Paris - Charles de Gaulle Airport

Puerto Rico

- San Juan - Luis Muñoz Marín International Airport

Spain

- Madrid - Adolfo Suárez Madrid–Barajas Airport

Switzerland

- Zurich - Zurich Airport

United States

- Miami - Miami International Airport Hub

== Fleet ==
Jet 24 operated the following aircraft:

- 5 Boeing 707-320C
- 3 Boeing 720B
- 1 Boeing 747-100
- 1 Douglas DC-8-62F (Leased to LACSA)
- 2 McDonnell Douglas DC-10-40

== See also ==
- List of defunct airlines of the United States
