= Novair International Airways =

British charter airline (1988–1990)

Novair

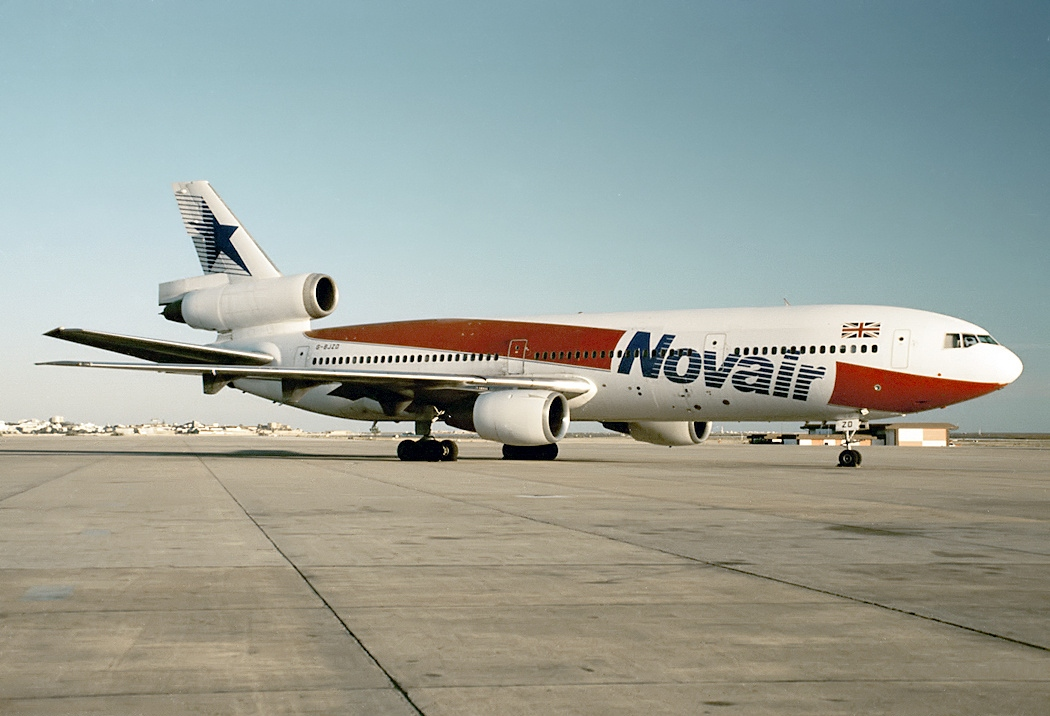
- McDonnell Douglas DC-10-10
IATA	ICAO	Call sign
EN	NGK	STARJET
- Founded: December 1988 (previously Cal air Int.)
- Ceased operations: May 1990
- Operating bases: London Gatwick Airport; Manchester Airport
- Fleet size: 6
- Destinations: Mediterranean; North America
- Parent company: Rank Organisation
- Headquarters: London Gatwick Airport
- Key people: Frank Hope

Novair International Airways Ltd. was a British charter airline that operated between 1988 and 1990. It was the former Cal Air International with a new name.

== History ==
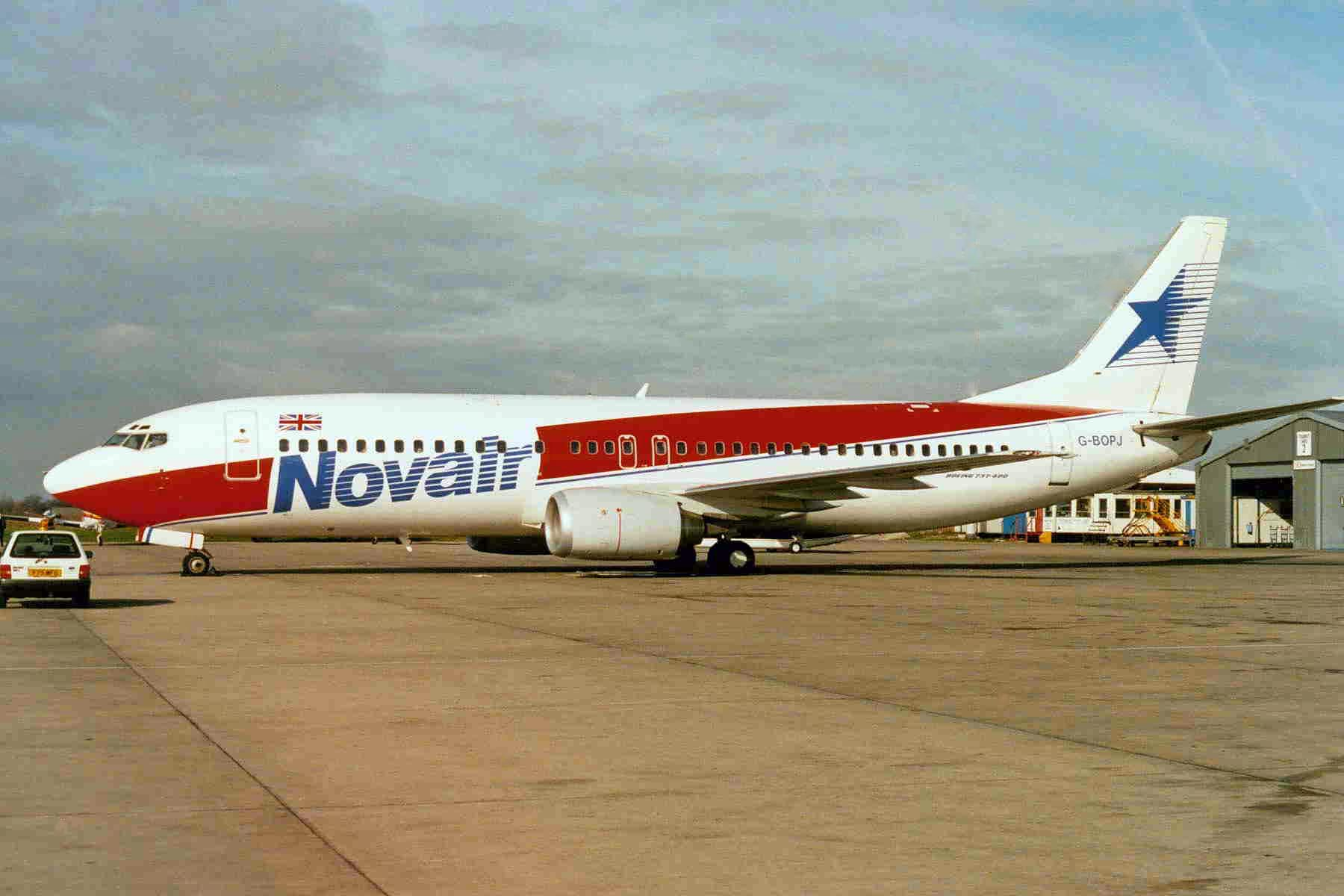
Boeing 737-400

Novair International Airways was established on 7 December 1988 following the renaming of Cal Air International by the Rank Organisation. The livery was adapted slightly to take in the new name and a huge shooting blue star was emblazoned on the tail fin. Perhaps the main reason for this new name was the acquisition of British Caledonian by their main competitor British Airways. BA's aim was to form a new charter subsidiary under the name of Caledonian Airways (1988). The renewed air carrier went on to add three brand new Boeing 737-400 to its fleet of three DC-10s deploying them at its Manchester and Glasgow bases.

The airline flew charter flights to the popular Mediterranean, North African & Canary Islands as well as long haul services to Orlando & Fort Lauderdale Florida North America & Banjul West Africa. However it was always fighting against decreasing passenger numbers in addition to the Rank Organisation losing interest in its travel/aviation subsidiaries. The company stopped operating and subsequently closed its doors for good on 31 March 1990 after the Rank Organisation could not find a suitable buyer. Both McDonnell Douglas DC-10-10s went to FedEx Express while the third one was transformed into an eye diseases hospital for Orbis International. Some of the Boeing 737-400s went to British Midland International. The airline was finally wound up on 5 May and dissolved in April 2012 according to data from Companies House.

== Livery ==
A predominantly white body with a red sash-like diagonal stripe incorporating large "Novair" titling. The tail logo had a large blue 5 pointed star stylised for speed.

== Fleet ==
Novair operated six aircraft during its two years of operation consisting of three McDonnell Douglas DC-10s inherited from Cal Air International. These were joined by three Boeing 737s.

== See also ==
- List of defunct airlines of the United Kingdom
