= The Hawaii Express =

1980s scheduled passenger airline

IATA	ICAO	Call sign
LP	HEA	"PINEAPPLE"
- Founded: 1982; 44 years ago
- Commenced operations: August 20, 1982; 44 years ago
- Ceased operations: December 20, 1983; 42 years ago
- Operating bases: Los Angeles International Airport (LAX)
- Fleet size: See Fleet below
- Destinations: See Destinations below
- Headquarters: Los Angeles, California, U.S.

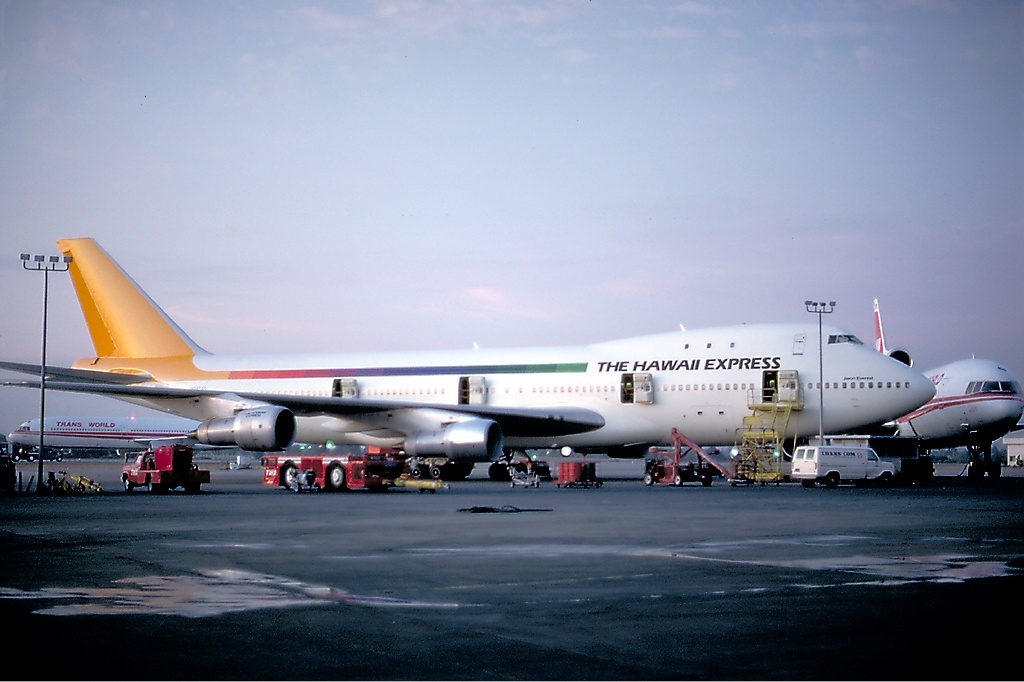
The Hawaii Express' Boeing 747

The Hawaii Express (IATA: LP, ICAO: HEA) was a scheduled passenger airline that operated flights between Los Angeles, California (LAX) and Honolulu, Hawaii (HNL). It was nicknamed "The Big Pineapple" and started service with one Boeing 747-100 aircraft, featuring a unique and detailed paint job with a mango-colored tail and a rainbow-colored stripe down the side.

== History ==
Founded by Michael Hartley, who would later go on to found Air Hawaii and CheapTickets, the airline began flights on August 20, 1982. The vice-president of Operations was William Traver. Since the airline wanted to hire personnel with airline experience, the employment ad which ran in the airlines section of Los Angeles Times newspaper classified ads in the spring of 1982 listed previous 747 qualification as a requirement. The airline's original crew members included fifteen pilots, most of whom were from the recently bankrupted Braniff Airlines based in Dallas, Texas, while the original fifty flight attendants were furloughed from various major airlines in the United States. Four of those fifty flight attendants served as permanent pursers/First Flight Attendants. All crew members were based at Los Angeles International Airport with maintenance and gate facilities provided by TWA.

Hawaii Express acquired two McDonnell Douglas DC-10-10 aircraft from World Airways in May 1983 to replace the 747. The aircraft were configurated and repainted at the World Air Center at Oakland International Airport. Although all three aircraft were operated simultaneously for a while. The Hawaii Express suspended flights on December 20 of that year and filed for bankruptcy the following day.

== Destinations ==
According to The Hawaii Express August 1983 timetable, the airline was operating three daily round trip flights between the following cities:

- Los Angeles - Los Angeles International Airport (LAX) - Home base for the airline
- Honolulu - Honolulu International Airport (HNL)

== Fleet ==
The airline operated the following wide body jetliner types during its existence:

- Boeing 747-143 (N355AS)
- McDonnell Douglas DC-10-10 (N904WA & N905WA)

== See also ==
- List of defunct airlines of the United States
