= Mid East Jet =

Saudi charter airline

| IATA | ICAO | Call sign |
|---|---|---|
| - | XAH | - |
- Founded: 1990; 36 years ago
- Fleet size: 7
- Destinations: Charter
- Headquarters: Jeddah, Saudi Arabia

Mid East Jet Saudi Arabia Limited, doing business as Mid East Jet, is a charter airline based in Jeddah, Saudi Arabia. It is a privately owned premium class airline operating domestic and international scheduled and charter services. Its main base is King Abdulaziz International Airport, Jeddah, with several other sister companies. As of 2013 it was one of seven Saudi-based airline companies.

== Fleet ==
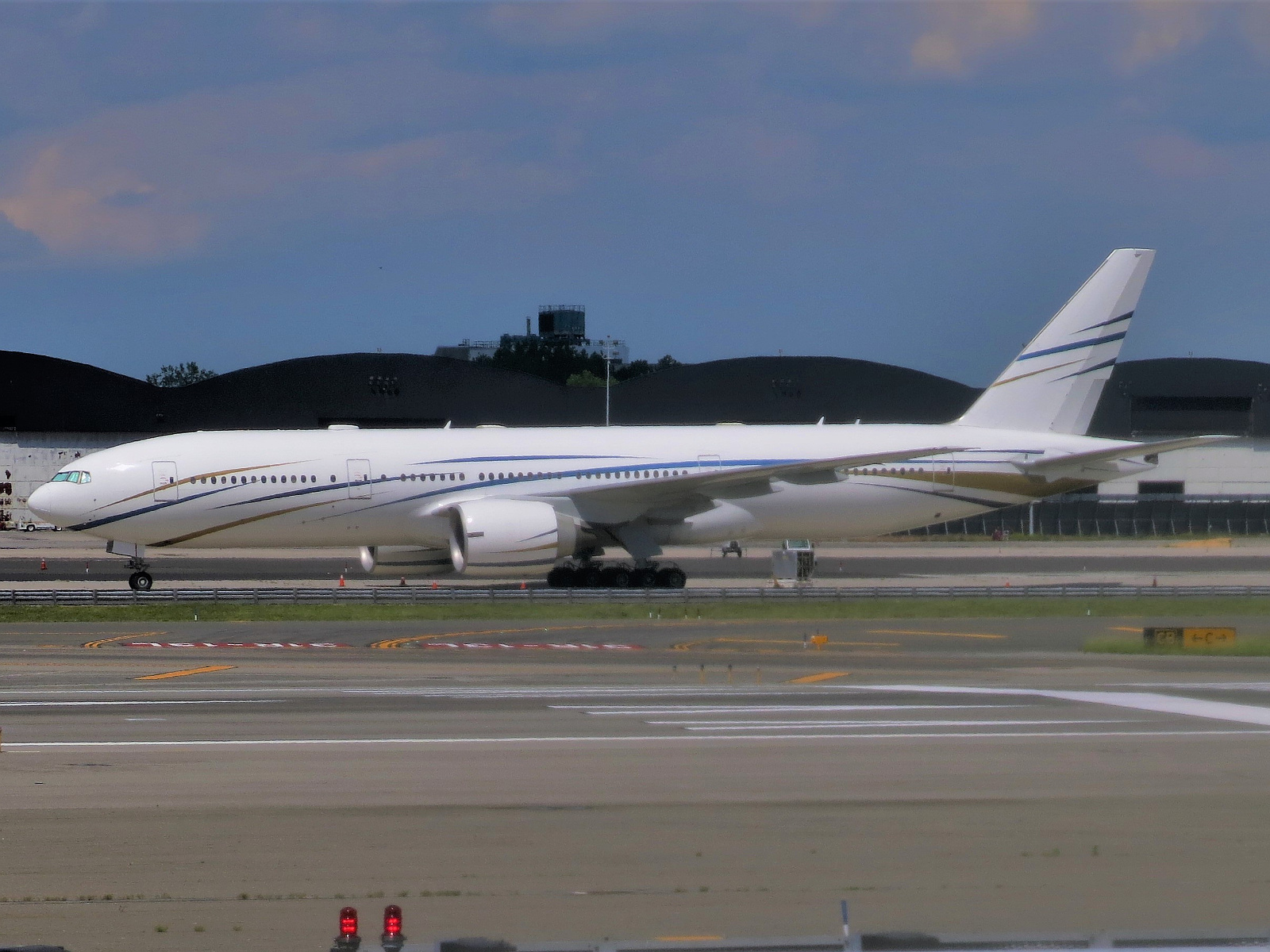
A Mid East Jet Boeing 777-200ER at New York-JFK Airport

The Mid East Jet fleet consists of the following aircraft (as of June 2017):

Mid East Jet fleet
| Aircraft | In fleet | Notes |
|---|---|---|
| Airbus A318-100 CJ | 1 | |
| Boeing 737-800 BBJ2 | 2 | Winglet equipped |
| Boeing 737-900ER BBJ3 | 1 | Winglet equipped |
| Boeing 757-200 | 1 | |
| Bombardier Challenger 600 | 1 | |
| Boeing 777-200ER | 1 | |
| Total | 7 | |

The airline fleet previously included the following aircraft (as of 28 June 2010):

- 1 Airbus A319-100 (operated by Masterjet)
- 1 McDonnell Douglas MD-11

== See also ==
- List of airlines of Saudi Arabia
