= Cal Air International =

Airline of the United Kingdom (1985–1988)

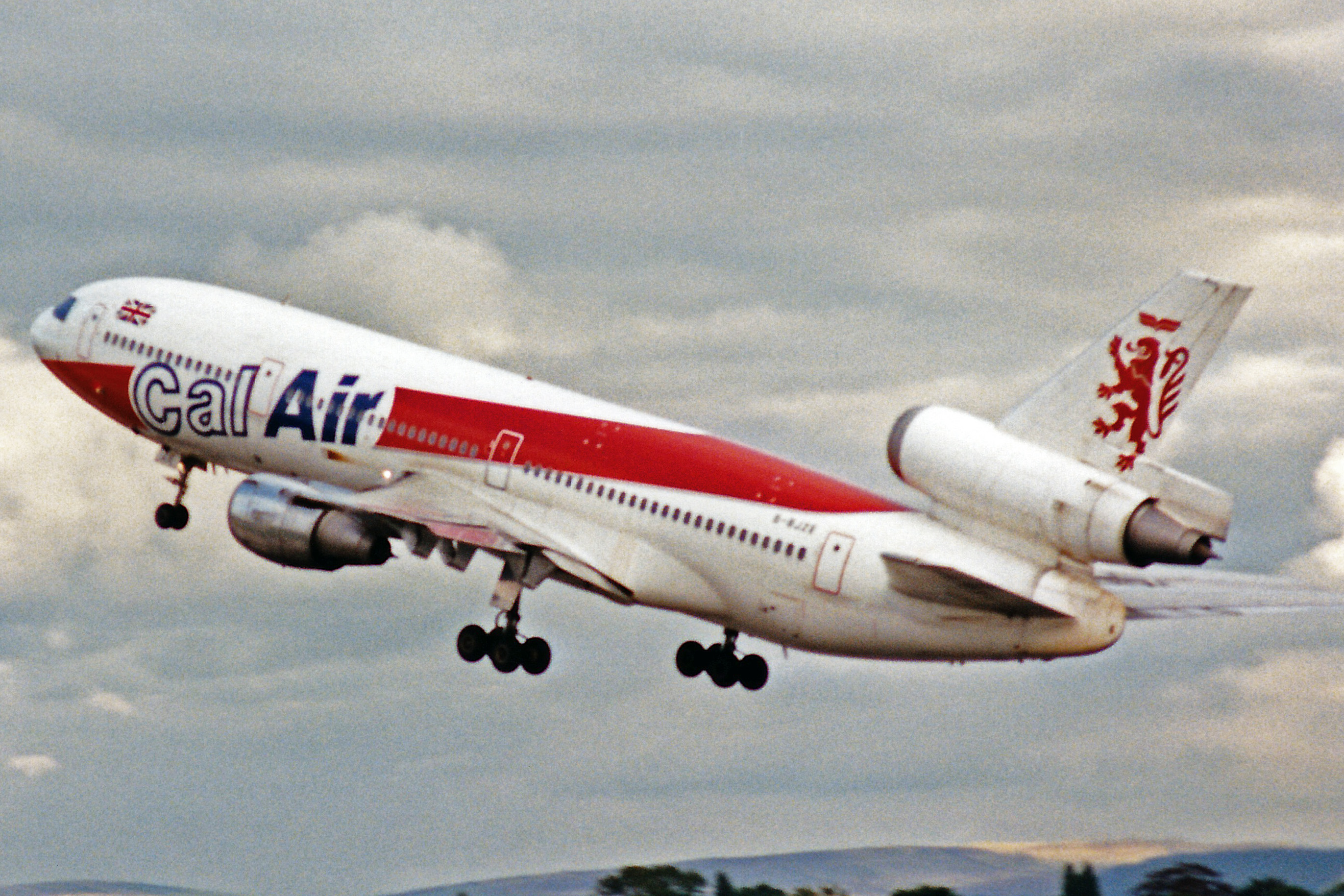
- Douglas DC-10-10
IATA	ICAO	Call sign
CAI	EN	CALJET
- Founded: 1972 (registered in 1982)
- Commenced operations: March 1983
- Ceased operations: 1990 (as Novair Int. Airways)
- Operating bases: London–Gatwick; Manchester
- Fleet size: 3
- Parent company: British Caledonian (50%); Rank Organisation (50%)
- Headquarters: Gatwick Airport
- Key people: Frank Hope; Mike Leigh

Cal Air International was a charter airline in the United Kingdom that operated from 1985 until 1988.

== History ==
The air carrier was initially conceived in early 1982 after the sudden demise of Laker Airways which had left a large gap in the UK Inclusive tour/charter market. The airline was a joint set up between British Caledonian and the Rank Organisation which already had its interests firmly established in the travel industry with its own tour operators: Blue Sky Travel/Holidays, Wings Holidays, Ellerman Travel and OSL Holidays.

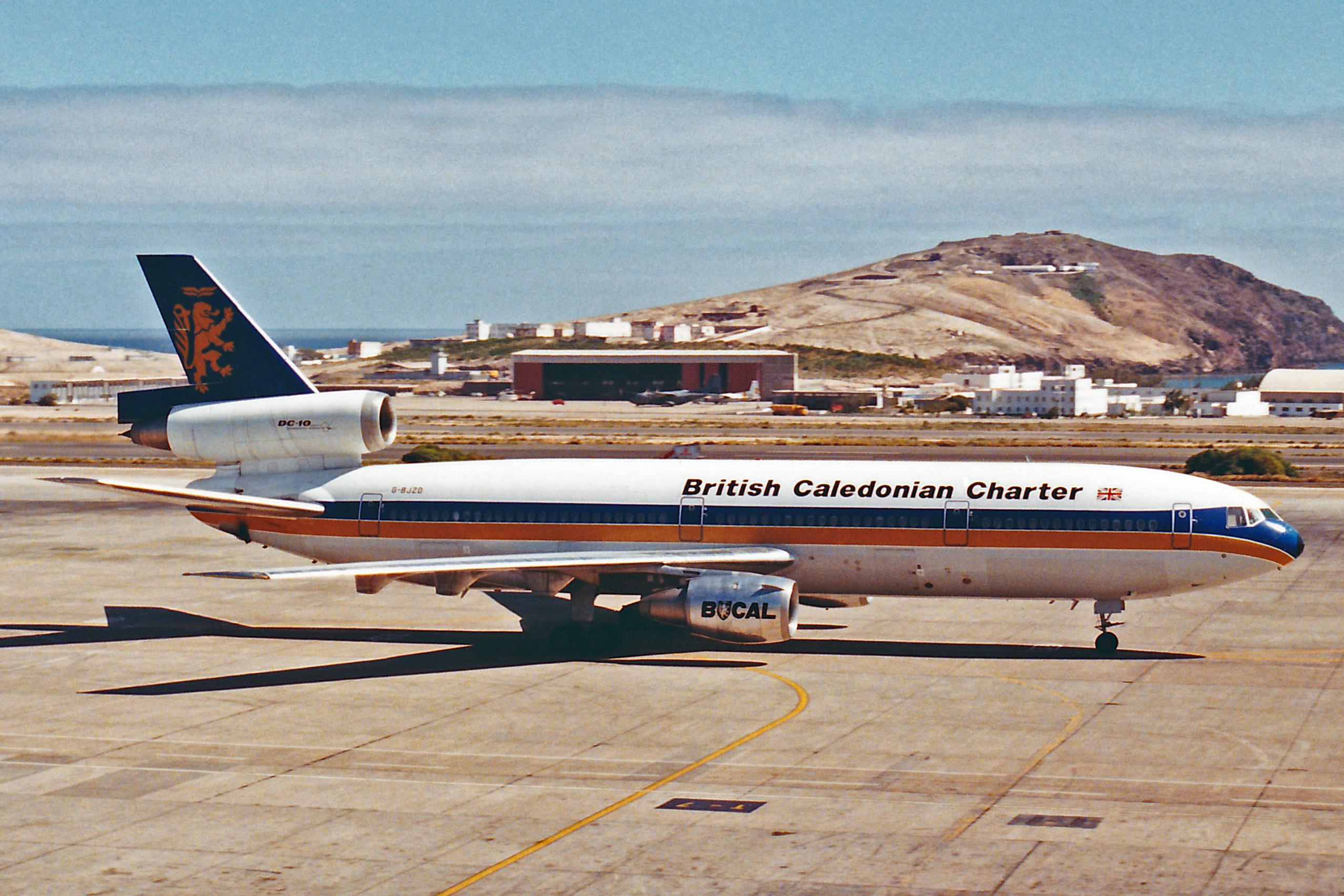
Douglas DC-10-10

British Caledonian (Charter) Ltd. was established at the very end of 1982 and had exactly the same livery as its parent British Caledonian. Two ex Laker Airways/Skytrain DC-10-10s were acquired along with many highly experienced ex Laker Airways pilots, flight engineers and flight attendants. The DC-10s were re-registered as G-BJZE and G-BJZD. Flight operations were started in the spring of the following year.

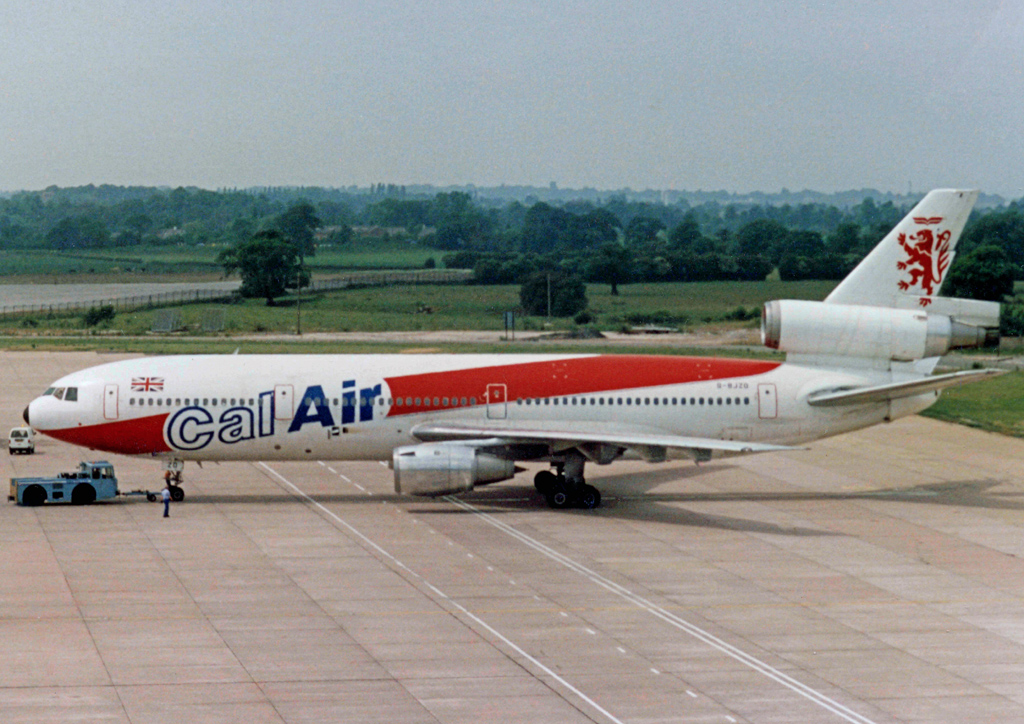
Douglas DC-10-10 at Manchester Airport in 1988

However it was not long before British Caledonian realised that its own high quality scheduled product and image was being somewhat tarnished by the more utility charter product in addition to the general public not being able to differentiate between the two companies, even the charter cabin crew all wore identical tartan uniforms to those of the parent company. It was therefore decided to make slight changes to the charter company and livery by introducing 'BCA Charter' decals to the aircraft and outlining the golden St Andrews lion rampant tail logo with a white shield. This lasted only a short time when a radical step was taken between the Rank Organisation and BCAL to completely rename the charter arm as Cal Air International. This saw the introduction of a striking bold livery never seen in the UK at the time.

Cal Air's DC-10s were mainly used on UK charter flights to the usual popular Mediterranean resorts, North Africa and the Canary Islands. Long haul destinations included Orlando & Tampa (Florida), Los Angeles (USA), Caribbean, Toronto & Vancouver (Canada), and Gambia and Kenya in Africa. A third ex Laker Airways DC-10-10 was acquired in 1986 and re-registered G-GCAL. Occasional ad hoc charter work was also undertaken which saw the companies DC-10s flying to destinations all over the world.

In 1988 British Caledonian was bought by and merged into British Airways. Cal Air International was of no interest to British Airways. The Rank Organisation decided to buy the other 50% share of the company making it the wholly owned subsidiary. This created a problem as the name Cal Air International along with the lion rampant logo in red and its female flight attendants wearing tartan uniforms, was too close in image and style to the new start up British Airways charter airline Caledonian Airways which was now the new face and product of what had been known for many years as British Airtours. It was decided that the company would change its name and livery yet again. Various names were seriously considered including 'Bel Air' and 'Phoenix International Airlines'. However, it was Novair International Airways Ltd. that won the vote and was officially adopted on 7 December 1988.

== Livery ==
A predominantly white body with a red sash-like diagonal stripe incorporating large "Cal Air" titling. The tail logo had a large British Caledonian style Scottish Lion Rampant in red.

== Fleet ==
Cal Air International operated three aircraft in its three years of operation consisting of two ex-Laker Airways McDonnell Douglas DC-10-10s: G-BJZD and G-BJZE. A third DC-10 was acquired in February 1986 G-GCAL. Orders were also placed for 3 MD-80s but these were never fulfilled.

== See also ==
- List of defunct airlines of the United Kingdom
