= List of defunct airlines of Zimbabwe =

This is a list of defunct airlines of Zimbabwe.

Airline	Image	IATA	ICAO	Callsign	Commenced operations	Ceased operations	Notes
Affretair		ZL	AFM	AFRO	1970	2001	
Afro Continental Airways					1970	1979	renamed/merged to: Affretair
Air Rhodesia		RH		RHODESIA	1967	1979	renamed/merged to: Air Zimbabwe Rhodesia
Air Trans Africa		AG		Transaf	1964	2000	renamed/merged to: Affretair
Air Zambezi		ZT	TZT	Zambezi	1998	2002	
Air Zimbabwe Rhodesia		RH			1978	1980	renamed/merged to Air Zimbabwe
Airlink Zimbabwe			FEM		2001	2003	
Avient Aviation		Z3	SMJ	AVAVIA	1993	2013	
Bumi Air					2012	2013	
Central African Airways		CE	CAA		1946	1967	
Expedition Airways		XO	XPD	Expedition	1997	1999	
First African Airways					2001	2006	
Fly Kumba			FKZ		2009	2011	
FlyAfrica.com		Z7	FZW	Fly Africa	2013	2018	
Flywell Airlines			FEM		1995	2001	renamed/merged to Airlink Zimbabwe
Fresh Air		Z7	FZW		2012	2013	
Global Africa Aviation		Z5	GAA	GLOBAL AFRICA	2014	2019	
Hunting-Clan Air Transport		HC			1956	1959	
Musee Air Svc					1994	1995	
Rainbow Airlines		RAT			2013	2017	
Rhodesian Air Services		RF			1960	1965	
Solenta Aviation Zimbabwe					2009	2012	
Wenela Rhodesia					1960	1968	
Zimbabwe Airlink		YZ	FEM		1995	2003	
Zimbabwe Airways		UM	AZW		2017	2017	
Zimbabwe Express Airlines		Z7			1994	1999	

== See also ==
- List of airlines of Zimbabwe
- List of airports in Zimbabwe
