= List of McDonnell Douglas MD-11 operators =

This list of McDonnell Douglas MD-11 operators lists current and former operators, in transport of cargo and passengers. (Note: This list is missing the UPS fleet of approximately 35 aircraft. World Airways also operated 8 MD-11s: 3 PAX, 1 F, 2 CF, and 2 PAX ERs.)

== Current ==
Airline	Country	Photos	MD-11	MD-11C	MD-11CF	MD-11ER	MD-11F^{a}	In service	Notes
FedEx Express	(United States)						74	28	Most aircraft were acquired from American, China Airlines, Delta, and Swiss. Mix of GE and PW engines. World's largest MD-11 operator. To be retired in 2032.
Western Global Airlines	(United States)						17	3	GE engines only.

== Former ==
Airline	Country	Photos	MD-11	MD-11C	MD-11CF	MD-11ER	MD-11F^{a}	Notes
Aer Lingus	(Republic of Ireland)		1					Leased from World Airways.
Aeroflot-Cargo	(Russia)						3	Merged back into Aeroflot in 2010.
Air Canada	(Canada)						1	Operated by World Airways.
Air Namibia	(Namibia)		2					
AirAsia	(Malaysia)					1		Leased from World Airways.
Alitalia	(Italy)		3	5				MD-11Cs were later converted to freighters.
American Airlines	(United States)		19					Replaced with the Boeing 777.
AV Cargo Airlines	(Zimbabwe)						3	Successor to Avient Aviation.
Avianca	(Colombia)					1		Leased from World Airways.
Avient Aviation	(Zimbabwe)						2	One written off as Flight 324. Ceased operations in 2013.
Cargoitalia	(Italy)						3	Ceased operations in 2011.
Centurion Air Cargo	(United States)						5	Ceased operations in 2018.
China Airlines	(Taiwan)		5					
China Cargo Airlines	(China)						9	
China Eastern Airlines	(China)		6					All were later converted to freighters.
Cielos Airlines	(Peru)						1	Leased from Gemini Air Cargo.
CityBird	(Belgium)		6					Ceased operations in 2001.
Delta Air Lines	(United States)		17					Replaced with the Boeing 777.
El Al	(Israel)					2		Leased from World Airways.
Ethiopian Airlines	(Ethiopia)		1				2	Passenger variant leased from World Airways.
Etihad Airways	(United Arab Emirates)						2	Operated by World Airways.
EVA Air	(Taiwan)		3				9	All later converted to freighters.
Finnair	(Finland)		5				2	Launch customer. Freighters converted from their own MD-11s.
Garuda Indonesia	(Indonesia)		11		2	5		Several leased from World Airways.
Gemini Air Cargo	(United States)						4	Ceased operations in 2008.
Ghana Airways	(Ghana)		1					Leased from World Airways.
Global Africa Aviation	(Zimbabwe)						3	Ceased operations in 2019.
Japan Airlines	(Japan)		10					All sold to UPS Airlines.
KLM	(Netherlands)		10					Last scheduled MD-11 passenger operation carried out on October 25, 2014.
Korean Air	(South Korea)		5					All later converted to freighter. One later crashed as Flight 6316.
LTU International	(Germany)		4					All sold to Swissair.
Lufthansa Cargo	(Germany)						17	Last major airline to order MD-11s. Received the very last MD-11 produced.
Malaysia Airlines	(Malaysia)		3					Leased from World Airways.
Mandarin Airlines	(Taiwan)		5					
Martinair	(Netherlands)				4		2	
MASkargo	(Malaysia)				2		1	Leased from World Airways.
Monarch Airlines	(United Kingdom)		1			1		Leased from World Airways.
Nordic Global Airlines	(Finland)						4	Ceased operations in 2015.
Philippine Airlines	(Philippines)				2	2		Leased from World Airways.
Sabena	(Belgium)		2					Leased from CityBird.
Saudia	(Saudi Arabia)		2				4	Two MD-11s were in VIP configuration.
Shanghai Airlines Cargo	(China)						4	Integrated into China Cargo Airlines in 2011.
SkyLease Cargo	(United States)				2		7	
SonAir	(Angola)					1		Leased from World Airways.
STAF	(Argentina)						1	Leased from World Airways.
Star Europe	(France)		1					Operated by CityBird.
Swiss International Air Lines	(Switzerland)		16					
Swissair	(Switzerland)		22					One written off as Swissair Flight 111. Ceased operation in 2002; Transferred to Swiss International Air Lines.
Swissair Asia	(Taiwan)		2					Ceased operations in 2001 all aircraft transferred back to Swissair.
TAM Linhas Aéreas	(Brazil)		2			1		
Thai Airways International	(Thailand)		4					All sold to UPS Airlines.
Transmile Air Services	(Malaysia)						4	All sold to FedEx Express.
UPS Airlines	(United States)						43	All were acquired from Varig, VASP, JAL, Thai, Swissair, Delta, and Lufthansa Cargo. Mix of GE and PW engines. Retired after UPS Airlines Flight 2976. Aircraft are scattered about North America, with aircraft being "Abandoned" by crews where they were after UPS grounded all MD-11s.
USAfrica Airways	(United States)		2					Leased from American Airlines.
Varig	(Brazil)		23			3		Largest MD-11 passenger operator.
Varig Logística	(Brazil)						2	
VASP	(Brazil)		9			1		
World Airways	(United States)		9			2	9	Ceased operations in 2014.

a.Includes the converted MD-11BCF variants.

== Orders and deliveries ==
Orders and deliveries sortable, presorted by customer
Customer	Orders							
Customer	MD-11	MD-11C	MD-11CF	MD-11ER	MD-11F	Total	GE	PW
Alitalia	3	5				8	8	
American Airlines	19					19	19	
China Airlines	4					4		4
China Eastern Airlines	5				1	6		6
City Bird	2			1		3	2	1
Delta Air Lines	15					15		15
EVA Air	3				8	11	11	
FedEx Express					22	22	19	3
Finnair	4					4	4	
Garuda Indonesia	6			3		9	9	
GATX	1					1		1
Guinness Peat Aviation	1				1	2	2	
ILFC	4		1		1	6		6
Japan Airlines	10					10		10
Kingdom of Saudi Arabia	2					2		2
KLM	10					10	10	
Korean Air	5					5		5
LTU International	4					4		4
Lufthansa Cargo					14	14	14	
Martinair			4		2	6		6
Mitsui & Co.	5					5	5	
Saudia					4	4	4	
Swissair	16					16		16
Thai Airways International	4					4	4	
Varig	4					4	4	
VASP	4					4	4	
World Airways				2		2		2
Total	131	5	5	6	53	200	119	81
