= Kitty Hawk =

Kitty Hawk or Kittyhawk may refer to:

== Places ==
- Kitty Hawk, North Carolina, where the Wright Brothers flew their first controlled flight in 1903
- Kitty Hawk, an area of Wright-Patterson Air Force Base in Ohio, US

== Airplane and air transport ==
- Curtiss Kittyhawk, the name used in Commonwealth air forces for the Curtiss Hawk Model 87, known in the US as the Curtiss P-40 Warhawk, variants D through N
- Kitty Hawk (airplane), commonly known as the Wright Flyer
- Kitty Hawk Aircargo, an American cargo airline
- Kitty Hawk Airways, an American airline
- Kitty Hawk Corporation, a Silicon Valley "flying car" start-up
- "Kittyhawk" one of the call signs used by flights carrying members of the royal family and UK Government ministers

== Military ==
- USS Kitty Hawk, a ship of the United States Navy
- KITTYHAWK, the airline code for military United Kingdom Royal VIP Flights
- Kitty Hawk Air Society, an Honor Society for the Air Force Junior Reserve Officers' Training Corps program
- Camp Kitty Hawk (renamed Camp Bonifas), a United Nations military post south of the Korean Demilitarized Zone

== Computers ==
- IBM Kittyhawk, a 2008 supercomputer designed by IBM to run the entire Internet
- HP Kittyhawk microdrive, a hard disk drive made by Hewlett Packard

== Other ==
- Kittyhawk (band), an emo band from Chicago, Illinois
- Kitty Hawk Middle School, in the Judson Independent School District, Universal City, Texas
- Kittyhawk, the call sign of the command module of the Apollo 14 spacecraft
- Kitty Hawks, American interior designer
