= TZT =

TZT or tzt can refer to:

- Air Zambezi, a former airline based in Zimbabwe (ICAO code: TZT)
- Tzʼutujil language, a Mayan language spoken by the Tzʼutujil people in Guatemala (ISO 639 code: tzt)
