= FZW =

FZW may refer to:

- FZW, station code for Fitzwilliam railway station, England
- FZW, ICAO airline code for Zimbabwe flyafrica.com
- FZW, ICAO airline code for Fresh Air, a defunct airline in Zimbabwe
- FZW, Specific Area Message Encoding code for Freeze Warning or Frost Warning
- Final Zodiac Warrior, fictional action show depicted in comedy web series Chop Socky Boom
