= Jack Malloch =

South African-born Rhodesian pilot, sanctions-buster and entrepreneur

John "Jack" McIvor Malloch
- Born: 8 October 1920; Durban, Natal, Union of South Africa
- Died: 26 March 1982 (aged 61); Salisbury, Zimbabwe
- Cause of death: Air accident
- Known for: Sanctions busting after UDI in Rhodesia; renovated and flew Mk 22 Spitfire until fatal crash
- Spouse: Zoe (née Coventry)
- Awards: Independence Commemorative Decoration (civil award)
- Aviation career
- Air force: Royal Air Force; Rhodesian Air Force
- Website: www.jackmalloch.com

John McVicar Malloch ICD, was a South African-born Rhodesian bush pilot, gun-runner and sanctions-buster who flew in World War II and in various legal and illegal roles around Africa and the Middle East until the early 1980s. In 1978, he was the final recipient of the Rhodesian civil Independence Commemorative Decoration for services rendered to the country.

== Early life ==
Jack Malloch was born in Durban, Natal, South Africa on 8 October 1920. In 1925, his family moved to Umtali (now Mutare) in the eastern highlands of Southern Rhodesia. He was sent back to South Africa in 1933 to attend a boarding school in Somerset West in the Cape Province, but was withdrawn from the school in 1935 to begin working as a garage mechanic. In 1936 he earned a driver's licence and began driving for the railways.

== World War II ==
In 1943 Malloch was accepted into the Royal Air Force; in December 1943 he received his pilot's wings and was sent to an operational squadron where he saw service as a fighter pilot. In February 1945 he was shot down behind enemy lines and wounded. He was kept safe from German capture by local partisans, who found a hiding place for him in the mountains. In April 1945, he was flown out and was able to rejoin his squadron.

== Post-War career ==
After the War, Malloch returned to Southern Rhodesia. He married his wife Zoe (née Coventry) in Salisbury (now Harare) in January 1948. He kept flying, and in March 1951 was one of the pilots who participated in the first Spitfire ferry of the new aircraft from the UK out to Southern Rhodesia for use in the Rhodesian Air Force. A year later, in March 1952, he formed Fish Air with Jamie Marshall. Later, in October 1955, they sold the company to Hunting Clan; Malloch was retained as a pilot.

== The 1960s ==
In 1960, Malloch formed a new company named Rhodesian Air Services (RAS), an airline head-quartered in Salisbury; from 1963 to 1964, the RAS was involved in gun-running in the Yemen. The following year, in January 1965, Malloch formed a new company called Air Trans Africa (ATA). In November 1965, Southern Rhodesia declared UDI from the British Commonwealth and became Rhodesia. In response, the United Kingdom applied strict sanctions, and ATA became involved in various sanctions-busting operations from 1966 to 1967.

=== The Congo ===
In 1960 the Republic of Congo (later Democratic Republic of Congo) gained independence from Belgium; the UHMK, with Belgian support, wanted to secede Katanga province from the rest of the country. Malloch began working for one of the secessionist leaders, Moise Tshombe, as a pilot. In July 1963, one of the Rhodesian Air Services Douglas DC-3s was shot down over Katanga by UN forces. By January 1963, the effort to secede Katanga had been defeated by UN forces, and their surrender led to the inclusion of the province in the Congo. Moise Tshombe returned from exile in June 1964 and was invited to become Prime Minister of the Congo. Malloch started working for Tshombe again, and between August and November 1964, he flew in support of the mercenary Mike Hoare against the Congolese rebels. Later, in 1967, the Mercenaries Revolt in the Congo was launched with the news that Tshombe had been kidnapped. Malloch flew re-supply missions for Jean "Black Jack" Schramme and his mercenaries from July–November 1967.

=== Biafra ===
In May 1967, Biafra declared independence from Nigeria, which sparked the Nigerian Civil War. Malloch made his first gun-running flight into Biafra to supply the rebels in July 1967; between 1967 and January 1970, he and his company ATA were making nightly weapons flights into Biafra. In 1968, he and the crew of his DC-7 were jailed on landing in Togo with a cargo of 9 tons of Nigerian banknotes. By January 1970, the Biafran rebellion had been defeated and the civil war thus came to an end.

== The 1970s & 1980s ==
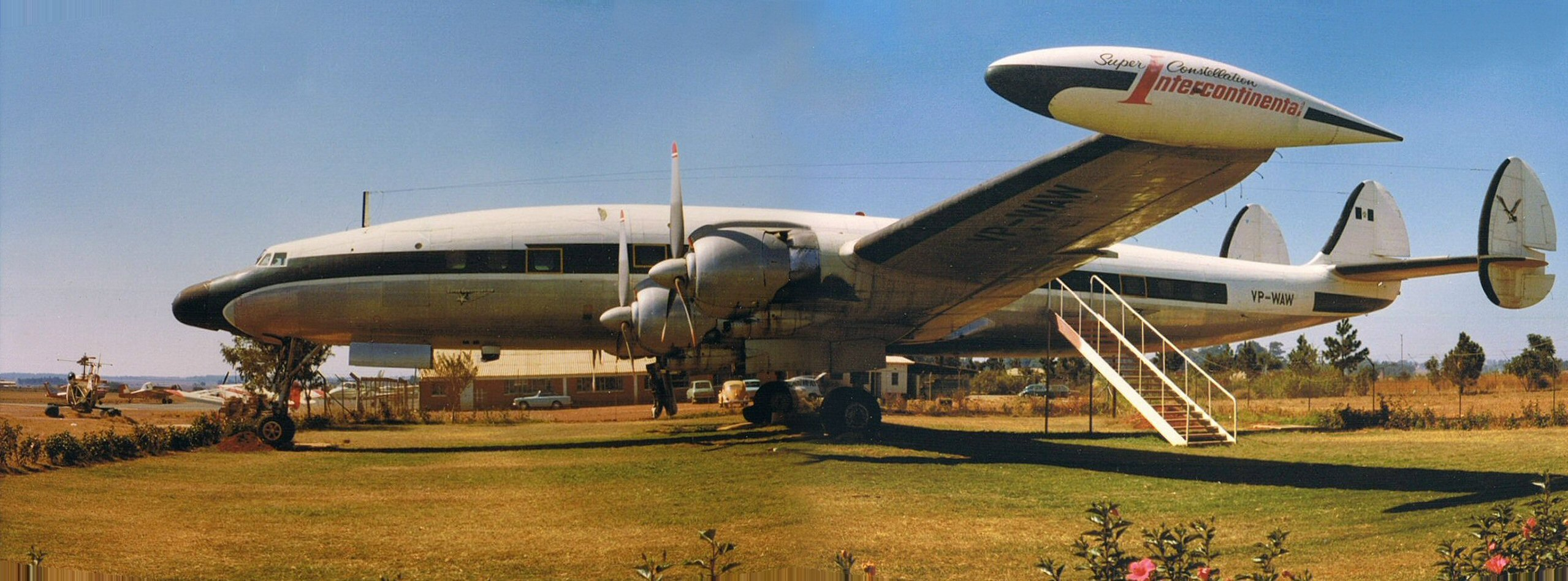
Former Afro-Continental Airways Lockheed L-1049 Super Constellation, Charles Prince Airport, Mount Hampden, 1975

In January 1970 Malloch formed a new company, this one named Afro-Continental Airways (ACA), as a subsidiary of Air Trans Africa. ACA operated an airline service between Salisbury, Rhodesia; Windhoek, South West Africa (now Namibia); and Blantyre, Malawi; flying a Lockheed L-1049G Super Constellation, registered as VP-WAW and formerly owned by Varig Brazilian Airlines. After only a few years the new airline ceased operations and the aircraft was permanently grounded, reportedly becoming a club-house at Charles Prince Airport, Mount Hampden, near Salisbury.

Between 1970 and 1980, Air Trans Africa, flying a fleet of Gabonese-registered aircraft, became heavily involved in Rhodesian sanctions-busting operations. In August 1973, the UK's Sunday Times newspaper ran an exposé of Malloch and his legal and illegal operations; this was the first public mention of his callsign "Tango Romeo", which was to become famous. Britain made their third complaint to the UN about Malloch and his sanctions-busting activities in May 1976. The following year, in January 1977, Malloch flew French mercenary Bob Denard and a team of mercenaries into Cotonou, Benin in a failed coup attempt.

In May 1978, Malloch's Canadair CL-44 was intercepted by two MiG 21s over Angola and was forced to escape through the mountains. In July of the same year, he flew a 30 kg coelacanth from the Comoro Islands back to Salisbury. His CL-44 was destroyed by fire at Salisbury airport in February 1982.

=== Rhodesian operations ===
Independence Commemorative Decoration ribbon bar

In January 1970 Malloch was called up as a reservist to the Rhodesian Air Force. He and his DC-7 aircraft become heavily involved in various Rhodesian military operations. He piloted the Rhodesians' largest SAS HALO paratroop drop over Mozambique in October 1977, and in November of the same year was involved with both the Rhodesian Army and the Rhodesian Air Force in Operation Dingo, a major raid conducted against the ZANLA-run refugee camp and, illegally, training center in Chimoio, Mozambique. In 1978, he was the final recipient of the Independence Commemorative Decoration for services rendered to Rhodesia. Malloch was heavily involved in the SAS operation in north-eastern Zambia to blow up a bridge, known as Operation Cheese, in September 1979.

=== Mark 22 Spitfire ===
In 1978, Malloch persuaded a Rhodesian Air Force base to part with the Mk 22 Spitfire which had been sitting on a plinth outside the air base for over 20 years. He began renovating it the same year, which process included having a five-bladed variable-pitch propeller custom-built by a German firm. In March 1980, he made the first flight in the newly renovated aircraft and it was featured at air shows in Zimbabwe at the time. Malloch was killed in his Mk 22 on the last day of filming the documentary Pursuit of a Dream on 26 March 1982 when he flew the aircraft into a thunderstorm.
