= UEU =

UEU can refer to

- Basque Summer University (Basque: Udako Euskal Unibertsitatea), a university headquartered in Eibar, Spain
- Esa Unggul University (Indonesian: Universitas Esa Unggul), a private university in Indonesia
- Unakkaga Ellam Unakkaga, a 1999 Tamil-language film
- United European Airlines (IATA code: UEU), a Romanian airline. See List of airline codes (U).
