= Global Africa Aviation =

Cargo airline based in Harare, Zimbabwe

IATA	ICAO	Call sign
Z5	GAA	GLOBAL AFRICA
- Founded: 2014
- Ceased operations: January 19, 2019
- Hubs: Robert Gabriel Mugabe International Airport
- Focus cities: Al Maktoum International Airport
- Fleet size: 3
- Headquarters: Harare, Zimbabwe
- Website: globalaa.net

Global Africa Aviation was a cargo airline based in Harare, Zimbabwe. It operated both scheduled and chartered cargo services using three MD-11 Freighters.

== History ==
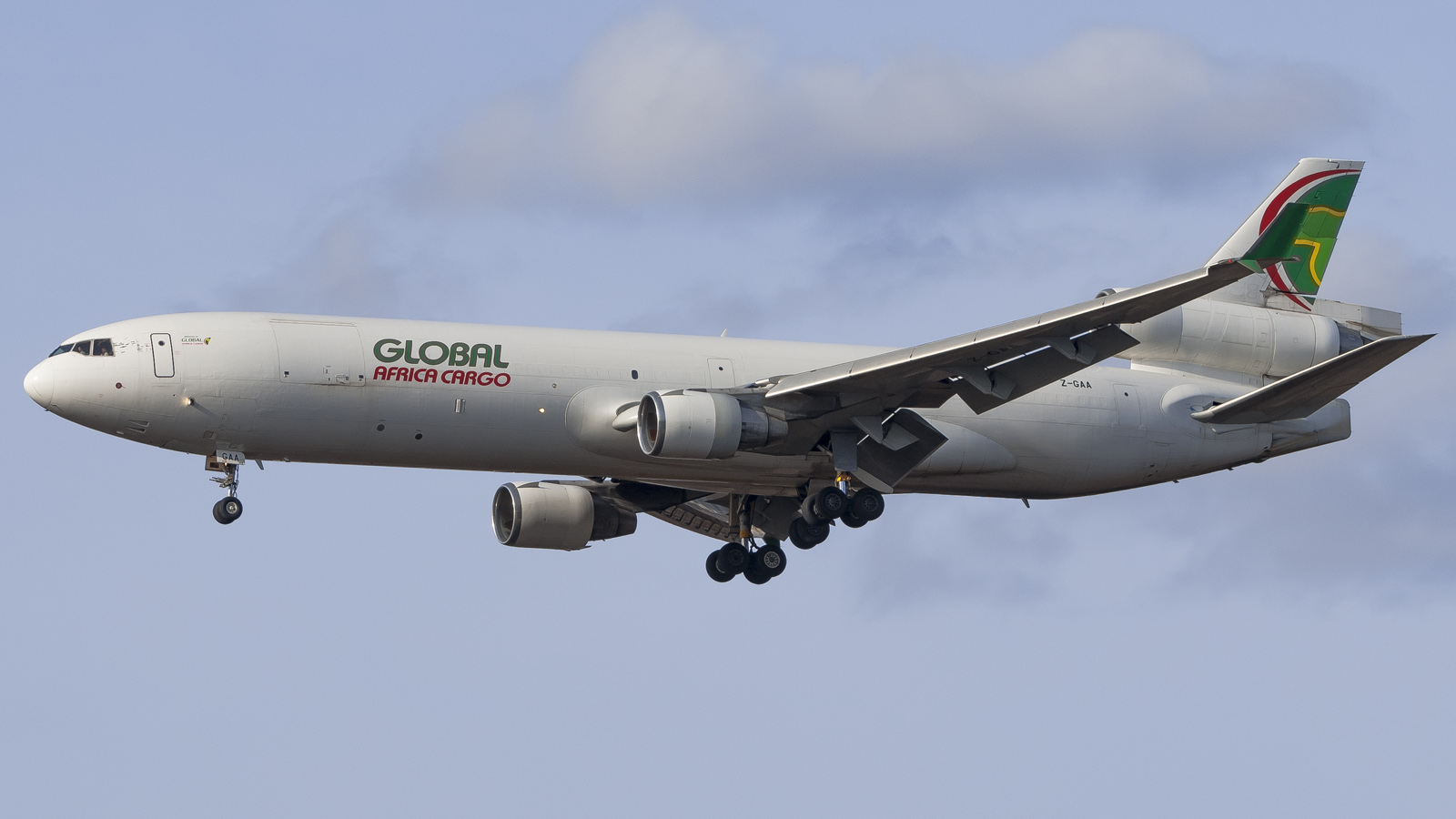
A Global Africa Aviation McDonnell Douglas MD-11F approaching at Vnukovo International Airport in 2017

The airline was founded in 2014 and was intended to be the successor to Avient Aviation. It originally launched feeder routes within Africa before expanding to cities in Europe. It ceased operations on January 19, 2019.

Global Africa Aviation was developing passenger operations at the time it folded in 2019. The airline had the capacity to offer charter passenger flights but also wanted to expand to scheduled passenger operations.

== Destinations ==
The charter destinations under Global Africa Cargo's demand contracts are detailed below:

Global Africa cargo destinations
Countries	Destinations	Airports
Zimbabwe	Harare	Robert Gabriel Mugabe International Airport (HUB)
South Africa	Johannesburg	O. R. Tambo International Airport
Kenya	Nairobi	Jomo Kenyatta International Airport
United Arab Emirates	Dubai	Al Maktoum International Airport
Belgium	Liege	Liege Airport
Czech Republic	Prague	Prague Airport
(North Vietnam) Vietnam	Hanoi	Noi Bai International Airport
Malaysia	Kuala Lumpur	Kuala Lumpur International Airport

== See also ==
- Avient Aviation
- List of defunct airlines of Zimbabwe
