= Afro-Continental Airways =

African airline

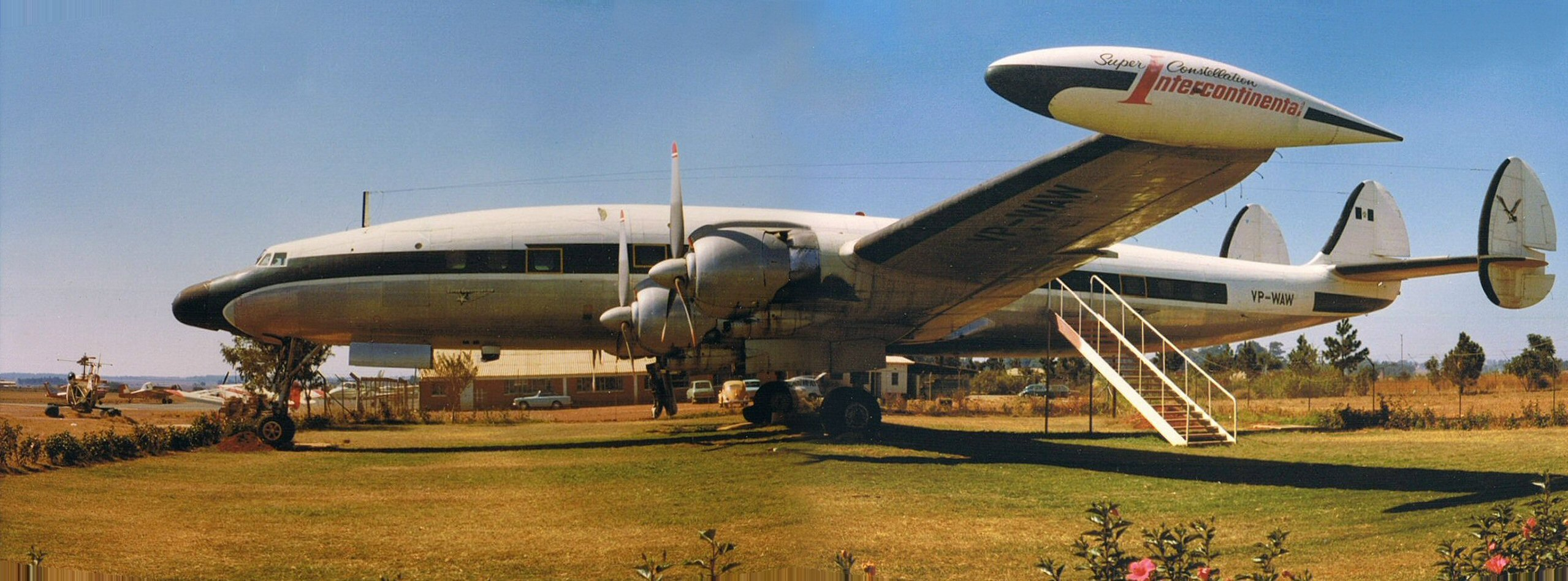
- The former Afro-Continental Airways Lockheed L-1049 Super Constellation, at Charles Prince Airport, 1975.
- Operating bases: Charles Prince Airport, Salisbury, Rhodesia
- Fleet size: 1

Afro-Continental Airways (ACA) was a subsidiary of Air Trans Africa, formed by Jack Malloch to operate a service between Salisbury, Rhodesia and Windhoek, South West Africa, and Malawi with a Lockheed L1049G Super Constellation (registration VP-WAW) acquired from Varig Brazilian Airlines.

After a relatively short time, operations ceased and the aircraft was grounded to become a club-house at Charles Prince Airport, Mount Hampden, near Salisbury, Rhodesia. The aircraft was reportedly broken up in the 1990s.
