= List of airlines of Zimbabwe =

This is a list of airlines currently operating in Zimbabwe.

Airline	IATA	ICAO	Callsign	Image	Commenced operations	Notes
Air Zimbabwe	UM	AZW	Air Zimbabwe		1961	
Central Air Transport Services (CATS)	ZO				2008	Air charter company
DHL Aviation (Zimbabwe)						Cargo carrier
Executive Air		AXE			1972	Air charter company
Fastjet Zimbabwe	FN	FJW	ZIMBIRD		2015	

== See also ==
- List of defunct airlines of Zimbabwe
- List of airports in Zimbabwe
