= Air Trans Africa =

African charter airline

IATA	ICAO	Call sign
AG	N/A	Transaf
- Founded: 1964
- Hubs: None
- Focus cities: Salisbury; Libreville
- Fleet size: 5
- Destinations: Domestic, Africa, Europe
- Headquarters: Salisbury, Rhodesia
- Key people: Jack Malloch
- Website: None

Air Trans Africa was formed by Jack Malloch in 1964 after his first company, Rhodesian Air Services failed in 1962. It operated a Super Constellation, a Douglas C-54 and a DH114 Heron aircraft. The airline's financial crises were compounded when the government of Southern Rhodesia, under Ian Smith, unilaterally declared independence on November 11, 1965.

== Operations ==
It was a charter airline flying cargo and/or passengers to many different destinations throughout Europe and Africa. The company carried mercenaries to the Congo in 1964 to help the government of Moise Tshombe quell the insurgency of a group of Congolese rebels called the Simba and acted as a charter carrier to the Biafran Civil War in Nigeria. During the civil war the C-54 was impounded and the crew imprisoned for a time in 1967.

== Fleet ==
The airline operated a Lockheed Super Constellation (VP-WAW) under the name of Afro Continental Airways after UDI for a weekly service from Salisbury to Windhoek and obtained a fleet of Douglas DC-7C and DC-7CF aircraft (with the assistance of the Rhodesian Government) which were registered in Gabon, when the airline became a major part of the Rhodesian sanctions-busting operations. They flew beef to Gabon, from where it was flown out by aircraft of its associate company Affretair. Essential materials for the Rhodesian security forces were brought into the country on the return flights. Affretair migrated to Zimbabwe after independence, when it replaced Air Trans Africa.

== Aircraft ==
Pre-UDI

- Douglas DC-4/C-54: VP-YTY
- C-47: VP-YTT
- de Havilland Heron: VP-WAM

Post UDI

- Lockheed 1049G Super Constellation: VP-WAW (transferred to Afro-Continental Airways)-this aircraft became a clubhouse at Charles Prince Airport (formerly Mount Hamden) when it was withdrawn from use. Believed to have been broken up in the 1990s.
- Douglas DC-7C (registered in Gabon): TR-LOK
- Douglas DC-7C/F (registered in Gabon): TR-LNY, TR-LNZ, TR-LOJ, TR-LPQ
- CL -44 swing tail turbo prop 4 engines

call sign was PG

Non IATA

Web page: www.jackmalloch.com

CL44: TR-LVO

DC-8-55F: TR-LVK and TR-LQR (later to be changed to PAA40 under CargOman, another company of Affretair's)
