= List of airline codes (U) =

This is a list of all airline codes. The table lists the IATA airline designators, the ICAO airline designators and the airline call signs (telephony designator). Historical assignments are also included for completeness.

== Codes ==
Airline codes
IATA	ICAO	Airline	Call sign	Country	Comments
	UEU	United European Airlines	UNITED EUROPEAN	Romania	2014
	UCG	Uniworld Air Cargo	UNIWORLD	Panama	2014
	CUH	Urumqi Airlines	LOULAN	China	2014
	DOD	USAF Air Mobility Operations Control Center		United States	
	DOI	U.S. Department of the Interior	INTERIOR	United States	Office of Aircraft Services
	CNV	U.S. Navy Reserve Logistic Air Forces	CONVOY	United States	U.S. Navy Reserve Logistic Air Forces, New Orleans, LA, USA
	EXM	United Kingdom Civil Aviation Authority	EXAM	United Kingdom	CAA Flight Examiners
	GIH	Union des Transports Africains de Guinee	TRANSPORT AFRICAIN	Guinea	
	GKA	US Army Parachute Team	GOLDEN KNIGHTS	United States	
	GWY	USA3000 Airlines	GETAWAY	United States	was U5
B7	UIA	UNI Air	GLORY	Taiwan	
	UAB	United Arabian Airlines	UNITED ARABIAN	Sudan	
UA	UAL	United Airlines	UNITED	United States	
4H	UBD	United Airways	UNITED BANGLADESH	Bangladesh	
	UAC	United Air Charters	UNITAIR	Zimbabwe	
	UCS	United Carriers Systems	UNITED CARRIERS	United States	
	UEA	United Eagle Airlines	UNITED EAGLE	China	
	UFS	United Feeder Service	FEEDER EXPRESS	United States	formerly part of United Express
	CFU	United Kingdom Civil Aviation Authority	MINAIR	United Kingdom	Civil Aviation Authority Flying Unit
	KRF	United Kingdom Royal VIP Flights	KITTYHAWK	United Kingdom	In Military Aircraft
	KRH	United Kingdom Royal VIP Flight	SPARROWHAWK	United Kingdom	In Civil Chartered Aircraft
	SDS	United Kingdom Civil Aviation Authority	STANDARDS	United Kingdom	Training Standards
	TQF	United Kingdom Royal VIP Flights	RAINBOW	United Kingdom	Helicopter Flights
	CGX	United States Coast Guard Auxiliary	COASTGUARD AUXAIR	United States	
	AGR	United States Department Of Agriculture	AGRICULTURE	United States	
	UAD	University Air Squadron		United Kingdom	MOD Boscombe Down
	UAJ	University Air Squadron		United Kingdom	Glasgow
	UAA	University Air Squadron		United Kingdom	Leuchars
	UAS	University Air Squadron		United Kingdom	RAF Cranwell
	HBU	Universal Avia	KHARKIV UNIVERSAL	Ukraine	
	HLE	UK HEMS	HELIMED	United Kingdom	
U7	JUS	USA Jet Airlines	JET USA	United States	
	LEA	Unijet	LEADAIR	France	
	MSH	US Marshals Service	MARSHALAIR	United States	US Department of Justice
	NDU	University of North Dakota	SIOUX	United States	
	PNA	Universal Airlines	PACIFIC NORTHERN	United States	
		Upali Air	UPALI	Sri Lanka	defunct
	RAU	Uganda Royal Airways	UGANDA ROYAL	Uganda	
	SAU	United Aviation Services	UNISERVE	Spain	
U6	SVR	Ural Airlines	SVERDLOVSK AIR	Russia	
	TRB	Ukraine Transavia	KIROVTRANS	Ukraine	
	UAF	United Arab Emirates Air Force	UNIFORCE	United Arab Emirates	
	UAI	Union Africaine des Transports	UNAIR	Ivory Coast	
	UCC	Uganda Air Cargo	UGANDA CARGO	Uganda	
	UCH	US Airports Air Charter	US CHARTER	United States	
	UCO	Ucoaviacion	UCOAVIACION	Spain	
	UES	Ues-Avia Aircompany	AVIASYSTEM	Ukraine	
QU	UGA	Uganda Airlines (1976–2001)	UGANDA	Uganda	Ceased operations 2001
UR	UGD	Uganda Airlines	CRESTED	Uganda	Started operations in 2019
	UGC	Urgemer Canarias	URGEMER	Spain	
	UHL	Ukrainian Helicopters	UKRAINE COPTERS	Ukraine	
	UHS	Ulyanovsk Higher Civil Aviation School	PILOT AIR	Russia	
	UJR	Universal Jet Rental de Mexico	UNIVERSAL JET	Mexico	
	UJT	Universal Jet Aviation	UNI-JET	United States	Cancelled 2014 - Renamed Journey Aviation with code JNY
	UKI	UK International Airlines	KHALIQ	United Kingdom	
	UKL	Ukraine Air Alliance	UKRAINE ALLIANCE	Ukraine	
UF	UKM	UM Airlines	UKRAINE MEDITERRANEE	Ukraine	Ukraine Mediterranean Airlines
	UKN	Ukraine Air Enterprise	ENTERPRISE UKRAINE	Ukraine	
	UKP	National Police Air Service	POLICE	United Kingdom	
6Z	UKS	Ukrainian Cargo Airways	CARGOTRANS	Ukraine	
	ULT	Ultrair	ULTRAIR	United States	
	ULH	Ultimate HELI	ULTIMATEHELI	South Africa	Ultimate HELI (Pty) Ltd
	ULR	Ultimate Air	VIPER	South Africa	Ultimate Airways (Pty) Ltd
OL	ULS	Ultra Air	AIR ULTRA	Colombia	
	UNC	Uni-Fly	UNICOPTER	Denmark	
	UNF	Union Flights	UNION FLIGHTS	United States	
	UNJ	Universal Jet	PROJET	Spain	
	UNS	Unsped Paket Servisi	UNSPED	Turkey	
	UNU	Unifly Servizi Aerei	UNIEURO	Italy	
	UPL	Ukrainian Pilot School	PILOT SCHOOL	Ukraine	
5X	UPS	United Parcel Service	UPS	United States	
	URV	Uraiavia	URAI	Russia	
US	AWE	US Airways	CACTUS	United States	defunct, merged with American Airlines in 2015
BS	UBG	US-Bangla Airlines	BANGLA STAR	Bangladesh	
	USF	USAfrica Airways	AFRICA EXPRESS	United States	
UH	USH	US Helicopter	US-HELI	United States	
	USJ	US Jet	USJET	United States	
	USX	US Express	AIR EXPRESS	United States	
QU	UTN	Skyline Express	Skyline Express Airline	Ukraine	
	TUM	UTAir	UTAIR-CARGO	Russian Federation	2014
UT	UTA	UTair Aviation	UTAIR	Russia	WAS P2 till 2006
	UTR	Utair South Africa	AIRUT	South Africa	
	UTS	Ukrainian State Air Traffic Service Enterprise	AIRRUH	Ukraine	
	UTU	Urartu-Air		Armenia	
	UVA	Universal Airways	UNIVERSAL	United States	
	UVG	Universal Airlines	GUYANA JET	Guyana	
	UVM	Uvavemex	UVAVEMEX	Mexico	
	AIO	United States Air Force	AIR CHIEF	United States	Chief of Staff
	UVN	United Aviation	UNITED AVIATION	Kuwait	
HY	UZB	Uzbekistan Airways	UZBEK	Uzbekistan	
PS	AUI	Ukraine International Airlines	UKRAINE INTERNATIONAL	Ukraine	
	WEC	Universal Airlines	AIRGO	United States	
US		Unavia Suisse		Switzerland	
	QID	USAF 100th Air Refueling Wing	QUID	United States	
	UIT	University of Tromsø School of Aviation	ARCTIC	Norway	
	UNO	United Nations	UNITED NATIONS	n/a	UNOxxx followed by P(peacekeeping), or H(Humanitarian)

== IATA Traffic Conference Areas ==
The International Air Transport Association (IATA) divides the world into three areas called the Traffic Conference Areas (TCAs) for air travel purposes. These areas are used to define geographical boundaries for fare construction and other industry-related practices:

- Traffic Conference Area 1 (TC1) – this area includes the Americas, encompassing North America (the Caribbean, Central America, and Northern America) and South America.
- Traffic Conference Area 2 (TC2) – this area includes the EMEA region, encompassing Europe, the Middle East, and Africa (North Africa and Sub-Saharan Africa).
- Traffic Conference Area 3 (TC3) – this area includes the Asia–Pacific region, encompassing the rest of Asia (Central Asia, East Asia, North Asia, South Asia, and Southeast Asia) and Oceania.

Essentially, TC1 covers the "New World", while TC2 and TC3 together cover the "Old World" (Africa-Eurasia) and the "Land Down Under".

== See also ==
- IATA airport code
- ICAO airport code
