= Avient Aviation Flight 324 =

2009 aviation accident in China

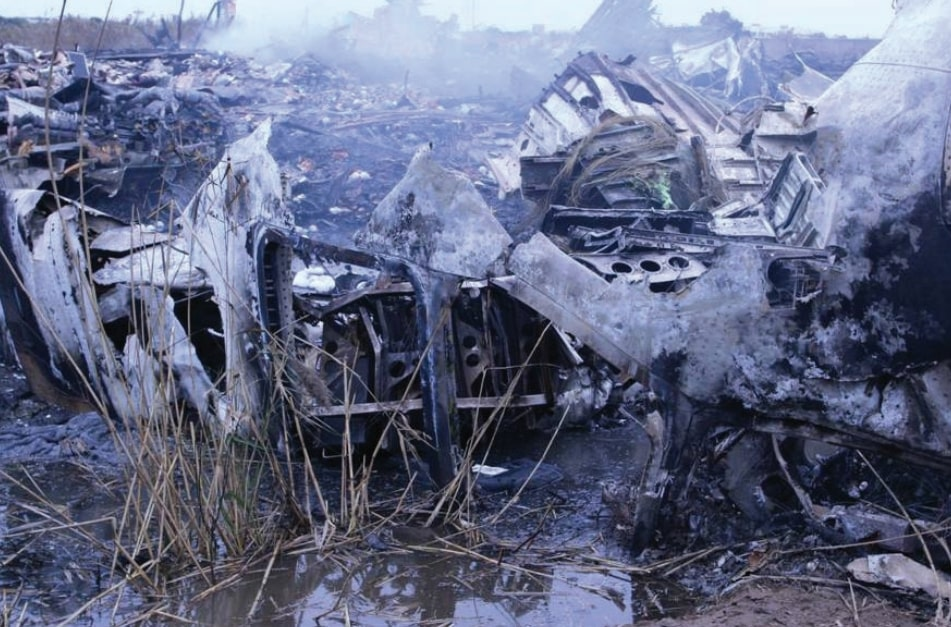
- Wreckage of the aircraft

Accident
- Date: 28 November 2009
- Summary: Runway excursion
- Site: Shanghai Pudong International Airport, Shanghai, China

Aircraft
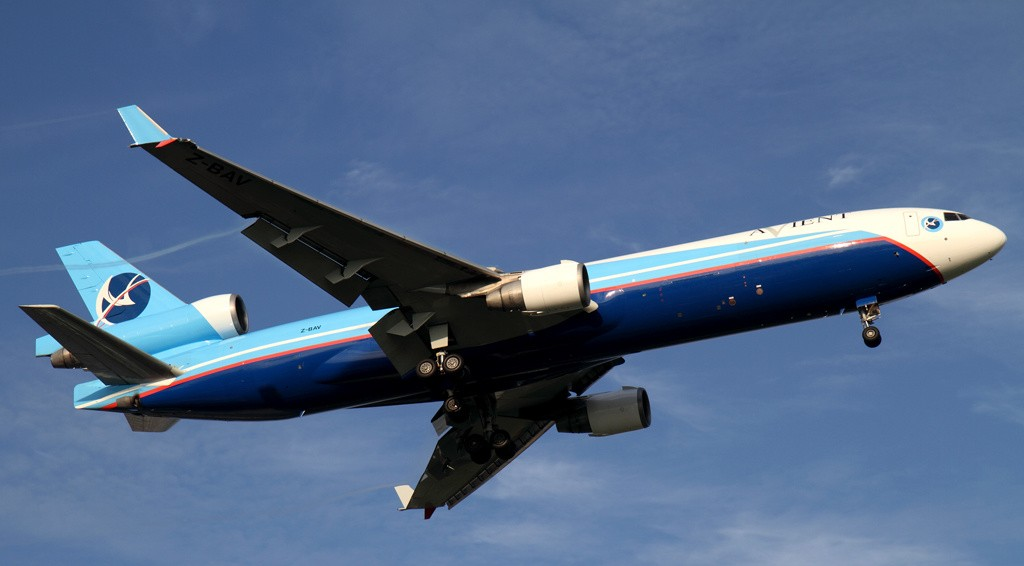
- Z-BAV, the aircraft involved, seen three days before the accident
- Aircraft type: McDonnell Douglas MD-11F
- Operator: Avient Aviation
- IATA flight No.: Z3324
- ICAO flight No.: SMJ324
- Call sign: AV AVIA 324
- Registration: Z-BAV
- Flight origin: Shanghai Pudong International Airport, Shanghai, China
- Destination: Manas International Airport, Bishkek, Kyrgyzstan
- Occupants: 7
- Passengers: 0
- Crew: 7
- Fatalities: 3
- Injuries: 4
- Survivors: 4

On 28 November 2009, at 08:12 (UTC+8), Avient Aviation Flight 324, a McDonnell Douglas MD-11F, registration Z-BAV (c/n 48408) operated by Avient Aviation departing Shanghai Pudong International Airport destined for Manas International Airport, near Bishkek, crashed during its takeoff roll with the loss of three lives.

== Aircraft ==
Avient Aviation took delivery of Z-BAV on 20 November 2009, eight days before the crash.

== Incident ==
As the aircraft rotated for departure, the tail struck the ground, and the aircraft then overshot the end of the runway, crashed and landed on top of a warehouse near the runway. The plane was written off.

Crew members were from the United States (4), Indonesia (1), Belgium (1) and Zimbabwe (1).

== Investigation ==
Official investigation reports have been difficult to acquire over the years; on 28 February 2020, an English translation of a "brief abstract" of a Chinese investigation became publicly available. According to this translated abstract, the thrust levers were never advanced to takeoff position, and the autothrust never transitioned to takeoff mode. The crew perceived through physical cues that thrust was abnormally low, but neither identified the problem nor took any corrective action. Simulations seemed to indicate that with timely corrective action, recovery and prevention of the accident was possible. Fatigue was suspected to be a contributing factor for all crew members, many suffering jetlag from lengthy travel and numerous time zone transitions to position themselves for the accident flight.
