= Nordic Global Airlines =

Finnish cargo airline (2011–2015)

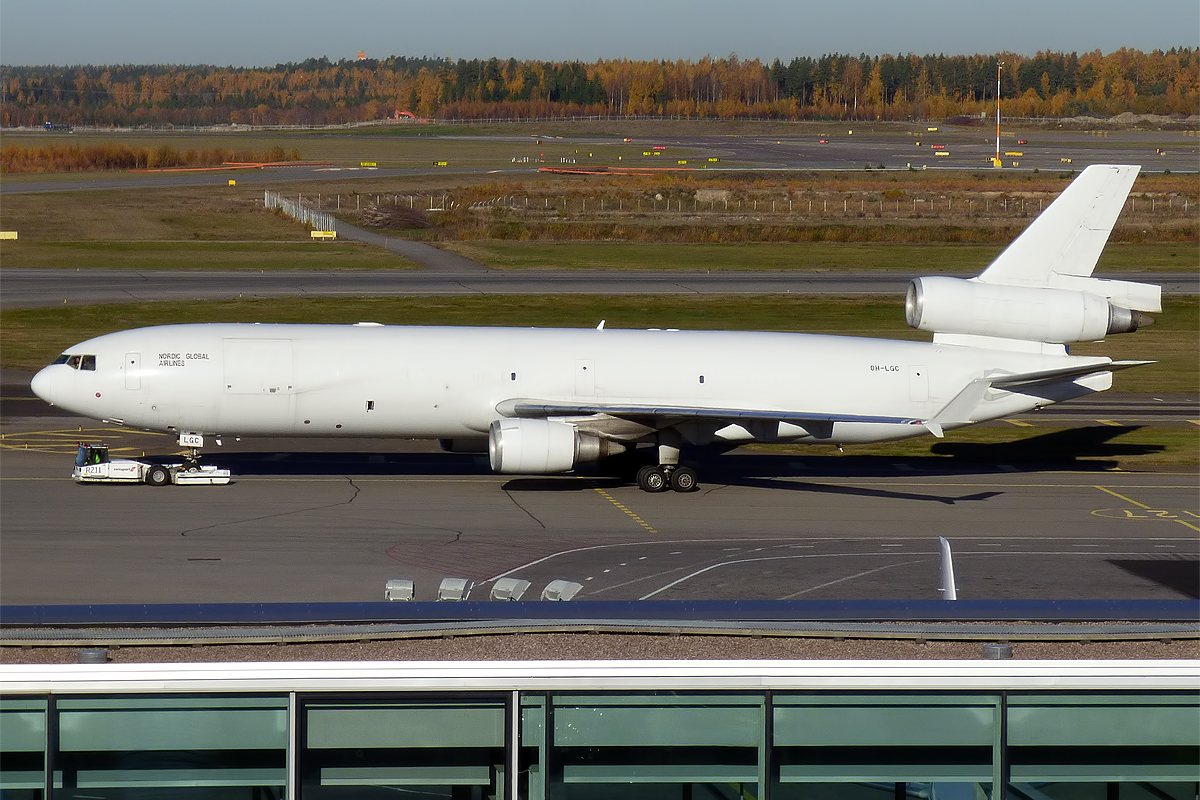
- McDonnell Douglas MD-11F
IATA	ICAO	Call sign
NJ	NGB	NORDIC GLOBAL
- Founded: 11 April 2011
- Ceased operations: 31 May 2015
- Hubs: Helsinki Airport; Liège Airport
- Fleet size: 2
- Destinations: 6 (scheduled)
- Headquarters: Vantaa, Finland
- Website: nordicglobalcargo.com

Nordic Global Airlines Oy was a Finnish cargo airline based at Helsinki Airport which existed in the years 2011–2015.

== History ==
Nordic Global Airlines was founded in April 2011 and commenced operations in the following month of August. It was owned by Finnair (40%), Daken Capital Partners (29%), Neff Capital Management (20%) and Ilmarinen Mutual Insurance Company (11%).

In May 2015, it was announced that the air carrier would cease operations by the end of May 2015 "due to economic considerations regarding the competitive market".

== Destinations ==
As of May 2015, Nordic Global Airlines provided scheduled freighter flights from Helsinki to Brussels, New York JFK, Hanoi and Hong Kong (via Novosibirsk) and also operated ACMI and charter services to several destinations throughout Europe and Africa, such as Frankfurt and Nairobi.

== Fleet ==
As of May 2015, the Nordic Global Airlines fleet consisted of the following cargo aircraft:

Nordic Global Airlines Fleet
Aircraft	In fleet	Orders	Notes
McDonnell Douglas MD-11F	2	—	
