= Zimbabwe Airways =

Zimbabwean airline

IATA	ICAO	Call sign
8Z	ZIB	ZIMAIRWAYS
- Founded: January 1, 2018
- Ceased operations: 2018
- Hubs: Robert Gabriel Mugabe International Airport
- Fleet size: 5
- Parent company: Zimbabwe Airways (Private) Limited
- Headquarters: Robert Gabriel Mugabe International Airport, Harare, Zimbabwe
- Website: www.flyzimbabweairways.com

Zimbabwe Airways (Private) Limited (operating as Zimbabwe Airways) (IATA: 8Z, ICAO: ZIB), was a government-owned airline in Zimbabwe.

In 2018, the government dropped the plan to launch this airline.

== Overview ==
The national carrier, Air Zimbabwe, applied to the State Procurement Board (SPB) in October 2016 for permission to acquire four Boeing 777-200ER aircraft formerly flown by Malaysia Airlines. Permission was duly granted in November of the same.

Negotiations were carried out in secret, so as not to jeopardize the sensitive deal. Eventually the State put together enough money to pay for two of the B777s and one Embraer E-Jet. However, by the time the planes arrived in the country, Air Zimbabwe had deteriorated to such an extent, that it could not present a "credible business plan to run the planes on a sustainable, profitable basis". The government registered Zimbabwe Airways, which developed a credible business plan. The government created "Zimbabwe Aviation Leasing Company", which owns the planes and leases them to Zimbabwe Airways. As of April 2018, Zimbabwe Airways is yet to receive an Air operator's certificate (AOC), from the Zimbabwe Civil Aviation Authority.

== Ownership and management ==
According to Patrick Chinamasa, the Zimbabwean Finance Minister, Zimbabwe Airlines is 100 percent owned by the government of Zimbabwe and was created to facilitate the national aviation industry and to relieve the cash-strapped and financially ailing national carrier, Air Zimbabwe, with over US$300 million in debts.

== Destinations ==
The destinations of the airline are being finalized, but are expected to include London, Johannesburg, Beijing and large metropolitan and tourist cities inside Zimbabwe.

== Fleet ==
As of April 2018, the Zimbabwe Airways fleet consisted of the following aircraft:

Zimbabwe Airways Fleet
Aircraft	In Fleet	Orders	Passengers				Notes
Aircraft	In Fleet	Orders	F	C	Y	Total	Notes
Boeing 777-200ER	1	1	16	58	227	301	stored
Embraer ERJ-145	—	3	—	12	64	76	
Total	1	4					

== See also ==
- Transportation in Zimbabwe
