= Affretair =

Airline of Zimbabwe (1965–2000)

IATA	ICAO	Call sign
AG; ZL	AFM	AFRO
- Founded: 1965
- Ceased operations: 2000
- Hubs: Harare International Airport
- Focus cities: Brussels Airport, Johannesburg International Airport, Lilongwe, Luanda, Lusaka
- Fleet size: 2
- Headquarters: Harare, Zimbabwe
- Key people: Jack Malloch
- Website: http://www.planet.nu/sunshinecity/affretair/

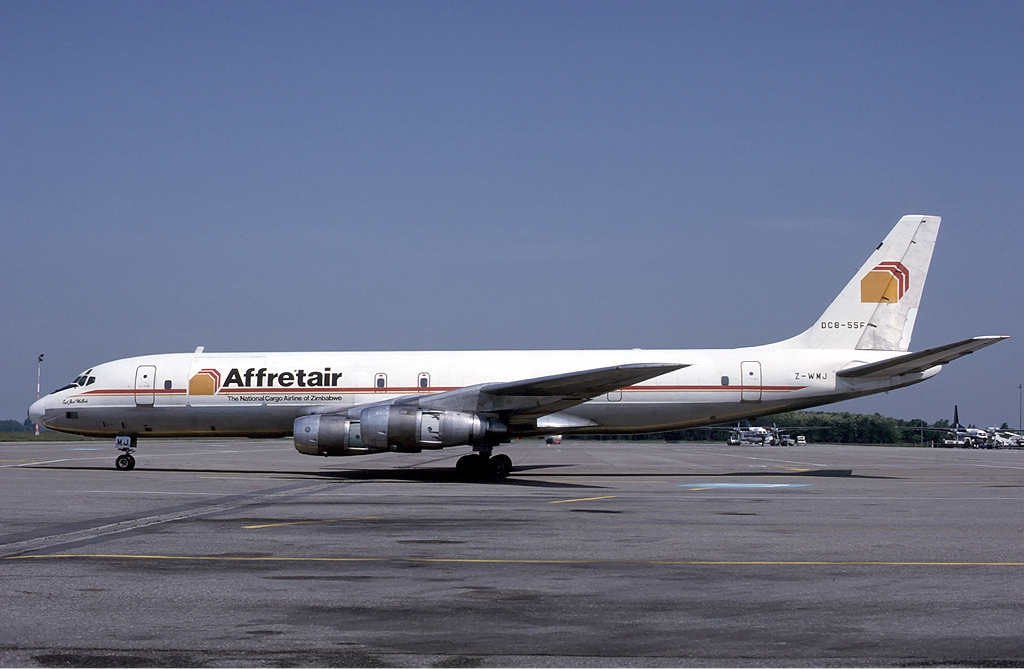
Affretair Douglas DC-8, Basle/Mulhouse, 1984

Affretair (National Cargo Airline of Zimbabwe) was a cargo airline based in Zimbabwe.

== History ==
Affretair was formed as a Gabon-based associate company of Air Trans Africa, when a Douglas DC-8 aircraft was acquired in the early 1970s for overseas freight operations. This was part of the Rhodesian "sanctions-busting" operations, where Rhodesian high-quality beef was flown by Douglas DC-7F to Gabon by Air Trans Africa, and then carried by Affretair to Europe.

In the 1980s Affretair operated two Douglas DC-8-50F aircraft on cargo flights to Europe and within Africa. It was taken over by Air Zimbabwe in 1983.

In August 1997 it was reported that Affretair's Douglas DC-8 had been grounded the previous month as it no longer met required international standards and would no longer be allowed to land at some airports in Europe. The Zimbabwean government stepped in to save Affretair from collapse by facilitating a multimillion-dollar deal with a British aviation company, Aviation Star, which leased a Boeing 707 to replace the no-longer compliant DC-8. By 1998 Affretair was (according to their website) flying a Douglas DC-8-73F into Europe using Brussels as a hub and a Boeing 727 freighter to Lusaka, Lilongwe, Johannesburg and Luanda.

Affretair was liquidated in 2000 under a $511 million debt that had grounded its only aircraft for close to two years. In October 2001 it was reported that Affretair, currently under liquidation, was selling its assets to raise money to offset its mounting $800 million debt owed to several creditors.

== Accidents and incidents ==
- On 29 June 1969, an Affretair Douglas C-54 Skymaster (registered TR-LNV) crashed shortly after take-off from an airstrip in Uli, Nigeria.
- On 28 February 1982, a parked Affretair Canadair CL-44 (registered TR-LVO) was destroyed in a fire at Harare International Airport.
- On 28 January 1996, an Affretair Douglas DC-8 (registered Z-WSB) was damaged beyond repair when it overran the runway upon landing at Harare Airport following a cargo flight from Johannesburg.
