= Uraiavia =

IATA	ICAO	Call sign
—	URV	URAI
- Founded: 1993
- Ceased operations: 2011
- Hubs: Tyumen
- Fleet size: 8
- Headquarters: Tyumen, Russia
- Key people: Volodymyr Skurikhin (Head)

UraiAvia (УРАЙАВИА) was an airline based in Tyumen, Russia which was founded in 1993. Its license has since been revoked.

== Incidents ==
On 10 August 1995, an Antonov 2R (registration RA-40371) was written off in Mezhdurechensk. There were no fatalities.

== Fleet ==
Uraiavia operated a fleet of 8 × Mi-8T.
