= USS Kitty Hawk =

Two ships of the United States Navy have been named USS Kitty Hawk (after Kitty Hawk, North Carolina):

- USS Kitty Hawk (AKV-1) was a cargo ship and aircraft transport that served during World War II
- USS Kitty Hawk (CV-63) is the lead ship of the Kitty Hawk-class aircraft carriers, and was in commission between 1961 and 2009

See also

- Kitty Hawk was the name of the Command Module on Apollo 14
