= Zimbabwe Airlink =

Zimbabwean airline

| IATA | ICAO | Call sign |
|---|---|---|
| YZ | FEM | — |
- Founded: 1995 (as Flywell Airlines); 2001 (as Zimbabwe Airlink)
- Ceased operations: 2003
- Parent company: Airlink

Zimbabwe Airlink was an airline based in Zimbabwe, operating in an alliance with South African Airways, South African Express and South African Airlink on flights between Zimbabwe and South Africa using a fleet of Embraer ERJ-135 regional jets.

== History ==
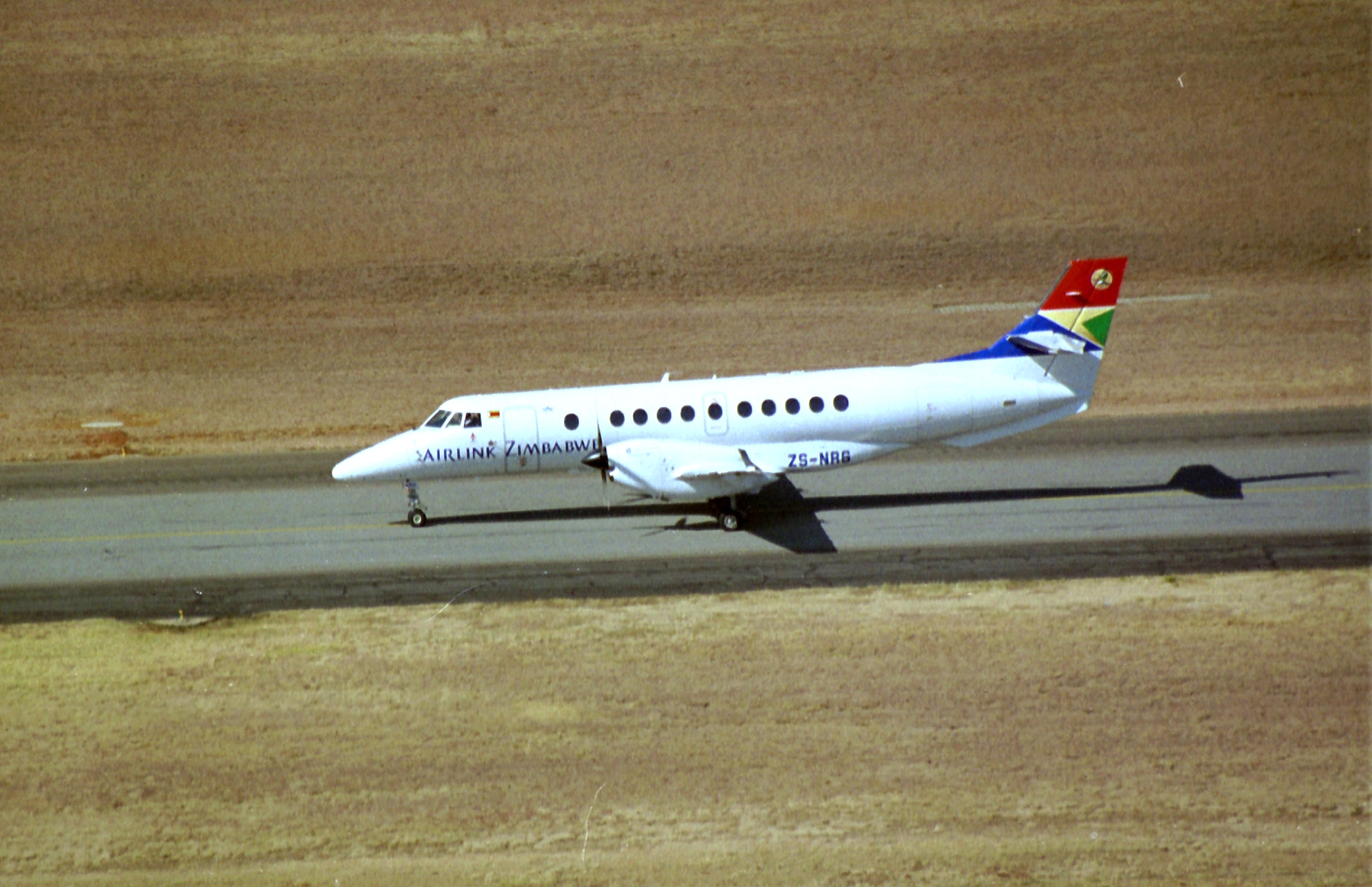
Jet of Airline Zimbabwe from 2003.

The airline was founded in 1995 as Flywell Airlines, and was rebranded on 21 November 2001 following South African Airlink buying a 49 percent stake. The Zimbabwe Airlink brand was discontinued by the end of 2003, and all flights were taken over by South African Airlink.
