= Zimbabwe Express Airlines =

Airline headquartered in Zimbabwe

IATA	ICAO	Call sign
Z7	EZX	Zimexpress
- Founded: 1994
- Ceased operations: 2003
- Hubs: Harare
- Fleet size: 4
- Destinations: Johannesburg, Bulawayo, Victoria Falls
- Headquarters: Harare, Zimbabwe
- Key people: Nokuthaba Sibanda in charge of Training Flight Attendants, Sinobuhle Ndlovu Ex Wife of Evans Ndebele who was in charge of Administrative Operations

Zimbabwe Express Airlines was an airline from Zimbabwe, that was operational between 1994 and 2004. It was publicly owned and was the second airline in Zimbabwe to break the monopoly of Air Zimbabwe.

== History ==
It was founded by Bulawayo businessman Evans Ndebele, originally launching operations as a domestic subsidiary of Air Zimbabwe with a BAe 146. The partnership with Air Zimbabwe ended in 1995 after a disagreement over the acquisition of aircraft. It continued as an independent entity, leasing a Hawker Siddeley HS748 and two Boeing 727-100 aircraft from South Africa. Later it operated a Boeing 727-200 and two Douglas DC-9-32.

== Services ==
Services included Harare to Bulawayo, Victoria Falls and Johannesburg with codeshare agreements to Kilimanjaro with Monarch Airlines and Cape Town with now defunct Sun Air South Africa. The airline eventually failed with financial problems, exacerbated by the collapse of its strategic partner Sun Air of South Africa.

== Fleet ==
The airline operated one British Aerospace 146, a Hawker Siddeley HS 748, two Boeing 727-100, a Boeing 727-200 and a McDonnell Douglas DC-9. One of the 727-100s in the fleet was the 15th ever built.
