= USAfrica Airways =

Airline of the United States

IATA	ICAO	Call sign
E8	USF	AFRICA EXPRESS
- Commenced operations: June 1994; 32 years ago
- Ceased operations: February 3, 1995; 31 years ago
- Fleet size: 2
- Destinations: South Africa
- Headquarters: Reston, Virginia
- Key people: Michael Meszaros - Exec VP Marketing (Founder); Arthur Lewis - Chairman (Founder); Greg Lewis - CEO; Edward Bolton - CEO

USAfrica Airways was a United States–based airline that operated flights between Washington Dulles International Airport (then called Dulles International Airport) and Johannesburg starting in June, 1994. Its headquarters was in Reston, Virginia, and it had an office in Washington, DC.

Flights refueled in the Cape Verde Islands. Later, once a week flights were added to Cape Town, which also refueled in the Cape Verde Islands.

The airline was the first U.S. airline flying only international routes since the U.S. airline industry was deregulated in 1978.

The airline operated flights from June 1994 to February 3, 1995.

== Fleet ==
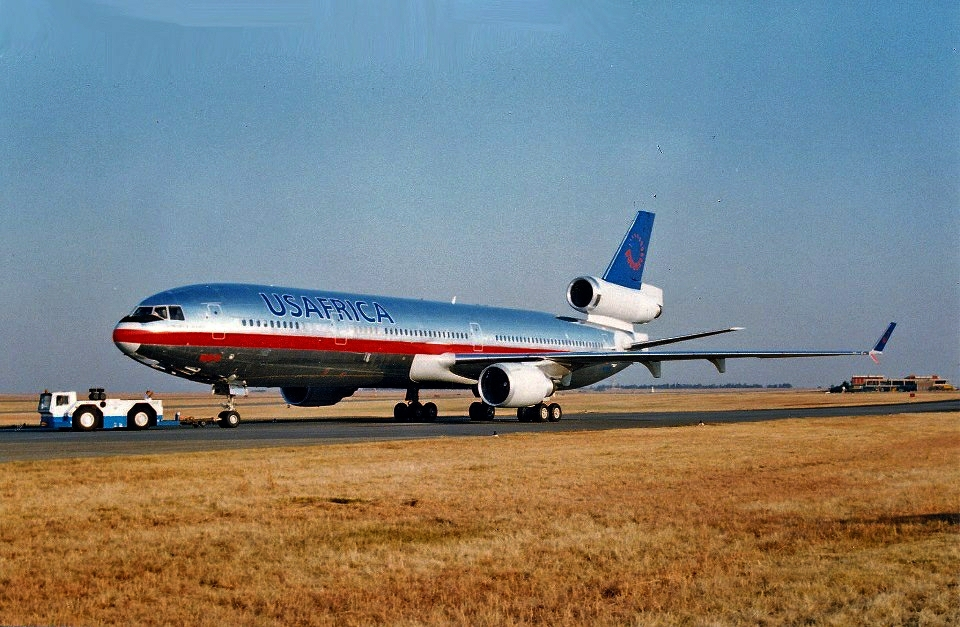
A USAfrica Airways McDonnell Douglas MD-11 (N1758B)

It leased two McDonnell Douglas MD-11 aircraft from American Airlines, registered as N1757A and N1758B.

== See also ==
- List of defunct airlines of the United States
