= Rhodesian Air Services =

Airline of Rhodesia (now Zimbabwe)

- The logo used by the Rhodesian Air Services on the tail fin of their aircraft.
IATA	ICAO	Call sign
RF	—	—
- Founded: 1960
- Ceased operations: 1965
- Operating bases: Salisbury Airport
- Headquarters: Salisbury, Southern Rhodesia

Rhodesian Air Services (RAS) was an airline from Southern Rhodesia (today's Zimbabwe, until 1963 part of the Federation of Rhodesia and Nyasaland) from 1960 to 1965. Formed by Jack Malloch and headquartered in Salisbury, it operated scheduled and chartered passenger flights on regional routes.

== Route network ==
In 1965, RAS offered scheduled flights to the following destinations in Southern Rhodesia:

- Bulawayo - Bulawayo Airport
- Chiredzi - Buffalo Range Airport
- Fort Victoria
- Salisbury - Salisbury Airport (base)
- Triangle

== Fleet ==
Upon closure, the Rhodesian Air Services fleet consisted of the following aircraft:

Rhodesian Air Services fleet
Aircraft	In fleet
de Havilland Dove	1
Douglas C-47 Skytrain	2
Douglas DC-4	1
Total	4

The livery consisted of a red tail with a stylized white 'R', a white semicircle on the trailing edge and a blue cheatline. A seahorse was painted on the nose.

== Accidents and incidents ==
- On 22 November 1961, a Rhodesian Air Services Douglas C-47 Skytrain (registered VP-YRX) crashed near Salisbury Airport, killing two of the three occupants that had intended to fly the aircraft to Livingstone. Shortly after take-off, an engine problem had been encountered, which the pilot had failed to address properly so that control was lost.
