= Air Zambezi =

Zimbabwean airline (1998–2002)

IATA	ICAO	Call sign
ZT	TZT	ZAMBEZI
- Founded: 1998
- Ceased operations: 2002
- Hubs: Harare
- Fleet size: 2
- Key people: Oliver Chidawu (CEO)

Air Zambezi was an airline based in Zimbabwe, which was active between 1998 and 2002. The airline's main base was in Harare and its CEO was Oliver Chidawu.

== Destinations ==
Historically, the Air Zambezi destinations included:

- Harare
- Hwange
- Kariba
- Victoria Falls

== Fleet ==
Historically, the Air Zambezi fleet included:

- 1 Cessna 208 Caravan
- 1 Let L-410 Turbolet
