= Charles Prince Airport =

Airport in Harare, Zimbabwe

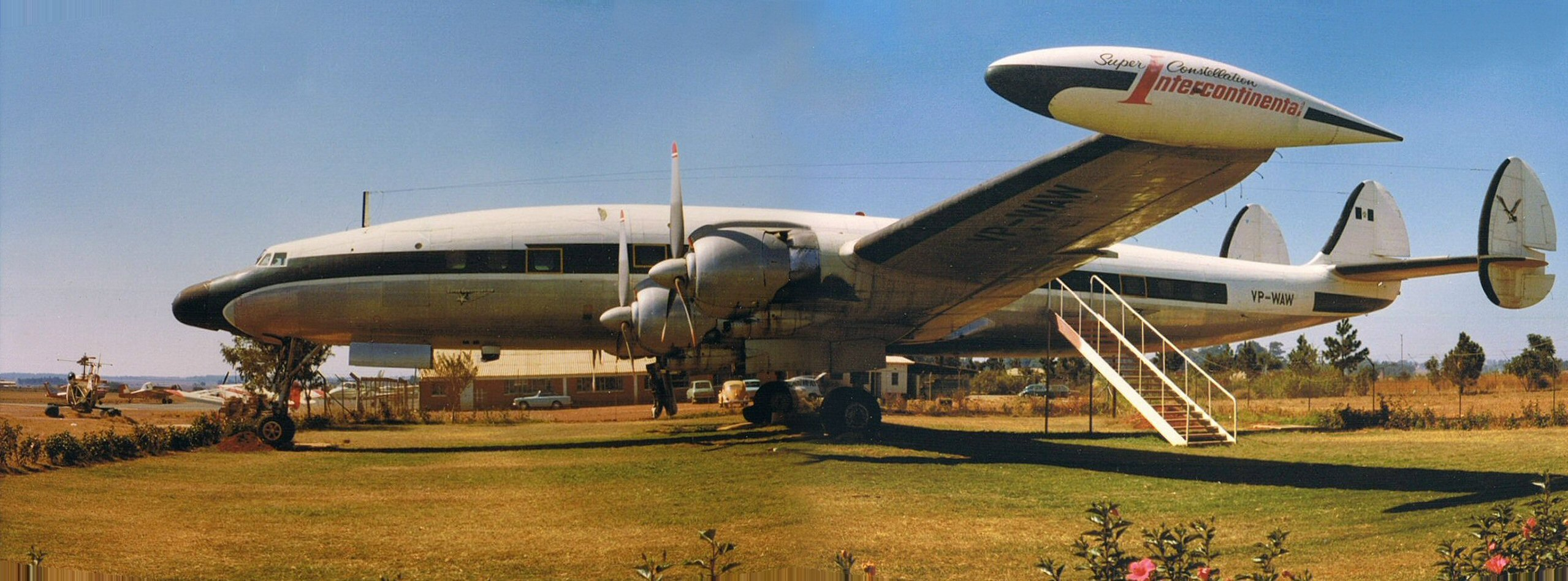
- Super Constellation parked at Charles Prince Airport in 1975 and used as a clubhouse.
- IATA: none; ICAO: FVCP

Summary
- Airport type: Public
- Owner: Airports Company of Zimbabwe (Pvt) Ltd.
- Operator: Airports Company of Zimbabwe (Pvt) Ltd.
- Serves: Harare
- Location: Mount Hampden
- Elevation AMSL: 4,845 ft (1,477 m)
- Coordinates: 17°45′05″S 30°55′30″E

Map
- Location of the airport in Zimbabwe

Runways
Direction	Length		Surface
Direction	m	ft	Surface
06/24	1,200	3,937	Asphalt
14/32	925	3,035	Asphalt
- Sources: GCM Google Maps

Charles Prince Airport (ICAO: FVCP), formerly named Mount Hampden and renamed after former airport manager Charles Prince (who was a Royal Air Force officer during World War II), is approximately 16 kilometres (9.9 mi) northwest of Harare, Zimbabwe. During World War II it served as a Rhodesian Air Training Group location, training pilots for the British Commonwealth Air Training Plan. In 1973 the airport was converted to civilian use.

== History ==
=== RAF Mount Hampden ===
In 1940 during World War II, the Empire Air Training Scheme was launched in Southern Rhodesia, establishing the need for a large number of training stations. As for most RAF stations, the planning for a station at Mount Hampden was done by Squadron Leader C. W. Glass, and the site selection was undertaken by Flight Lieutenant B. Roxburgh-Smith. The site was ideal as it had access by road and rail, had an ample supply of electricity, and was reasonably flat with adequate draining. However, as Mount Hampden was located more remotely than other stations located in Salisbury (Harare), Bulawayo and Gwelo (Gweru, special arrangements were made to obtain water from borehole)s. Afterwards, the water would be chlorinated and stored in large tanks, providing a safe supply of water. Three hangars were built, and construction of the hangars was undertaken by Wrightson & Co., Ltd.. While other stations undertook malaria surveys before occupation for suitability, Mount Hampden was surveyed after occupation.

On 1 April 1941, the No. 28 Elementary Flying Training School (EFTS) was established at RAF Mount Hampden. It was the last elementary flying school to open within the scheme. Cadets were commonly instructed on the de Havilland DH.82A Tiger Moth, North American T-6 Texan, and the Fairchild PT-26 from the airfield. The station was given the motto, Pana Maziñana ano Bururuka, which translated to Here Fledglings Take Wing. From March 1943, the No. 28 EFTS was assigned a relief landing ground at Oldbury and another at Rainham from April 1943. On 7 September 1945, the No. 28 EFTS absorbed the No. 20 Service Flying Training School at RAF Cranborne. On 30 October 1945, after the need for RAF pilots diminished, the No. 28 EFTS was disbanded and RAF Mount Hampden was closed.

=== Post-war ===
After World War II, RAF Mount Hampden was closed in 1948 according to other sources. In 1957, the Moshanaland Flying Club (MFC) relocated to Mount Hampden Airport following approval from the Department of Civil Aviation. Previously, it was based at Marlborough Airport. The airport was as a training airfield and began sporadic aviation operations. It remained unmanned until December 1957, when Charles Hilton Prince became Air Traffic Controller and Airport Manager of the airport. Afterwards, it became an airport for general aviation aircraft, while also alleviating passenger traffic from Salisbury Airport.

On 18 February 1973, Charles Hilton Prince passed away. Two days later, he was cremated at the Warren Hills Crematorium, and a formation of three light aircraft piloted by his former pupils was flown. In his life, Prince had logged more than 14,000 hours of flight time, becoming an Air Force Cross recipient during his career. In late 1974, Afro-Continental Airways flew its last flight to Mount Hampden Airport from Salisbury Airport. The aircraft was a Lockheed Constellation, which was the only operating plane in the airline's fleet. Afterwards, it was turned into the clubhouse. On 22 June 1978, Mount Hampden Airport was renamed to Charles Prince Airport in his honour. Only one original building from the wartime era exists today, and the U-shaped entrance road is still partially used.

== Operations ==
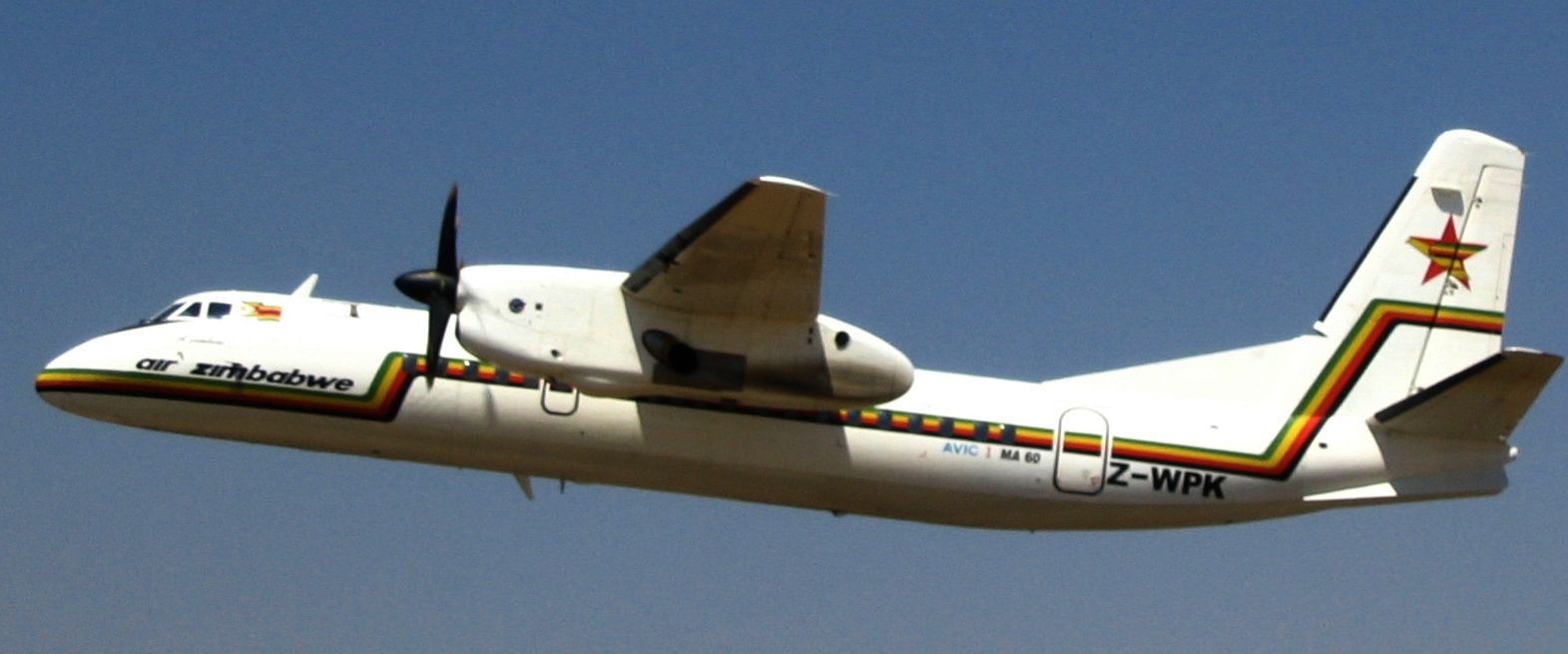
Air Zimbabwe MA60 (Z-WPK) at Mount Hampden Junction, Zimbabwe, taken on 10 September 2005.

Today, Charles Prince Airport is owned and operated by Airports Company of Zimbabwe (Pvt) Ltd. Currently, Charles Prince Airport is home to a number of aviation training schools and aircraft maintenance facilities.

In 1995, Guthrie Aviation was established in Charles Prince Airport by Craig Guthrie as a private flight training and aviation services school. It is registered by the Zimbabwe Ministry of Higher Education and Civil Aviation Authority of Zimbabwe, and currently operates as of 2026.

Falcon Air Ltd. was established around the 2000s as a section of the District Development Fund. It is composed of the flight operations department and administration department, and is currently based at the airport. The company provides charter airline and flight operations enterprise using light aircraft such as the Cessna 182, 207, and F406.

== Facilities ==
Charles Prince Airport currently operates two runways, one designated 06/24 measuring 1,200 metres long and 17 metres wide, and another designated 14/32 measuring 925 metres long and 18 metres wide. Both runways are accompanied by parallel taxiways. Only aircraft under 5,700 kg could operate from the airport, and there are two aprons with space for up to 25 light aircraft. The Harare-Charles Prince non-directional beacon (Ident: CP) is located on the field.

== See also ==
- Transport in Zimbabwe
- List of airports in Zimbabwe
