= Avient Aviation =

International cargo airline

IATA	ICAO	Call sign
Z3	SMJ	AV AVIA
- Founded: 1993
- Ceased operations: 2013
- Hubs: Liège Airport; Sharjah International Airport
- Fleet size: 4
- Destinations: 12 (scheduled)
- Headquarters: Harare, Zimbabwe
- Key people: Simon Clarke (chief operating officer); Andrew Smith (chief executive officer)

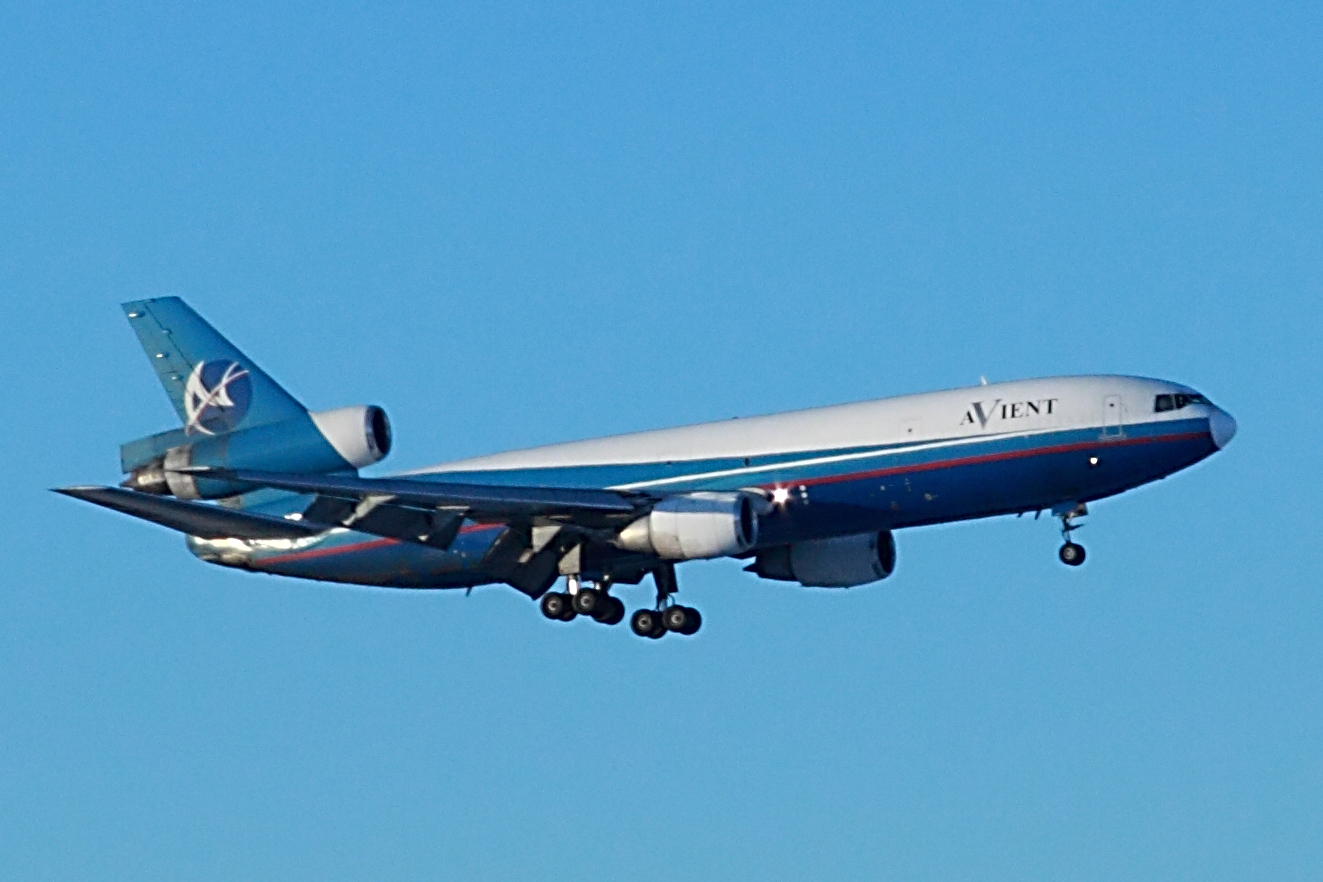
An Avient McDonnell Douglas DC-10-30CF approaching Oslo Airport, Gardermoen (2009).

Avient Aviation was an international cargo airline with its head office in Harare, Zimbabwe and its commercial center in the United Kingdom. The company was established in 1993 and offered scheduled and chartered flights to Africa, South America, Middle East and Far East and the Caspian region. Avient Limited was placed into administration on 5 April 2013, with flight operations taken over by AV Cargo Airlines Limited.

== Corporate affairs ==
The company Avient Aviation had its head office in Harare, Zimbabwe. It had its Continental Europe office on the property of Liège Airport in Grâce-Hollogne, Belgium. It had its United Kingdom office in Global House, Manor Court in Manor Royal, Crawley, West Sussex RH10 9PY. Andrew Smith founded Avient's UK sales office in the United Kingdom office in 2001.

== Fleet ==
In 2009, Avient took delivery of an MD-11F

Avient originally planned to replace its DC-10s with A330s, however the company decided that the MD-11F was the more appropriate substitute.

== Accidents and incidents ==
On 28 November 2009, an Avient Aviation McDonnell Douglas MD-11F crashed during its take-off roll at Shanghai Pudong International Airport, resulting in the death of three people on board and the aircraft being written off.
